= List of video games developed in the Netherlands =

This is a list of released and upcoming video games that are developed in the Netherlands. The list is sorted by game title, platform, year of release and their developer. This list does not include serious games.

Title	Platform	Year	Developer
In den Beginne	Commodore 64	1984	Radarsoft
Steen der Wijzen	Commodore 64	1984	Radarsoft
Tijdreiziger	Commodore 64	1984	Radarsoft
Space Mates	Commodore 64	1984	Radarsoft
Snoopy	Commodore 64	1984	Radarsoft
De Sekte	Commodore 64	1985	Radarsoft
Eindeloos (aka Endless)	Commodore 64	1985	Radarsoft
Dr.J	Commodore 64	1985	Radarsoft
Hollandtis	Commodore 64	1985	Radarsoft
De Grotten van Oberon	Commodore 64	1985	Radarsoft
Oh Shit! (aka Oh No!)	MSX	1985	Aackosoft
Boom!	MSX	1985	Aackosoft
North Sea Helicopter	MSX	1985	Aackosoft
Ultra Chess	MSX	1985	Aackosoft
Jet Bomber	MSX	1985	Aackosoft
Fraxxon	Philips P2000	1986	LBK Production
Hopper	MSX	1986	Eaglesoft
Hopeloos (aka Hopeless)	Commodore 64	1986	Radarsoft
Balletje Balletje	Commodore 64	1986	Radarsoft
Revolverheld	Commodore 64	1986	Radarsoft
Noach 3000	Commodore 64	1986	Radarsoft
Topless	Commodore 64	1986	Radarsoft
Sprinter (aka The Train Game)	MSX	1986	The ByteBusters
Smack Wacker (aka Mr. Jaws)	MSX	1986	The ByteBusters
Balletje De Luxe	Commodore 64	1987	Radarsoft
Zone 7 part II	Commodore 64	1987	Radarsoft
Bouncer	Amiga	1987	Thijs van Rijswijk, Reinier van Vliet
Iceball	Amiga	1988	Thijs van Rijswijk, Reinier van Vliet
Ball Raider II	Amiga	1988	Thijs van Rijswijk, Reinier van Vliet
Skooter	MSX	1988	The ByteBusters
Horror Hotel	MS-DOS	1988	Radarsoft
Hawkeye	Amiga, Atari ST, Commodore 64	1988	Boys without Brains
Venom Wing	Amiga	1990	Soft Eyes / Team Hoi
Flimbo's Quest	Amiga, Commodore 64	1990	Euphoria
Lost in Amsterdam	MS-DOS	1992	Radarsoft
Tangram	CD-i	1992	EagleVision Interactive
Hoi	Amiga	1992	Team Hoi
Borobodur: The Planet Of Doom	Amiga	1992	Soft Eyes / Team Hoi
Cognition	Amiga	1993	Team Hoi
Steel Machine	CD-i	1993	The Vision Factory
Alien Gate	CD-i	1993	The Vision Factory
Disposable Hero	Amiga	1993	Euphoria
Eggbert in Eggciting Adventure	MSX	1994	Fony
Clockwiser	MS-DOS, Amiga, Amiga CD32, Android (2010), iOS (2014)	1994	Team Hoi
Lingo	CD-i	1994	The Vision Factory
Christmas Crisis	CD-i	1994	DIMA
Dimo's Quest	CD-i	1994	The Vision Factory
Jazz Jackrabbit	MS-DOS	1994	Arjan Brussee/Orange Games
The Apprentice	CD-i	1994	The Vision Factory
Coala	Amiga	1995	Bitfusion
Dream Prisoner	MS-DOS	1995	Procurion 9
Yogho! Yogho!	MS-DOS	1995	Euphoria
Family Games	CD-i	1995	DIMA
Family Games II: Junk Food Jive	CD-i	1995	DIMA
Christmas Country	CD-i	1995	Alex van Oostenrijk, Alex Lentjes
Super Worms	MS-DOS	1995	Wiering Software
Uncover featuring Tatjana	CD-i, Windows	1996	The Vision Factory
Lucky Luke: The Video Game	CD-i	1996	The Vision Factory
Charlie the Duck	MS-DOS	1996	Wiering Software
De Zaak van Sam	CD-i	1997	NOB Interactive, HUB
Moon Child	Windows, iOS (2012), macOS (2018)	1997	Team Hoi
A2 Racer	Windows	1997	Davilex Games
Red Cat-series	Windows	1997	Davilex Games
Tetsuo Gaiden	CD-i	1997	Creative Multimedia/DIMA
Whack-a-Bubble	CD-i	1997	Creative Multimedia/DIMA
Accelerator	CD-i	1997	The Vision Factory
Golden Oldies I: Guardian & Invaders	CD-i	1997	The Vision Factory
Golden Oldies II: Blockbuster & Bughunt	CD-i	1997	The Vision Factory
Zenith	CD-i	1997	Radarsoft
Masters of the Elements (aka Meesters van Macht)	Windows	1997	IJsfontein
Brand Slakkenrace	Windows	1998	Team Hoi / Jaytown
Sint Nicolaas	MS-DOS	1998	Wiering Software
The Lost Ride	CD-i	1998	Lost Boys Games
A2 Racer II	Windows	1998	Davilex Games
Dodgem Arena	PlayStation	1998	Lost Boys Games
WK '98 Voetbal Avontuur	Windows	1998	Davilex Games
Age of Wonders	Windows	1999	Triumph Studios
Jazz Jackrabbit 2	Windows	1999	Orange Games
London Racer	PlayStation	1999	Davilex Games
Moorhuhn	Windows	1999	Witan Entertainment
Amsterdoom	Windows	2000	Davilex Games
Rhino Rumble	Game Boy Color	2000	Lost Boys Games
Big Brother The Game	Windows	2000	Lost Boys Games
Hooligans: Storm Over Europe	Windows	2000	DarXabre
A2 Racer III Europa Tour	Windows	2000	Davilex Games
Vakantie Racer	Windows	2000	Davilex Games
Toki Tori	Game Boy Color	2001	Two Tribes
Worms World Party	Game Boy Advance	2001	Two Tribes
Tiny Toon Adventures: Dizzy's Candy Quest	Game Boy Color	2001	Lost Boys Games
Keep the Balance	Game Boy Color	2001	Karma Studios
Europe Racer	Windows	2001	Davilex Games
A2 Racer IV The Cop's Revenge	Windows	2001	Davilex Games
Euro-Man	Windows	2001	Engine Software
Charlie II	Windows	2002	Wiering Software
Age of Wonders II: The Wizard's Throne	Windows	2002	Triumph Studios
Invader	Game Boy Advance	2002	Lost Boys Games
Black Belt Challenge	Game Boy Advance	2002	Lost Boys Games
Suske & Wiske De Tijdtemmers	Game Boy Color	2002	Witan Entertainment
Knight Rider: The Game	Windows, PlayStation 2	2002	Davilex Games
Rocky	Game Boy Advance	2002	
Miniconomy	Windows	2002	Trade Games International
Yin Hung	Symbian	2003	Team Hoi / Overloaded
Age of Wonders: Shadow Magic	Windows	2003	Triumph Studios
Beach King stunt Racer	Windows, PlayStation 2	2003	Davilex Games
Coronel Indoor Kartracing	Windows	2003	Engine Software
Fantom Overdrive	Symbian	2003	Overloaded
Olaf & Elmar in the Castles of Nabokos	Windows	2004	Wiering Software
Knight Rider 2: The Game	PlayStation 2, Windows	2004	Davilex Games
Killzone	PlayStation 2	2004	Guerrilla Games
Alpha Black Zero Intrepid Protocol	Windows	2004	Khaeon
Cyclone Circus	PlayStation 2	2004	Playlogic Entertainment
Shellshock: Nam '67	Windows, PlayStation 2, Xbox	2004	Guerrilla Games
Wade Hixton's Counter Punch	Game Boy Advance	2004	Engine Software
ATV Mud Racer	Windows	2005	Team6 Game Studios
London Racer Destruction/Police Madness	Windows, PlayStation 2	2005	Davilex Games
Pizza Dude	Windows	2005	Team6 Game Studios
Summer games	Mobile game	2005	
EuroCops	Windows	2005	CrazyFoot Gamestudio
Kruistocht in Spijkerbroek	Windows	2006	Submarine
Ship simulator	Windows	2006	VSTEP
Bonk's Return	Mobile Phone	2006	Two Tribes
Xyanide	Xbox	2006	Playlogic Entertainment
Killzone Liberation	PlayStation Portable	2006	Guerrilla Games
Garfield: A Tail of Two Kitties	Windows, PlayStation 2, Nintendo DS	2006	Two Tribes
Delicious	Windows	2006	Zylom Studios
Fate by Numbers	Windows	2007	Revival
Overlord	Windows, Xbox 360	2007	Triumph Studios
My Horse and Me	Windows, Wii	2007	W!Games
Delicious 2	Windows	2007	Zylom Studios
Puzzle Quest: Challenge of the Warlords	Nintendo DS	2007	Engine Software
Stateshift	PlayStation Portable	2007	Engine Software
Xyanide Resurrection	PlayStation Portable	2007	Playlogic Entertainment
Worms: Open Warfare 2	Nintendo DS	2007	Two Tribes
Iron Grip: Warlord	Windows	2008	ISOTX
Efteling Tycoon	Windows	2008	Dartmoor Softworks, HexArts Entertainment
Dragon Hunters	Nintendo DS	2008	Engine Software
Circular Assault	iPhone	2008	NotTheFly
The Chronicles of Spellborn	Windows	2008	Spellborn International
Rubik's Puzzle World	Wii	2008	Two Tribes
Toki Tori	WiiWare	2008	Two Tribes
Bang Attack	WiiWare	2008	Engine Software
GoPets: Vacation Island	Nintendo DS	2008	Engine Software
Overlord: Raising Hell	Windows, Xbox 360, PlayStation 3	2008	Triumph Studios
Delicious: Emily's Tea Garden	Windows	2008	Zylom Studios
de Blob	Wii	2008	concept by Utrecht School of the Arts
Star Defense	iPhone	2008	Rough Cookie
Iron Grip: Lords of War	Windows	2009	ISOTX
Adam's Venture	Windows, PlayStation 3	2009	Vertigo Games
Killzone 2	PlayStation 3	2009	Guerrilla Games
Pluk van de Petteflet	Nintendo DS	2009	Triangle Studios
Sunshine Beach Volleyball	Windows	2009	
Snakeworlds	Windows	2009	Patrick Kooman
Mega Mindy	Nintendo DS	2009	thePharmacy
Rush Rush Rally Racing	Dreamcast, WiiWare	2009	Senile Team
Heron: Steam Machine	WiiWare, iOS	2009	Triangle Studios
Delicious: Emily's Taste of Fame	Windows	2009	Zylom Studios
Swords & Soldiers	WiiWare	2009	Ronimo Games
Overlord II	Windows, Xbox 360, PlayStation 3	2009	Triumph Studios
Sudoku Ball Detective	Windows, Nintendo DS, Wii	2009	Whitebear, Playlogic Entertainment
Rocket Riot	Xbox Live Arcade	2009	Codeglue
Campfire Legends - The Hookman	Windows	2009	Zylom Studios
Fairytale Fights	Microsoft Windows, PlayStation 3, Xbox 360	2009	Playlogic Entertainment
Quest Braintainment	Nintendo DS	2010	thePharmacy
Het Huis Anubis - De donkere Strijd	Nintendo DS	2010	thePharmacy, Engine Software
CatSpin	iOS	2010	Phure Studios
Chefs Attack	iOS	2010	Phure Studios
Jimmy Pataya	iOS, Android	2010	Paladin Studios
Pulse: The Game	iOS	2010	Virtual Fairground, Rough Cookie
Greed Corp	PlayStation Network, Xbox Live Arcade, Steam	2010	W!Games
Club Galactik	Online game	2010	Virtual Fairground
HoopWorld BasketBrawl	Wii, WiiWare	2010	Streamline Studios, Virtual Toys
Super Crate Box	Steam, iOS	2010	Vlambeer
Iron Grip: Marauders	Windows	2011	ISOTX
Serious Sam: The Random Encounter	Windows	2011	Vlambeer
Nuclear Dawn	Windows, Mac OS X	2011	InterWave Studios
Proun	Windows	2011	Joost van Dongen
K3 en de Vrolijke Noten	Nintendo DS	2011	thePharmacy, Engine Software
Banana Banzai	iOS	2011	DarXabre
Killzone 3	PlayStation 3	2011	Guerrilla Games
Swap This!	iOS	2011	Two Tribes
Gatling Gears	PlayStation Network, Xbox Live Arcade, Steam	2011	Vanguard Games
Monster Tracker	Android, iOS	2011	Rough Cookie
Sticky	iOS	2011	Gamistry
Fingle	iPad	2012	Game Oven
Kids vs Goblins	iOS	2012	Stolen Couch Games
EnerCities	Facebook, Online game	2012	Paladin Studios
DancePad	iOS	2012	Triangle Studios
Final Run	iOS	2012	Rotor Games
Snake '97	iOS, Android, Windows Phone	2012	Willem L. Middelkoop
Snake 2k	iOS, Android, Windows Phone	2012	Willem L. Middelkoop
Munch Time	iOS, Android	2012	Gamistry
Scrap Tank	iOS, Android	2012	Gamistry
Awesomenauts	PlayStation Network, Xbox Live Arcade, Steam	2012	Ronimo Games
Cargo Commander	Windows, Mac OS X, Linux	2012	Serious Brew
Aviation Empire	iOS, Android	2013	KLM
EDGE	Wii U eShop, Steam, Nintendo 3DS	2013	Two Tribes
Momonga Pinball Adventures	iOS, Android	2013	Paladin Studios
Ridiculous Fishing	iOS	2013	Vlambeer
Terraria	Xbox Live Arcade, PlayStation 3 (PSN), PlayStation Vita (PSN)	2013	Engine Software
Toki Tori 2	Wii U eShop, Steam	2013	Two Tribes
Reus	Windows	2013	Abbey Games
Halo: Spartan Assault	Windows 8, Windows Phone 8, Xbox 360, Xbox One	2013	Vanguard Games
ibb & obb	PlayStation 3 (PSN)	2013	Sparpweed
SpongeBob SquarePants: Plankton's Robotic Revenge	Nintendo DS	2013	Engine Software
Killzone: Shadow Fall	PlayStation 4	2013	Guerrilla Games
Gold Diggers	iOS, Android	2013	Gamistry
Luftrausers	Windows, Mac OS X, Linux, PlayStation 3 (PSN), PlayStation Vita (PSN)	2014	Vlambeer
Age of Wonders III	Windows	2014	Triumph Studios
Bounden	iOS, Android	2014	Game Oven, Dutch National Ballet
Metrico	PlayStation Vita (PSN)	2014	Digital Dreams
Sumico	iOS, Android	2014	Ludomotion
Lethal League	Steam	2014	Reptile Games
Halo: Spartan Strike	Steam, Windows, Windows Phone	2014	Vanguard Games
Proun+	Wii U eShop, iOS	2014	Engine Software
Sword & Soldiers II	Wii U eShop	2014	Ronimo Games
Lumini	Windows	2015	Speelbaars
RIVE	Wii U eShop, Steam, PlayStation 4 (PSN), Xbox One (XBLA)	2015	Two Tribes
Verdun	Steam, Xbox One, PlayStation 4	2015	M2H and Blackmill Games
Nuclear Throne	Windows, PlayStation 4 (PSN), PlayStation Vita (PSN), Xbox One (XBLA)	2015	Vlambeer
FRU	Xbox One	2015	Through Games
Cross of the Dutchman	Xbox Live Arcade, Windows, PlayStation 3 (PSN)	2015	Triangle Studios
Renowned Explorers	Windows, MacOS, Linux	2015	Abbey Games
Rusty Lake: Hotel	PC, Google Play, iOS	2015, 2016	Rusty Lake
SpeedRunners	Windows, Steam	2016	DoubleDutch Games
Arizona Sunshine	HTC Vive, Steam, PlayStation VR	2016	Vertigo Games
Tricky Towers	HTC Vive, Steam, Xbox One, PlayStation 4, Nintendo Switch	2016	WeirdBeard
Rusty Lake: Roots	PC, Google Play, iOS	2016	Rusty Lake
Monster Jam: Crush It!	Xbox One, PlayStation 4, Nintendo Switch	2016, 2017	Team6 Game Studios
Horizon Zero Dawn	PlayStation 4	2017	Guerrilla Games
Herald: An Interactive Period Drama	Steam	2017	Wispfire
We Were Here	Steam, Xbox One	2017	Total Mayhem Games
VR Darts	Steam	2018	Hypersome Games
We Were Here Too	Steam, Xbox One	2018	Total Mayhem Games
Rusty Lake Paradise	PC, Google Play, iOS	2018	Rusty Lake
Cube Escape: Paradox	PC, Google Play, iOS	2018	Rusty Lake
Nairi: Tower of Shirin	Steam, Nintendo Switch	2018	HomeBearStudio
Audio Infection	Steam	2018	RaafOritme
We Were Here Together	Steam, Xbox One	2019	Total Mayhem Games
Tannenberg	Steam, Xbox One, PlayStation 4	2019	M2H and Blackmill Games
Age of Wonders: Planetfall	Windows, Xbox One, PlayStation 4	2019	Triumph Studios
Street Outlaws: The List	PlayStation 4, Xbox One, Nintendo Switch, Windows	2019	Team6 Game Studios
Gravinoid	Steam	2020	Hypersome Games
Good Job!	Nintendo Switch	2020	Paladin Studios
The White Door	PC, Google Play, iOS	2020	Rusty Lake
Samsara Room	PC, Google Play, iOS	2020	Rusty Lake
Cube Escape Collection	PC, Google Play, iOS	2020	Rusty Lake
Godhood	Windows	2020	Abbey Games
Scott Pilgrim vs. the World: The Game – Complete Edition	PlayStation 4, Xbox One, Nintendo Switch, Windows, Stadia	2021	Engine Software
Taxi Chaos	PlayStation 4, Xbox One, Nintendo Switch	2021	Team6 Game Studios
Street Outlaws 2: Winner Takes All	PlayStation 4, PlayStation 5, Xbox One, Xbox Series X/S, Nintendo Switch, Windows	2021	Team6 Game Studios
Milo and the Magpies	PC, Google Play, iOS	2021	Johan Scherft
Zeepkist	Steam	2021	Steelpan Interactive
Horizon Forbidden West	PlayStation 4, PlayStation 5	2022	Guerrilla Games
RTX Sweeper	Steam	2022	RaafOritme
Cat Cafe Manager	Nintendo Switch, Steam	2022	Roost Games
Winkeltje: The Little Shop	Nintendo Switch, Steam	2022	Sassybot
The Past Within	PC, Google Play, iOS	2022	Rusty Lake
Bloody Hell	Steam	2023	Pun Intended
Station to Station	Steam	2023	Galaxy Grove
Condo	Nintendo Switch, Steam	2025	FlubbedMachina
Town to City	Steam	2025	Galaxy Grove
Faire Trade	Steam	2025	Sassybot
Dobbel Dungeon	Steam	2026	Gamepie
