= Video games in the Netherlands =

The Netherlands' mainstream video games market, not taking into consideration the serious and casual games, is the sixth largest in Europe. In 2008, the Dutch market took up 3.95% of the entire European market in total sales and 4.19% in software sales.

A significant part of the Netherlands' gaming industry is in serious games, in which Dutch companies make a significant part of the worldwide industry.

In the Netherlands, an estimated 4,000 people are working in the games industry, at more than 600 companies. Over 45 of the companies are located in the Dutch Game Garden, a government subsidized organization with the aim of promoting and improving the video games industry in the Netherlands.

== Consumer availability ==
In 2007, the Dutch game industry surpassed the Dutch film industry for the first time in history. The growth of the games industry in the Netherlands is about 50% higher than any other industry in the Netherlands' region.

Despite the 2008 financial crisis, the situation of video gaming in the Netherlands is not all that bad. Both publishers and retailers report that the crisis has certainly not caused a drop in sales, while at times, sales have even improved.

=== History ===
Although the first generation of video games were obtained by a select few, video games became first available during the second generation of video games, when a select few Dutch electronic stores carried the earlier systems. With the third generation, more stores started carrying video game related products, a trend that has been setting through ever since.

In the early '90s, independent video game stores first started to open in the Netherlands, with a fast expansion in the early 2000s. Since 2004, video games have gotten more important for general stores however, which has led to the closing of a number of game stores, and a merger of others.

Currently, there are about 1,200 stores, of which about 75 independent, in the Netherlands that carry video games and related items, and numerous online stores.

=== Distribution ===
Distribution of games on physical media in the Netherlands is usually done by publishers or major distributors such as Micromedia BV in Nijmegen that cover the entire Benelux, although most of the publishers' offices are located in the Netherlands, and only a few have offices in Belgium. Since not every publisher has a separate office for the Benelux, certain publishers take care of multiple labels, including those of other publishers.

The Netherlands also has several publishers for games through digital distribution, such as via web portals and mobile platforms like the App Store and Google Play.

== Netherlands in video games ==
The Netherlands is not often used as a setting for video games, other than certain Dutch games such as A2 Racer, AmsterDoom (NL wiki) and Efteling Tycoon. Amsterdam, the capital of the Netherlands, was planned to be a featured city in The Getaway 3, before its development was cancelled. The first internationally successful game to use the Netherlands as a setting is Hitman: Codename 47, which has a level set in Rotterdam. Resistance: Retribution also featured a level in Rotterdam. During World War II, the Netherlands was the location of Operation Market Garden, a much-used setting for World War II games. The game Brothers in Arms: Hell's Highway focusses entirely on Operation Market Garden and accurately depicts the Dutch towns and landscape along the operation's route.

In games such as the FIFA football games and Olympic video games, teams or players from the Netherlands are featured. The TT Circuit Assen is by fans considered "The Cathedral" of motorcycling, with the Dutch TT being one of the biggest events in motorbike racing. As such, the track is featured in many of the motorcycling racing games. Circuit Park Zandvoort is a Formula One racing track. The track has been featured in its old Formula One-layout in the game Grand Prix Legends, and more recently in its current layout in TOCA Race Driver, TOCA Race Driver 2, Race 07 and rFactor 2.

Recently Mario Kart Tour added an Amsterdam tour track to its roster.

== Video game development ==
=== Game developers from the Netherlands ===
Company	Location	Founded	Type
Engine Software	Doetinchem	1991	entertainment, handheld, mobile games. Co-dev, porting.
Witan Entertainment	Haarlem	1992	entertainment, casual, serious, mobile games
MAD Multimedia	Groningen	1996	serious games
Elements Interactive	Almere	1996	mobile games, software and websites
IJsfontein	Amsterdam	1997	serious games
Triumph Studios	Delft	1997	core games
GamePoint B.V.	The Hague	1998	online casino games
Khaeon	The Hague	1999	core games
Nixxes Software	Utrecht	1999	video game conversions and software
RANJ	Rotterdam	1999	serious games
Behaviour Rotterdam	Rotterdam	2000	core games, co-dev, porting. Ex-Codeglue (2000–2023).
Bright Alley	Utrecht	2000	serious games and gamification
E-Semble bv	Delft	2000	serious games
Guerrilla Games	Amsterdam	2000	core games
NotTheFly Mobile Entertainment	Venlo	2000	mobile games
Little Chicken Game Company B.V.	Amsterdam	2001	core & mobile games
Monkeybizniz	Utrecht	2001	serious games
Grendel Games	Leeuwarden	2002	core- and serious games
Pixel Pixies	Leeuwarden	2002	serious games
Trade Games International	The Hague	2002	core games
VSTEP	Rotterdam	2002	serious games
Eximion	Eindhoven	2003	core- and casual games, game distributor
Team6 Game Studios	Assen	2003	core games
CrazyFoot Gamestudio	The Hague	2004	core games
Gamebasics Studio	Zoetermeer	2004	mobile games
Mindgame	Amsterdam	2004	serious games
Spill Group	Utrecht	2004	casual games (since 2008 known as Spil Games)
Xform	Utrecht	2004	browser based 3D games
Paladin Studios	The Hague	2005	mobile games
Soepel	Amsterdam	2005	casual and serious games
Sticky Studios	Utrecht	2005	serious and mobile games
Triangle Studios	Leeuwarden	2005	core and mobile games
Tygron	The Hague	2005	serious games
Virtual Racing Industries B.V.	Heemstede	2005	real-life RC events, serious games
BlewScreen	Tilburg	2006	casual and serious games
Coin-Op Interactive	Rotterdam	2006	video game design
Blender Institute	Amsterdam	2007	Open content
FourceLabs	Utrecht	2007	serious games
Weber Sites & Games BV	Arnhem	2007	casual, mobile games
ZC Funcraft	Nijmegen	2007	core games
Flavour	Amsterdam	2008	serious games
OneBigGame	Amsterdam	2008	core and casual games
Play like a Champion	Amsterdam	2008	sports games (since 2017 known as Socios Sports)
Rough Cookie	Amsterdam	2008	mobile and handheld games
WeirdBeard	Amsterdam	2008	web games
M2H	Alkmaar	2009	mobile, casual and core games
DoubleDutch Games	Utrecht	2010	indie games
GamoVation	Zwolle	2010	mobile and casual games
Rumble Spark Games	Zwolle	2010	mobile games. Ex-Gazingy Interactive till 2023.
Rising Step	IJsselstein	2010	core games
Stolen Couch Games	Utrecht	2010	core games
Virtual Play	Utrecht	2010	mobile, core and serious games
Game Oven	Utrecht	2011	mobile, experimental games
Jaywalkers Interactive	Randstad	2011	core and VR games
Jolly Jellyfish	Groningen	2011	promotional games
Ludomotion	Amsterdam	2011	indie games
RageSquid	Utrecht (HQ); Tilburg	2011	core games
Team Reptile	Hilversum	2011	core games
8D Games	Leeuwarden	2012	serious games
Black Cube Games	Amstelveen	2012	core games
Blue Giraffe	Eindhoven	2012	casual, mobile games
Critical Bit	Leeuwarden	2012	core and serious games
Jagaco Games	Zoetermeer	2012	casual, mobile games
Mimicry Games	Leusden	2012	core and casual games, software
Modoka Studios Entertainment	Zwolle	2012	mobile and casual games
Sparkling Society	Delft	2012	casual, mobile games
Trigames	Delft	2012	casual, mobile games
Wispfire	Utrecht	2012	casual and serious games
2Monkeys	Deventer	2013	casual, puzzle, mobile games
BitBunch	Rotterdam	2013	Simulation and Game-engine Technology
Digital Design Games	Groningen	2013	serious games and indie games
BlackMill Games	Heiloo	2013	core games
Dutch Game Studio	Woerden	2013	mobile games
KeokeN Interactive	Hoofddorp	2013	core games
Kings Lane	Amsterdam	2013	casual, mobile games
Maata Games	Arnhem	2013	browser games, mobile games
Studio Bleep	Groningen	2013	serious games, augmented reality
Twirlbound	Breda	2013	core games
Vanilla	Eindhoven	2013	mobile games
ChimpWorks	Eindhoven	2014	mobile games
Knuist & Perzik	Veenendaal	2014	core games
Codeer Studio	Netherlands	2015	indie games
Dual Cortex Gaming	Amsterdam	2015	mobile games
Force Field	Amsterdam	2015	core and casual games
Hulan Studio	Eindhoven	2015	serious games
Rusty Lake	Amsterdam	2015	indie games
Stitch Heads Entertainment	Breda	2015	core games
TurtleBlaze	The Hague	2015	core and casual games
Studio 397	Apeldoorn	2016	racing sims
TRAGsoft	Zevenaar	2016	core games
Grumpy Owl Games	Utrecht	2017	core games, board game adaptations, & edutainment
Hypersome Games	Den Bosch	2017	VR games
Wooden Shoes Games	Rotterdam	2017	casual games
Yellowcake Games	Utrecht	2017	core games
BadDice	Heerlen	2018	casual games
Blast Zero	Rotterdam	2018	Ex-Tanuki Creative Studio (2018–2023). Ex-publisher.
Mystery City Games BV	Amsterdam	2018	outdoor events, online team-builders, core games
Twin Wasp Sims	Amersfoort	2018	Serious games, simulation, 3rd party
Undreamed Games	Amsterdam	2018	indie games
Beyond All Reason team	Netherlands	2019	core games, open-source
Game Tailors	Delft	2019	serious games, gamification
Kami Games	Apeldoorn	2019	indie games
Kessels game studio	Beesel	2019	small indie games
Sparrow Night	Rotterdam	2019	core games. Ex-Studio Nul Games.
Bonte Avond	Utrecht	2020	indie games
Eerie Guest Studios	Hilversum	2020	core games
Roost Games	Utrecht	2020	indie games
Thunderoak Interactive	Rijswijk	2021	core games
Mystic ERA games	Harderwijk	2022	indie games
OnRush Studio	Amsterdam	2022	core games
Snail Bite	Amsterdam	2022	core games
Square Glade Games	Groningen	2022	core games
Enchanted Works	Utrecht	2022	Indie Games
Studio Mantasaur	Utrecht	2022	Indie Games
Konafa Games B.V.	Amsterdam	2023	indie games
Rangatang	Utrecht	2023	Indie games. Founded by ex-Ronimo Games staff.
Hilkojj Interactive	Amersfoort	2024	Simulation & core games

=== Defunct game developers ===
Company	Founded	Ended	Type	Reason for ending development
Courbois Software	1982	2012	core & casual games	dissolved
The Bytebusters	1983	1988	core & casual games	filed for bankruptcy in 1988
Radarsoft	1984	1987	core & casual games	Radarsoft continues without gaming products
Team Hoi	1988	1998	core & casual games	dissolved. Ex-"SoftEyes" / "Softeyes Design" (1990–1994).
ANMA	1989	1993	core & casual games	dissolved
Parallax	1989	2000	core & casual games	dissolved
Ultra Force	1989	1993		moved to computer software development
The Vision Factory	1992	2002	casual games	filed for bankruptcy in January 2002
Digital Infinity	1995	2000	casual games	merged into Lost Boys Games
DIMA/Creative Media	1995	1997		dissolved
Orange Games	1995	2000	core, casual and mobile games	merged into Lost Boys Games
White Bear	1998	2011		filed for bankruptcy in December 2011
Lost Boys Games	2000	2003	core & casual games	taken over and renamed Guerrilla Games
DarXabre	2001	2011		inactive since 2011
Streamline Studios	2001	2009		filed for bankruptcy in November 2009
Playlogic Entertainment	2002	2010	core games	filed for bankruptcy in July 2010 and again in December 2014
Coded Illusions	2004	2008		filed for bankruptcy September 2008
Spellborn Works	2004	2009		filed for bankruptcy in June 2009
W!Games	2005	2016	core & casual games	merged as Vanguard Games into Force Field in April 2016
Ronimo Games	2007	2023	core games	filed for bankruptcy in August 2023
Virtual Fairground	2008	2011		filed for bankruptcy in April 2011
Vlambeer	2010	2020		dissolved
Ostrich Banditos	2012	2015	core games	dissolved/abandoned in 2015
Through Games	2014	2017	core game	likely inactive in Jan 2017 as co-founder became independent contractor
Wolfdog Interactive	2014	2023	VR games	closed
Tanuki Creative Studio	2018	2023		merged into Blast Zero

=== Game publishers from the Netherlands ===
Company	Location	Founded	Type
Abstraction Games B.V.	Valkenswaard (HQ)	2007	Publisher, co-development, porting. Former dev.
Artificial Core	Amsterdam (HQ), Kyiv (Development)	2015	Publisher & dev - online games
DarkPhobia Games	Netherlands	2023	Publisher & dev - horror games
Big Fan Games	The Hague	2024	Publishing label of Devolver Digital.
Dutch Game Studio	Woerden	2013	Mobile Games
Evil Turtle Productions	Losser	2015	Publisher & dev - audio, indie games
Feel Free Games B.V.	Sassenheim	2021	Publisher & dev - casual games
Finitude	Maastricht (HQ), Berlin (Development)	2015	Publisher & dev - core games
Firenut Games	Breda	2018	Publisher & dev - core games
Future Minimalism	Alkmaar	2021	Publisher & dev - core games
GameHouse B.V.	Eindhoven	2001	Casual games distributor & dev. Ex-Zylom Media Group BV (2001–2008), RealGames B.V. (2008–2010).
Gamious	Haarlem	2011	casual games on multiple platforms
Good Shepherd Entertainment	The Hague	2011	console and PC games
Iceberg Interactive	Haarlem	2009	core and casual games
Kakao Games Europe B.V.	Amstelveen	2015	online games. Global arm of Kakao Games.
Knights Peak Interactive	Amsterdam	2024	core publishing label of My.Games
Level Infinite	Amsterdam (HQ), Singapore	2021	core and mobile games
Lion Castle Entertainment	Assen	2018	core and casual games
Mind Control Games	Hilversum	2024	Publisher & dev - core games
Mindscape B.V.	Amstelveen	1991	Publisher, distributor & dev - core & casual games. Ex-Mindscape Northern Europe B.V. (1991–2016).
Mkay Productions	Amsterdam	2022	Publisher & dev - core games
Modoka Studios Entertainment	Zwolle	2012	mobile and casual games
noio games	Amsterdam (HQ)	2012	Publisher & dev - core games
OneBigGame	Amsterdam	2008	core and casual games
Orangepixel	Den Helder	2004	Publisher & dev - mobile & indie games
Perfect World Entertainment	Amsterdam	2011	console and PC games
PlayerUnknown Productions	Amsterdam	2021	Publisher & dev - open world games
Retrobright	Utrecht	2022	Publisher & dev - indie games, tute videos
Seven Volts Games	Tilburg	2020	Publisher & dev - core and casual games
Soedesco B.V.	Hoogvliet	2002	Publisher, distributor - core & casual games
Sokpop Collective	Utrecht	2015	Publisher & dev - casual games
Spill Group	Utrecht	2004	casual games (since 2008 known as Spil Games)
Studio Minus	Netherlands	2019	Publisher & dev - indie games
Studio Taghua	Amsterdam	2020	Publisher - core games
Tense Games	Breda	2008	Publisher & dev - core games
tinyBuild	Hilversum	2011	core games
The 4 Winds Entertainment	Amsterdam	2021	Publisher, marketing, localization - core games
Total Mayhem Games	Rotterdam	2016	Publisher & dev - indie games
UnitedGames	Wormerveer	2007	core games
Vertigo Games BV	Rotterdam	2008	Publisher & dev - core, VR & serious games
WeeCodeLab B.V.	The Hague (HQ)	2018	Publisher & dev - indie games

=== Defunct game publishers from the Netherlands ===
Company	Founded	Ended	Type	Reason for ending publishing
Aackosoft	1983	1988	publisher & dev: core & casual games	filed for bankruptcy in 1988
Davilex Games	1993	2005	casual and serious games	publisher & dev. Davilex continues w/o gaming products.
Easy Interactive B.V.	2001	2014	core games	filed for bankruptcy in 2014. Acquired by Dutch firm, Foreign Media Group, in 2006.
Fony	1989	1997	demos and puzzles	MSX dev & publisher. Ceased main work in 1997. Partially continued in Two Tribes.
Gambitious Digital Entertainment	2011	2017	console and PC games	Gambitious Digital Entertainment ceased crowdfunding activities. Rebranded into Good Shepherd Entertainment as publisher.
HD Publishing B.V.	1995	2008	core games	likely filed for bankruptcy in 2008. Ex-HD Interactive B.V. in 1995 to 2005.
Lighthouse Interactive	2005	2008	core games	closed due to bankruptcy of parent company in 2008.
Megaware Multimedia B.V.	2000	2005	core games	filed for bankruptcy in late 2005.
Midas Interactive Entertainment BV (ES wiki)	1998	2012	core games	HQ moved to UK in 2001 but Dutch office remained. Filed for bankruptcy in 2012.
Phoenix Games B.V.	2002	2010	budget games	Part of Dutch-UK firm, Phoenix Games Group. Filed 4 bankruptcy in Aug 2010.
Playlogic Entertainment	2002	2014	core games	filed for bankruptcy in Dec 2014.
Project Two Interactive BV	1995	2000	core games	filed for bankruptcy in 2000. Lead staff setup Project 3 Interactive in 2000.
Project Three Interactive BV	2000	2006	core games	filed for bankruptcy in early 2006. One co-founder setup Lighthouse Interactive in 2005; as CEO of Iceberg Interactive in 2009.
R&P Electronic Media	1991	2001	casual and serious games	publisher and localisation. Continued w/o gaming products.
Two Tribes	2000	2019	core and casual games	publisher & dev. Ceased game work in 2019.
Xing Interactive C.V.	2001	2009	core games	filed for bankruptcy, or reverted to parent holding group in early 2009.

=== Popular games developed in the Netherlands ===
- Adam's Venture
- Age of Wonders series
- Bang Attack
- Delicious series
- Horizon Zero Dawn series
- Ibb and Obb
- Killzone series
- Moorhuhn
- Overlord series
- Rocket Riot
- Ship Simulator
- Swords & Soldiers
- Tarimba & Taromba
- The Chronicles of Spellborn
- Toki Tori
- Worms: Open Warfare 2

=== Education ===
Up until 1998, whoever wanted to work in the gaming industry was best off pursuing a computer programming or graphic design education. In 1998, Utrecht School of the Arts offered the first 'pure' game education on the European continent. Currently there are 11 schools offering specific game educations in the Netherlands.

University of Amsterdam

Since 2013 the University of Amsterdam offers the first master program focused on game development (Game studies).

Utrecht University

Utrecht University offers Game technology as a variant of its Computer Science bachelor and a master in Game & Media Technology.

Breda University of Applied Sciences

Breda University of Applied Sciences has been offering a course in game development (Creative Media and Game Technologies), for over 10 years. The 4-year course is entirely focused on practical teaching, working with a variant of Project-Based Learning called "Role-Based Learning". Students work entirely on game development projects, with an assessment based on their behavior and learning within those projects. They also offer a Master in Game Technology.

Rotterdam University of Applied Sciences

Rotterdam University of Applied Sciences offer a major in Creative Media & Game Technologies with a minor Game design and Development for example where students have to create several games within a short amount of time. First, they learn to create a 2D Android game within 6 weeks. Then they learn to create a 3D game within 13 weeks total.

Saxion University of Applied Sciences

Saxion University of Applied Science in Enschede also offers a bachelor's degree in Creative Media and Game Technologies.

== Media ==
=== Print media ===
- Power Unlimited, since 1993 (oldest active publication)
- Control, since 2007

==== Defunct print media ====
- n3 Nintendo Magazine; 2002–2003
- GMR; 2006–2008
- gamesTM; 2008
- Hoog Spel; 1990–2002
- [N]Gamer; 2003–2012

=== Television and radio ===
- Gamekings, since 2002 (television)
- InsidegamerTV (television)

==== Defunct television and media ====
- GameVille (casual games television show)
- GameForce 1 (defunct television show, 1998–2000)
- GameQuest (defunct television show, 2000–2001)
- Gammo (defunct television show)
- Power Play (defunct television show)

=== Online media ===
- GamersNET.nl
- Insidegamer.nl
- Gamer.nl, since 1999 (oldest active online publication)
- Gamekings.tv
- Tweakers (games section)
- nl.IGN.com (Dutch)
- XGN (website)

==== Defunct online media ====
- Gamesen.nl
- Gamez.nl
- Bashers.nl

== Video game systems ==
=== Philips CD-i ===
The Philips CD-i (Compact Disc Interactive), first released in 1991, is an interactive multimedia CD player developed and marketed by the Dutch electronics manufacturer Royal Philips Electronics N.V. This category of device was created to provide more functionality than an audio CD player or game console, but at a lower price than a personal computer with a CD-ROM drive at the time. Earlier CD-i games included entries in popular Nintendo franchises, such as Hotel Mario, Link: The Faces of Evil, Zelda: The Wand of Gamelon and Zelda's Adventure, although those games were not developed by Nintendo. In addition to games, a lot of educational and multimedia reference titles were produced for the system, such as interactive encyclopedias, museum tours, etc. The CD-i was a commercial failure, selling 1 million units across all manufactures in 7 years, and losing Phillips $1 billion.

=== Other Consoles ===
- Swinxs
- Tovertafel

== European video game rating ==
The Netherlands Institute for the Classification of Audiovisual Media (NICAM) is the institute responsible for the software given for review for the European video game content rating system PEGI. Because the Netherlands does not mention gaming in their law, selling games with a higher rating to minors is not a criminal offense.

== Video game events in the Netherlands ==
Between 2005 and 2013, the NLGD Festival of Games was an annual trade show for the national and international video games industry, with an attendance of over 1,500 visitors in 2013.

Between 2005 and 2009, Amsterdam was the host city to Casual Connect Europe, the world's leading trade show for casual games. After a four-year absence, Amsterdam hosted Casual Connect once more in February 2014.

Over the years, there have been 2 large consumer events, until 2007 this was 'Gameplay'. From 2008 the event is organized by Blammo Events and is called Firstlook, the event is held annually in the Jaarbeurs Utrecht. Since 2015 the event has been rebranded as Firstlook Festival.

In 2013, Walibi Holland hosted the first edition of Game On, which hosted several video game activities in the theme park. Also in 2013, the Retro Game Experience was first hosted as part of the Sound and Vision experience at the Netherlands Institute for Sound and Vision. Smaller organizations and private collectors also host retro game events on a regular basis.

=== LAN scene ===
In the Netherlands, several large and smaller LAN parties and other gaming events are held yearly. In recent years, the 1000+ visitors have declined in popularity, with the scene seeing a shift towards smaller, more sociable events and/or events that offer more than just non-stop gaming. Additional activities include (outdoor) sports events, quizzes and other non-gaming competitions. In addition, small LAN-parties held at home for typically 5–15 visitors, remain popular.

A notable organization is Gameparty.net, a website that functions as a central hub in the Dutch game event scene, who also hosts two large annual events, TheParty and CampZone. Other major LAN-parties and organisations that have organized 1000+ visitor events include Drome, Netgamez, LAN = Life and Regroup. Most of these organizations operate on a non-profit basis, finding sponsors within the computer and gaming world to be able to operate budget-neutral.
