= White Door =

White Door may refer to

- The White Door, a videogame
- White Door (band), 1980s band Clay Records discography
- "White Door", song (performed by A. Pugacheva) composed by Yury Chernavsky
