= Rusty Lake: Roots =

2016 puzzle video game

Rusty Lake Roots
- Developer: Rusty Lake
- Publisher: Rusty Lake
- Platforms: Android; iOS; macOS; Windows
- Release: October 20, 2016
- Genre: Puzzle
- Mode: Single-player

Rusty Lake: Roots is a point-and-click adventure puzzle video game developed and published by Dutch studio Rusty Lake. It was published on October 20, 2016 on Steam and released for Windows, iOS, Android and macOS. The game is the second one in its series, and is centred around the origins of the Vanderboom family and each of its members, living near the Rusty Lake over several generations in 19th-20th centuries.

In August 2026, a prequel called Servant of the Lake, telling about the earlier events before Roots, was released as a fourth game in the Rusty Lake series.

== Gameplay and plot ==
Rusty Lake: Roots begins with James Vanderboom planting a seed in the yard of the house he has inherited in 1860; from there, his literal family tree start sprouting, with each branch offering an encounter with a different family member, with total of 33 available levels. Similar to other games of the series, the player solves puzzles by clicking and swiping, collecting and storing various items and navigating the story into the needed course. Aside from the main levels, the game offers a set of bonus puzzles to complete.

== Reception ==
The game has been widely described as "ghoulish and weird", "dark and strange", containing signature elements of the Rusty Lake series, filled with "funny and unsettling moments." Reviewers also noted particularly difficult and weird solutions to puzzles, and that no knowledge of the previous game of the series, Rusty Lake Hotel, is required to understand the game.
