= Van der Boom =

Van der Boom is a Dutch surname. Notable people with the surname include:

- Claire van der Boom (born 1983), Australian actress
- Jeroen van der Boom (born 1972), Dutch singer
- Laura Vanderboom, Character from Rusty Lake
