= Not even past =

Not even past may refer to:

- "The past is never dead. It's not even past", a line of dialogue spoken by Gavin Stevens, in Requiem for a Nun by William Faulkner
- Not Even Past: Barack Obama and the Burden of Race, a 2010 book by Thomas Sugrue
- "The past is never dead. It's not even past", a phrase appearing across several titles of the famous point-and-click game series "Rusty Lake" and its mobile sister series "Cube Escape".
