= Mousebreaker =

Online game website

Mousebreaker.com
- Website type: Internet games
- Available in: English
- Founded: 2001
- Headquarters: London, England, {{{location_country}}}
- Key people: Richard Pendry: Co-founder; Alick Stott: Co-founder
- Parent: Spil Games
- Website: www.mousebreaker.com
- Launched: 2001
- Current status: Active

Mousebreaker is a UK based casual games website founded in 2001 by Richard Pendry and Alick Stott. One of the earliest browser game portals, the site earned a reputation in terms of publishing sports and, in particular, football games. In 2008, the website was purchased by UK publisher IPC Media for a rumoured seven figure sum. The site was amongst the biggest UK flash games websites, with over 4,500,000 unique users per month. In 2016, Mousebreaker was sold to Spil Games.

== Early games ==
Pendry and Stott first worked together on flash games as a hobby in 2000. Their first projects were a simple penalty shoot out game, and a pool game that would be the basis of the Blast Billiards franchise. Upon licensing copies of both games, the pair realised the potential of their hobby, but it wasn’t until 2003 that Mousebreaker.com was popular enough to be the only source of income for them and they began to work on the website full-time.

== Purchase by IPC Media ==
In June 2008, Mousebreaker was purchased by Time Warner owned IPC Media for a rumoured seven figure sum. The move saw Mousebreaker become part of IPC’s Ignite division, aimed predominantly at the 18-24 male demographic, and home to publications such as Nuts, Loaded and NME.

== Style of games ==
Mousebreaker is best known for its sports and topical games, with titles such as Aporkalypse Now, Spank the Banker, Fat Cat Cashback and 'Bad Adebayor', getting attention from mainstream news outlets. Their sports section remains their most popular area however, and the site’s sheer number of football games has ensured the two are widely associated.

Mousebreaker’s own list of requirements for third party flash developers states that their games are based on the ‘easy to play, difficult to master’ model, with short load-speeds and “a cheeky sense of humour” also required.

== Best-known titles ==
Many of Mousebreaker’s early popular titles gained enough of a following to earn their own websites. Blast Billiards, Flash Cricket, and Camper Strike all proved popular enough to get a unique domain, with Play A Pal and Play For Your Club also registered by Mousebreaker for use with their football volleys games. Among their other titles.

In 2009, Pendry noted that Jumpers for Goalposts – a football lifestyle sim – had gained a loyal and dedicated following. sto Jumpers for Goalposts were released in 2009, 2010, 2011, and 2013. Darts Party along with Top Spinner Cricket proved popular with gamers as well.

Finally, the ambitious Rock Band Sim – which attempted to combine rhythm action gameplay with the management sim genre – got some positive write-ups on casual game sites.

== Mobile gaming ==
In November 2009, it was announced that Mousebreaker had entered into a partnership with CobraMobile to bring some of its titles to the iPhone and iPod Touch through the App Store. The first game, Blast Billiards Touch, was approved by Apple in December 2009. A lite version offering a few levels was released in February 2010. One of their most popular games, Pinch Hitter, has become one of the most visited games of 2010.
