= Chime (video game) =

2010 video game

- Developer: Zoë Mode
- Publisher: OneBigGame
- Composer: Nathan McCree
- Platforms: Xbox 360, Microsoft Windows, PlayStation 3
- Release: February 3, 2010: Xbox 360 February 3, 2010 Windows September 6, 2010 PlayStation 3; NA: March 29, 2011; EU: March 30, 2011
- Genres: Puzzle, music
- Mode: Single-player

Chime is a 2010 music and puzzle video game developed by Zoë Mode, released initially on the Xbox Live Arcade service, and later for Windows. An extended version of the game, called Chime Super Deluxe, was released on the PlayStation Network in March 2011. Chime is the first title released by the non-profit video game publisher OneBigGame.

== Gameplay ==
Screenshot of Time Mode on Moby level

Chime is a block-dropping game. Players control a single shape at a time, and can move, rotate, and then place it onto a grid. A beatline moves across the grid in time with the music, setting off events when it hits placed shapes. Quads are created by placing shapes in solid blocks of 3x3 or more. When a quad is completed and the beat line hits, different musical samples are triggered dependent on its shape. The size of the quad denotes the score, and multipliers can be achieved by having several quads on the screen at once. Once the beatline hits a completed quad, it is stamped down into the grid, earning the player coverage. (n.b.: when the stage's time runs out, all active quads—those that have not finished filling up—are immediately scored and added to the player's coverage, in order to allow awards of coverage bonus time and continued play.)

The overall objective is to achieve 100% coverage to earn more time and score points. The game continues as long as time is available; it is possible to complete full coverage of the grid multiple times.

There are two basic modes in the game, Timed Mode and Free Mode. Timed Mode pits the player against the clock, with three different levels of difficulty based on time limit—9, 6, or 3 minutes (the actual play time is longer, depending on the time bonus earned with every 10% coverage gained). Free Mode acts as a very basic sequencer. There is no time limit and the player is able to place shapes at their leisure to create different sounds and alter the music as they see fit.

== Featured music ==
Chime features a variety of different musical styles and artists. The original release of the game includes five songs, all of which have been donated to the game pro bono by the respective artists. The tracks are "Brazil" by Philip Glass, "Ooh Yeah" by Moby, "For Silence" by Paul Hartnoll of Orbital (a band that, coincidentally, also had a breakout hit song titled Chime), "Spilled Cranberries" by Markus Schulz, and "Disco Ghosts" by Fred Deakin of Lemon Jelly. In addition, the later Windows version of Chime featured a new level based on "Still Alive" from the popular 2007 video game Portal. The song, written by Jonathan Coulton, can be heard during the closing credits of Portal, with Ellen McLain singing in character as GLaDOS. The music was produced for the game by Marc Canham, who manipulated the music to fit into the gameplay.

== Reception ==
Reception

Aggregate score
Aggregator	Score
Metacritic	(X360) 79/100 (PS3) 78/100 (PC) 73/100

Review scores
Publication	Score
Destructoid	(X360) 7/10
Eurogamer	7/10
Game Informer	(PS3) 8/10
GamePro	(PS3) 4/5
GameSpot	(X360) 8/10
GameTrailers	(X360) 8.2/10
Gamezebo	(PC) 4.5/5
GameZone	(X360) 8.5/10
IGN	(PS3) 8.5/10 (X360) 8/10
Official Xbox Magazine (US)	(X360) 6.5/10
PC Gamer (UK)	(PC) 73%
PlayStation: The Official Magazine	(PS3) 7/10
Push Square	(PS3) 9/10
The Telegraph	(X360) 8/10
Teletext GameCentral	(X360) 7/10

The Xbox 360 version and Chime Super Deluxe received "generally favorable reviews", while the PC version received "mixed or average reviews", according to the review aggregation website Metacritic. IGN said of the Xbox 360 version, "Chime is easy to recommend. It's cheap, it'll keep you amused for hours, and the $5 you spend goes to charity." However, Edge gave the Super Deluxe edition a score of six out of ten, saying, "At worst, the game's deliberate openness means theme and gameplay have a tenuous relationship."

As of January 2011 the Xbox 360 version sold over 32,974 units worldwide.

== Sequels ==
In July 2015, one of the developers of Chime, Ste Curran, launched a Kickstarter campaign for a sequel, titled Chime Sharp. The campaign was successfully funded on August 10, 2015, and an early access build of the game was released on Steam shortly after, featuring a song by Chipzel.

One of the campaign's stretch goals would have provided funding for a further sequel with a chiptune and retro graphics theme, titled Chime Flat. When the Kickstarter campaign fell short of this stretch goal, Curran re-ran the Chime Sharp campaign on Indiegogo in an attempt to secure the remaining funds needed for Chime Flat. However, the Indiegogo campaign failed to raise the remaining funds, and there have been no other plans announced to put Chime Flat into production.

== See also ==
- List of puzzle video games
