= Oh Shit! =

1985 video game

- 1985 MSX cover art
- Developers: The ByteBusters (Oh Shit! & Oh No! - MSX); Eurosoft (Shit! - MSX, Oh Shit! - MSX & MSX2)
- Publishers: Aackosoft (Oh Shit! - MSX); Eaglesoft (Oh Shit! & Oh No! - MSX); Compulogical (Oh Shit! - MSX); Premium III Software Distribution (Shit! - MSX, Oh Shit! - MSX & MSX2)
- Programmers: MSX; Steve Course
- Platforms: MSX, MSX2 (Note: The majority of MSX games are compatible with the MSX2 without the need for the game to be patched for compatibility, but Oh Shit! in the 30 MSX Hits compilation is specifically outlined by several magazines to be MSX2 compatible.)
- Release: 1985: MSX; 1988: MSX2
- Genres: Maze
- Mode: Single-player

Oh Shit! is a Pac-Man clone released in 1985 for the MSX developed by The ByteBusters and published by Aackosoft under the Classics range of games; a range that consists of clones of arcade games. Oh Shit!'s level and art design is identical to that of Pac-Man, but features digitized speech; when the player loses a life, the eponymous phrase "Oh Shit!" is said.

Oh Shit! was twice republished with differing titles and cover art; in the United Kingdom as Oh No! due to the title being considered too obscene for a video game, and for the European re-release by Premium III Software Distribution as Shit!, of which uses cover art from the 1985 horror novel The Howling III: Echoes without permission. For both renamed releases, the speech is changed accordingly.

== Gameplay ==
Oh Shit! was noted by many reviewers to be very visually similar to Pac-Man.

Oh Shit!'s gameplay is identical to that of Pac-Man, down to the level design. This was noted as a positive by reviewers who deemed it a faithful reproduction of the arcade original. The ghosts in Oh Shit! are named Joey, Paul, Willy, and Frankie.

== Development ==
Oh Shit! was coded by Steve Course. The speech generation code was written by Ronald van der Putten, and Oh Shit!'s speech was performed by Ronald van der Putten of The ByteBusters.

MSX Computing states in their review that they received two copies of the game for their review, both the UK Oh No! version and the European Oh Shit! version, stating that the European version's name was "deigned unsuitable for the UK". The MSX UK Oh No! version cost £2.99 in 1986. The MSX version of Oh Shit! originally cost ƒ29.50 Dutch Guilder in 1985, and was reduced to ƒ14.95 in 1987. In 1988, the cassette release of 30 MSX Hits was ƒ49.90, and the floppy disk release was ƒ79.90.

== Releases ==
The 1985 MSX release was published by Aackosoft. However, later releases of the MSX version were released by different publishers: the European version of Oh Shit! was later published by Eaglesoft (an alternate label of Aackosoft), and Oh Shit! was published by Compulogical in Spain. The UK release, Oh No!, was also published by Eaglesoft. The European re-release, Shit!, was developed by Eurosoft and published by Premium III Software Distribution, notably using cover art from the 1985 horror novel The Howling III: Echoes, possibly without permission. The original MSX version of Oh Shit! was made for compatibility with MSX 32K computers, and later re-releases offer MSX 64K compatibility. Unlike other Aackosoft titles in the Classics range, Oh Shit! is incompatible with MSX 16K computers.

Aackosoft went bankrupt in 1988, after which Shit!, alongside other Aackosoft titles, were re-published by Premium III Software Distribution and developed by Eurosoft (a former label of Aackosoft) in the same year. Premium III Software Distribution released the 30 MSX Hits compilation in 1988, including Oh Shit! as part of its lineup. According to Dutch gaming magazine MSX-DOS Computer Magazine, after Aackosoft went bankrupt in 1988, their intellectual property was transferred to a company called Methodic Solutions, and all previous MSX Aackosoft titles were re-published by Premium III Software Distribution and developed by Eurosoft, both separately and in a compilation titled 30 MSX Hits.

The 1988 30 MSX Hits compilation release of Oh Shit! offers MSX2 compatibility. All MSX releases of Oh Shit!, Shit! and Oh No! are cassette releases, except for the 30 MSX Hits release, which had both cassette and floppy disk releases.

=== Version differences ===
Oh Shit! introduces the game's ghosts on the title screen using digitized speech stating "This is Joey, Paul, Willy and Frankie", however the UK version Oh No! says "This is Joey, this is Paul, this is Willy, and this is Frankie". "This is" has the same enunciation all four times it is said. Unlike Oh Shit!, where "Oh Shit!" is said every time the player dies, in Oh No!, "Oh No!" is only said after the player has lost all their lives and gets a game over.

Oh Shit! Death Sound
Oh Shit!'s digitized speech was noted by reviewers as a feature that differentiates itself from Pac-Man.

Oh No! Death Sound
Oh Shit! was censored for its UK release, and "Oh Shit!" was changed to "Oh No!".

== Reception ==
Reception

Review scores
Publication	Score
MSX Gids	4.5/5 (Oh Shit! - MSX)
MSX Computing	2/3 (Oh No! - MSX)
MSX Club Magazine	9/10 (Oh Shit! - MSX)

Oh Shit! was generally positively received by reviewers, who considered it to be a faithful reproduction of Pac-Man, and several reviewers praised the addition of digitized speech. Oh Shit! was predominantly reviewed in Dutch gaming magazines, as Oh Shit! was developed & originally published in the Netherlands.

Dutch gaming magazine MSX Gids gave the MSX version of Oh Shit! an overall score of 4.5 out of five, rating graphics, game quality, and price five stars, but giving sound three stars. MSX Gids criticises Oh Shit!'s sound effects, stating that "The speech, which gets boring quickly, has been added at the expense of the original wokka-wokka sounds. Too bad."

Dutch gaming magazine MSX Computer Magazine reviewed the MSX version of Oh Shit! alongside other Aackosoft titles based upon arcade titles, Boom (Galaxian), Scentipede (Centipede), and Hopper (Frogger). MSX Computer Magazine praises Oh Shit!'s gameplay, calling Oh Shit! a "perfect reproduction of the original arcade game", and praising the inclusion of the 'coffee break' cutscenes from the original Pac-Man that play as intermissions between levels. MSX Computer Magazine further notes Oh Shit!'s similarity to Pac-Man, stating that the levels are "identical to the arcade original", but expresses that Oh Shit! differentiates itself through the addition of speech. MSX Computer Magazine criticises Oh Shit!'s incompatibility with MSX 16Ks.

MSX Computer Magazine, now named MSX-DOS Computer Magazine, reviewed the MSX version of Shit! alongside other arcade clones, particularly comparing it to another Pac-Man clone, Maze Master, stating that they prefer the original Pac-Man or Shit! over Maze Master. MSX-DOS expresses that they mourned Aackosoft's bankruptcy, stating that "Shit! used to be a favorite of mine, Pac-Man fan that I am, and with the loss of Aackosoft a good program was withdrawn from rotation", praising the game's re-publishing by Premium III Software. MSX-DOS criticises the shortening of the game's speech of "Oh Shit!" to just "Shit!", but still expresses that "Despite that, Shit! still always remains a sublime Pac-Man, too bad about the change of voice acting."

MSX-DOS Computer Magazine reviewed the MSX version of Oh Shit! in 1988 as part of the compilation release 30 MSX Hits, expressing that "Oh Shit! is a good Pac-Man-clone with a great name". MSX-DOS Computer Magazine notes 30 MSX Hits' MSX2 compatibility, further expressing that not all MSX games offer this compatibility, stating "So you thought that any MSX program could be used on any MSX computer? As long as you don't try MSX2 software on MSX1 hardware? Well, everyone thought that, in the past. Before the MSX standard was well defined, game programmers sometimes did not adhere to that standard. There has been a lot of trouble with non-running games in the past." Oh Shit!'s MSX2 compatibility was also noted by MSX Club Magazine in their review of 30 MSX Hits in 1988.

British gaming magazine MSX Computing gave the UK MSX version, Oh No!, an overall score of two out of three stars, noting its similarity to Pac-Man, stating that "Pac-man fans will love this game as it is based very much along the same lines." MSX Computing praises Oh No!'s digitized speech, expressing that "The speech is a really novel and fun feature and does much to enhance the game" and further noting Oh No! as "far superior" to similar games due to its speech capability. MSX Computing praises Oh No!'s gameplay, calling it "addictive" and "an easy game to play", further recommending it due to its low price of £2.99 in 1986.

Dutch gaming magazine MSX Club Magazine reviewed the MSX version of Oh Shit! in 1986, giving it an overall score of 9/10, beginning their description of Oh Shit!'s gameplay by stating "You already know how to play it: it's Pac-Man." MSX Club called Oh Shit!'s graphics "not graphically amazing, but this doesn't hinder gameplay", and criticised Oh Shit!'s sound effects, stating that "Beyond the typical irritating Pac-Man sounds there's also speech present", and calls the death message of "Oh Shit!" "terrible shouting". MSX Club notes a difficulty curve in Oh Shit! as the game progresses, and praises the addition of cutscenes.
