= Servant of the Lake =

2026 puzzle video game

- Developer: Rusty Lake
- Publisher: Rusty Lake
- Composer: Victor Butzelaar
- Platforms: Microsoft Windows, iOS, Android
- Release: August 13, 2026
- Genre: Puzzle video game
- Mode: Single-player

Servant of the Lake is a point-and-click adventure puzzle video game developed and published by Dutch studio Rusty Lake. It was announced on May 1, 2025, as part of celebrating 10 years of Rusty Lake franchise, together with The Mr. Rabbit Magic Show. Announcement trailer was published on August 21, 2025, and a playable demo version of the game was published on Steam on October 13, 2025. The game was released on August 13, 2026, for Windows, iOS and Android, and serves as a prequel to Rusty Lake: Roots.

== Gameplay and plot ==
The game is set in the house of Vanderboom family, decades before the events of Rusty Lake: Roots, in 1839, where two brothers, Aldous and William, are attempting to brew the elixir of life. The player controls the housekeeper of the Vanderboom estate, performing their duties, ranging from simple tasks such as straightening the portraits, doing the laundry or cooking breakfast, to assisting in complex experiments and cleaning up the aftermath, searching for alchemical secrets.

== Reception ==
Reception

Aggregate scores
Aggregator	Score
Metacritic	(PC) 79/100
OpenCritic	92% recommend

The PC version of Servant of the Lake received generally favorable reviews from critics, according to the review aggregation website Metacritic. Fellow review aggregator OpenCritic assessed that the game received "mighty" approval, being recommended by 92% of critics.

Similar to other Rusty Lake games, Servant of the Lake has been highlighted as having "mysterious and creepy atmosphere" with elements of dark humour. Reviewers noted surrealism, complexity and brilliance of puzzles, the game having an "intuitive logic of a dream", giving highly positive reviews, with some calling it "one of the best point-and-click games of recent years." PC Gamer described Servant of the Lake as a "grim, sinister tale of family, destiny, and cooking" that follows traditions of previous games of the series, offering a freedom in secrets and hidden content.
