= Rusty Lake Paradise =

2018 puzzle video game

- Developer: Rusty Lake
- Publisher: Rusty Lake
- Platforms: Android; iOS; macOS; Windows
- Release: January 11, 2018
- Genre: Puzzle
- Mode: Single-player

Rusty Lake Paradise is a point-and-click adventure puzzle video game developed and published by Dutch studio Rusty Lake. It was published on January 11, 2018 on Steam and released for Windows, iOS, Android and macOS. It is the third of four official Rusty Lake games, and is centred around the Eilander family and the story of Mr. Owl in the late 18th century.

== Gameplay and plot ==
The game starts in 1796, when Jakob Eilander returning to a small, isolated island named Paradise to his family, after his mother had passed away. After her mysterious death, the island is cursed with the biblical ten plagues of Egypt, which slowly come one after another - Water turns into Blood, Frogs, Gnats & Lice, Flies, Diseased Livestock, Boils, Hail, Locusts, Darkness and Death of the Firstborn. The player needs to survive the plagues and discover the truth behind the death of Jakob's mother Caroline Eilander, simultaneously taking part in strange family rituals in order to bring the plagues to a halt. Throughout the game, the ghost of Caroline will follow Jackob and guide him to retrieve her memories, ending the plagues.

== Reception ==
Like all other Rusty Lake games, Paradise has been described as "weird, creepy and gross" with lots of mystery and secrets. Reviewers noted the short length of the game, and level of bizarreness that even other Rusty Lake games do not possess.
