= Zylom =

Distributor of online casual games

GameHouse Europe B.V., doing business as Zylom, is a Dutch distributor of casual games for computers, smartphones and tablets. It was founded as an independent company in 2001 and became a part of RealNetworks in 2006.

== History ==
Zylom Media Group was founded in Eindhoven in 2001. The company was founded by nine employees of the former Gamegate, which was liquidated on 15 June. The launch of the company was plagued by legal disputes between its employees and those of games website Wildape, which had acquired the assets of Gamegate, and claimed to be its continuation.

In its early years, its audience was largely female. In the Netherlands, per an NFO Trendbox survey, the average female Zylom user at the time was aged 34, lived in families of three or more people, watched RTL 4 and was a consumer of magazines such as Allerhande and Libelle. In 2002, it received an investment from ABN AMRO.

In February 2006, RealNetworks bought Zylom Media Group for US$21 million (€17,2 million). That same year, it released the Delicious series of games, the first to be released for mobile platforms. A partnership with King.com was announced in 2007.

On 6 February 2008, the game studio was renamed RealGames, while the Zylom brand continued on its website. Subsequently, the studio was renamed GameHouse in September 2011, as part of a process initiated by GameHouse to unite all of its game studios under that name. The Eindhoven studio is currently used to make most of GameHouse's titles for mobile platforms, most of them attracting female audiences.
