= Spil Games =

Dutch video game developer

- Formerly: Spill Group (2001–2008)
- Type: Subsidiary
- Industry: Video games
- Founded: 2001; 25 years ago
- Founders: Peter Driessen; Bennie Eeftink
- Defunct: 2020
- Fate: Mobile game division acquired by Azerion in 2019; Rest of Spil Games acquired by Azerion in 2020
- Headquarters: Hilversum, Netherlands
- Parent: Azerion (2020–present)
- Website: spilgames.com (defunct)

Spil Games was a Dutch video game developer based in Hilversum. The company published free-to-play games for Android and iOS devices, as well as for the Facebook Platform.

== History ==
Peter Driessen and Bennie Eeftink founded Spill Group in 2001. The company launched its first games website, spelletjes.nl, in 2004.

In 2007, Spill Group acquired a majority share in the Chinese game development company zLong and began producing games. That same year, the company also expanded its portals to the US and UK.

The 2008 acquisition of the MMO (massive multiplayer online) site/community, onrpg.com, moved the company into the MMORPG segment.

In July 2008, Spill group changed the company name and rebranded to Spil Games.

In 2012, it was reported that Spil Games' U.S.-based teenage girl GirlsGoGames.com was one of the top websites that U.S. people, mostly girls, visited when online. People most frequently played games that involved cooking, dress-up, flash games, and quizzes. The most popular game girls played on GirlsGoGames.com was Pet Party.

In total, Spil Games expanded its segmented and localized approach with more than 50 websites where people can play games online in 20 languages. 80% of its games are from third-party developers, as of 2012. This reaches a large audience of 190 million monthly users on average.

In May 2014 the company announced that it will let go of a substantial portion of its workforce – 90 out of 240 full-time positions – as a result of a move from website to mobile and tablet games.

In September 2014, the company reorganised, closing its Dutch development studio and concentrating on mobile game publishing.

=== Turnaround ===
In February 2015, a new CEO was appointed. Tung Nguyen-Khac had been CEO of the gaming division of the German television company ProSiebenSat1. VentureBeat said of the move: "With the mobile-gaming industry growing to $25 billion in 2014, it's not surprising that a company like Spil would look for new leadership to help get a bigger piece of that action." On 16, August, 2016 Spil Games announced it achieved 100 million downloads in the last 12 months. Pocket Gamer said of the announcement that Spil "had originally hoped to reach this milestone by the end of 2016, and has now revised its goal up to 150 million for the end of the year"

By February 2017, the company had achieved 200 million mobile downloads. This grew to 250 million by July 2017. The company announced it hit 300 million installs in March 2018 with the growth being 95% organic. VentureBeat stated this is, "a testament to the company's method of testing titles on the web and then reposting the most popular titles as mobile apps.

On 24 May 2018, it was announced Spil's COO Timm Geyer had been named the company's new CEO. As reported by PocketGamer.biz his focus will be building on Spil's strategy of bringing its most successful web IPs to mobile.

=== New games ===
In the first part of 2016, the company announced and launched several game brands. In February 2016, it purchased the rights to the classic game Creatures In April 2016, Atari founder Nolan Bushnell announced that he would be working with Spil to develop several new mobile games. In May 2016, Spil Games acquired the browser game portal Mousebreaker.

Europacorp, Luc Besson's film studio, selected Spil Games to create the official mobile game for Valerian and the City of a Thousand Planets, the director's upcoming $180M sci-fi movie. The company revealed the first details about the game in May 2017.

Facebook chose Spil Games as a launch partner for Instant Games on 29 November. Spil's Endless Lake is one of 17 games to be featured in Instant Games where players can play games directly on Messenger or their Facebook News Feed. Three weeks later Facebook named Endless Lake as on its Games of the Year. Spil Games launched its second Instant Games, Tomb Runner, in April 2017.

In May 2017, Spil Games launched Operate Now: Hospital a hospital simulation game for iOS and Android. The game exceeded 10 million installs in 6 months.

Spil Games published Mahjong Crimes in November 2017; a new game bringing together Mahjong Solitaire and the murder mystery Murder on the Orient Express by Agatha Christie.

In June 2019, Azerion acquired Spil Games' mobile games division, alongside a 5% stake in the company itself, to undisclosed terms. Azerion subsequently acquired the remainder of Spil Games in February 2020 and installed Erol Erturk as the managing director.

== Audience ==
In mobile, the company started from nowhere and had 50 million installs in 2015. By February 2017, the company had achieved 200 million mobile downloads. In March 2018 the company hit 300 million installs. Installs are driven by games like the Troll Face Quest series, which has racked up 100 million installs, Uphill Rush, which has garnered 25 million downloads, and Operate Now: Hospital, which has 15 million.
