= Good Job! =

2020 Nintendo video game

- Developer: Paladin Studios (Note: Additional work by Nintendo Software Technology)
- Publisher: Nintendo
- Directors: Masataka Takemoto; Kenta Usui; Coen Neessen
- Producers: Katsuya Eguchi; Toyokazu Nonaka; Fernando Rojas Braga
- Designer: Kyle Gaynier
- Programmer: Pieter Peeters
- Artists: Lauren 't Jong; Benjamin Paulus
- Composer: Antonio Teoli
- Engine: Unity
- Platform: Nintendo Switch
- Release: March 26, 2020
- Genres: Puzzle, action
- Modes: Single-player, multiplayer

Good Job! is a 2020 puzzle video game developed by Dutch developer Paladin Studios and published by Nintendo for the Nintendo Switch console. The player controls a megacorporation CEO's son in completing exaggerated office tasks in destructive playground-style puzzles to climb the corporate ladder. Although there are normal ways to complete the levels, the player can be as destructive and creative as they like to beat the level faster.

After good impressions from both companies, Nintendo and Paladin Studios met together to create an experimental game. They had the intentions of appealing to a broad audience, using time zones and locations to their advantage. The game was announced and released in March 2020. The game received generally positive reviews, with reviewers praising the exaggerated gameplay and office setting.

== Gameplay ==
The player preparing to shoot a projector through the wall rather than navigating it via the doorway. They are using a wire to act as a slingshot.

The player controls the son of a CEO of a major megacorporation; their goal is to complete tasks throughout the building to climb the corporate ladder. These goals are common office tasks, such as setting up a projector for a conference meeting. These tasks can be completed in a multitude of ways, although most can be described as either "non-destructive" or "chaotic"; for example, the player could either navigate the projector throughout the rooms, or simply form a slingshot and launch it through the walls instead. Upon completing the task, the player is graded on how long it took to complete the level, as well as the number of objects destroyed and the monetary repair costs for damage; although grades are given for all three of these, the overall grade is generally based around time, so causing costly damage but completing the level quickly will still result in a good overall grade. The gameplay is broken up into levels with each level being a different floor that covers a different type of business. Clothing pieces can be found throughout the game that allow the player to customize their character's appearance. The game supports local multiplayer with one other person, allowing for two players to complete the puzzles at one time.

== Development and release ==
Paladin Studios logo

Most of the developers at Paladin Studios had played games from Nintendo, and had been trying to do a collaboration for about ten years. Nintendo's producer, Takao Nakano, played some of the company's mobile games, and believed they put care into them. A team from Nintendo met with the company in 2017, and was interested in a prototype conceptualized by Paladin Studios. Paladin Studios wanted to make a game that was easily accessible to a broad audience; they wanted a game that could be enjoyed by children and adults, as well as one that had simple controls. They decided to set the game in an office setting, as it was easily recognizable and would allow players to use common objects in surprising ways. They liked the contrast of a mundane office setting with chaotic and destructive actions.

Nintendo and Paladin Studios discussed regularly and worked together on the game very closely, actively video chatting each other to collaborate. Paladin Studios, located in The Netherlands, would create a working prototype of the game and send it to Nintendo in Japan for review every day. Both countries have opposite time zones, so every morning Nintendo had a prototype they could review, and every morning Paladin Studios had a review back from Nintendo. Due to both companies being in different parts of the world, it helped further their intentions of being enjoyable by a larger group of players. Although both companies had similar ideas, they sometimes had conflicting opinions on the office setting, as certain parts of a typical building were different in the two countries.

The developers encountered multiple bugs during the game's creation, such as glitch where every object in the level would immediately be destroyed. One of the glitches, where a printer wrapped in a cable would cause it to be violently launched in all directions, inspired the creators to increase the launch speed of cables. Due to the game revolving around physics, play testers found it enjoyable to search for hidden bugs.

The game had a two-year development cycle, and was announced on March 26, 2020, releasing the same day. Nintendo only told Paladin Studios that the game would be featured in a Nintendo Direct shortly before the announcement, which caught the company by surprise. Paladin Studios commented how "Nintendo did a tremendous job at guiding us through this process and really helped us make the best content we could possibly make."

== Reception ==
Reception

Aggregate scores
Aggregator	Score
Metacritic	78/100
OpenCritic	80% recommend

Review scores
Publication	Score
Destructoid	8/10
Eurogamer	4/5
GameSpot	7/10
Nintendo Life	9/10
Nintendo World Report	9/10

Good Job! received "generally favorable" reviews, receiving a 78% on review aggregator platform Metacritic. Fellow review aggregator OpenCritic assessed that the game received strong approval, being recommended by 80% of critics.

Reviewers praised the general gameplay, being able to solve the problem with multiple solutions. Critics liked the multiple approaches to completing tasks, with Nintendo Life noting that it results in good replayability, that each level has a multitude of objectives based on how quickly or how much money is spent. Some liked the amount of physical objects that could be destroyed, of which being called satisfying. Eurogamer reviewer Christian Donlan praised the increased difficulty of each level, saying how it fit well with the silly graphics and theme. Siliconera liked the simplistic graphics, calling them colorful and abstract.

Many critics understood the theme of wanting to break the rules and cause destruction in an office setting. Donlan was fond of how certain tasks are exaggerated, such as making it extremely difficult to move an oversized photocopier through a doorway, which increased his desire to smash it through a wall instead. Due to the game releasing during the COVID-19 pandemic, reviewers found it enjoyable to play around in an office space, something that they had missed during quarantine.

Slight negativity came from how multiplayer is not much different from singleplayer. Reviewers were upset how levels were exactly the same, and expressed how it could lead to the loss of coordination and double the amount of accidental damage. Nonetheless, they enjoyed how it could result in faster times if the players work together well. Destructoid's CJ Andriessen had an issue with picking up objects; he said that the character would accidentally pick up the wrong object, most of the time causing accidental destruction, ruining a peaceful playthrough.

== See also ==
- Enercities – a game created by Paladin Studios
