= Rusty Lake Hotel =

2015 video game

- Developer: Rusty Lake
- Publisher: Rusty Lake
- Platforms: Android; iOS; macOS; Windows
- Release: Android, iOS: WW: December 14, 2015; macOS, Windows: WW: January 29, 2016
- Genre: Puzzle
- Mode: Single-player

Rusty Lake Hotel is a 2015 point-and-click puzzle video game developed by Dutch Studio Rusty Lake in which players attempt to solve surreal puzzles in a hotel filled with guests. It was released on December 14, 2015 on Android and on January 29, 2016 on Steam.

== Gameplay ==
Gameplay screenshot.

Five guests are invited to a hotel on an lake island to experience unforgettable meals. Each guest looks like an anthropomorphic animal and unaware that each of them will be served as a part of the meal for other guests. Players control a hotel employee, Harvey, a humanoid parrot, tasked with killing and serving the guests for dinner. After entering each guest's room, players must use items found there to solve puzzles, reaching the eventual goal of performing a murder; until then, they are locked inside the room, similar to escape room video games.

== Plot ==
The Hotel is owned by Mr. Owl - similarly, a humanoid owl being - who orders to murder guests in order to extract their memory cubes, which are a substantial component to accessing the past and future of the person. After serving the last fifth meal to the Mr. Owl, the player will be shown a mysterious person riding an elevator below the lake, who will turn out to be Dale Vandermeer.

== Development ==
Rusty Lake, an independent studio in Amsterdam, had previously made the Cube Escape series of free puzzle games. They felt these games were good enough to require payment. However, Rusty Lake worried they would have difficulty standing out in the crowded indie game scene, and they wanted to build a community. Rusty Lake Hotel was their first paid game. It is set in the same surreal world and intersects with the Cube Escape stories, which helped to transition the free-to-play fans to the later paid games. Rusty Lake released the title for Android and iOS on December 14, 2015, and for macOS and Windows on January 29, 2016.

== Reception ==
Rusty Lake Hotel received mixed reviews on Metacritic. GamesRadar+ praised its macabre atmosphere and compared the art to the work of Edward Gorey. Despite disliking puzzle games, Rock Paper Shotgun's reviewer said he enjoyed Rusty Lake Hotel because he enjoyed the atmosphere and art so much. Gamezebo praised the art and story, but criticized the mobile version's user interface, which they said required precise tapping to interact with the puzzles. They also disliked the lack of spoiler-free hints. Although they enjoyed the premise and art style, Adventure Gamers said it would likely appeal only to Cube Escape fans because of what they felt were illogical puzzles and a lack of plot.
