= ISOTX =

Dutch independent video game developer

- Type: Private
- Industry: Video games
- Founded: 2005
- Founder: Vincent van Geel (co-founder) Byron Rupp (co-founder)
- Products: MidEast Crisis Iron Grip: The Oppression; Iron Grip: Warlord; Iron Grip: Lords of War; MidEast Crisis 2 Iron Grip: Marauders
- Website: ISOTX.com

ISOTX was a Dutch independent video game developer founded by Vincent van Geel and Byron Rupp in 2005. In 2014 Vincent van Geel left the company. The company continued on, yet dissolved December 2015.

Their first release was the MidEast Crisis mod for C&C Generals. This was followed by Iron Grip: The Oppression, a mod for Half-Life 2. Since Iron Grip: The Oppression, nearly all ISOTX games have been set in the Iron Grip Universe; a dieselpunk alternative reality setting.

In 2008 ISOTX released their first commercial game, Iron Grip: Warlord, which received somewhat mixed reviews. IGN only gave the game 4.5/10, but other smaller websites gave more positive reviews. The gameplay in Iron Grip: Warlord offered a mix of first-person shooter and tower defense gameplay. While defending against waves of attacking enemies, players had to hunt down enemy officers to reduce enemy morale and win the battle. In 2012, ISOTX released the Scorched Earth DLC for Iron Grip: Warlord on Steam, which added new weapons, enemies, and a deathmatch game mode

The next game released by ISOTX was the free-to-play strategy MMO Iron Grip: Lords of Atelia, which would later be renamed to Iron Grip: Lords of War.

In 2011, ISOTX launched the open beta of their second free-to-play strategy MMO, Iron Grip: Marauders, which featured 3D turn-based battles using the Unity game engine. The game was released through Steam, an online distributor, as part of their Free to Play catalog on September 30, 2011. Iron Grip: Marauders became available on Amazon.com through their Games Connect feature in 2012. Marauders has received a number of significant updates, often changing gameplay or other major features. It received a notable visual upgrade on March 18, 2011. To highlight the 3D capabilities of the game, the developers changed the view from an isometric camera to a perspective camera and added a zoom function to allow players to look more closely at units and structures. The developers also upgraded the internal Unity engine from 2.7 to 3.0, with plans to make use of the new engine's capabilities to add lighting effects and more detailed terrain maps in later patches. The "Boss Smash Patch" released in May 2011 included a day and night cycle, more units, avatar customization, and bosses which randomly attack players. Other changes include a base building system where players could place structures and units to produce income and defend the base (this was later removed), the introduction of a smuggling system, and more recently an assault system where players could pick units to go on an automated 10‑minute battle. In April 2012, ISOTX partnered with QINQO, meaning that people in Belgium and the Netherlands could buy in-game currency from shops in the form of prepaid QINQO cards.

In March 2013 ISOTX revealed their new project, a free online multiplayer game, March of War. It's going to be a F2P strategic, turn-based episodic multiplayer world war online game for PC, Mac, Android, and iOS. March of War takes places in an alternate dieselpunk-influenced 1940 world, where democratically elected players lead six warring factions through the turn-based episodic struggle for world domination. It's the world's first episodic free-to-play game based on the TV series model. The game promises over 80 units and 60 maps with four gameplay modes. Every month a new episode is released bringing a number of new features to the game.

== Games ==
=== Iron Grip: Lords of War ===
Iron Grip: Lords of War
- The interface of Iron Grip: Lords of War

Iron Grip: Lords of War (previously Lords of Atelia) was a free-to-play online browser game. The game was closed down in early 2014.

In Lords of War, game players gather resources (primarily power, coal, and iron) and use them to upgrade the player's camp, hire workers, build defensive and offensive weapons, and to attack other players. Players can also collect gold to exchange for other resources, and gems that can be purchased and exchanged for special benefits through the smugglers at a camp’s airport. Coal and iron can be mined or taken from other players by fighting them. Power generates slowly based on a player's level. Gold is gained by completing some daily decision quests, by sending out gold seekers, by spending gems, or by winning battles on certain servers in the game Iron Grip: Warlord.

As players level up through combat, missions, or upgrading their camp, they gain the ability to build more advanced tools and weapons. To make use of these items, players must choose how to assign their men between defense, offense and mining iron or coal. Leveling up also provides boosts, which can be assigned to areas such as mining efficiency, recruitment cost discounts, power generation and other areas for a permanent improvement.

A new patch which is currently in beta changes the combat by adding hex based maps where players move units in a turn based battle, rather than before where they would send their units into battle, and immediately be told what happened. The length of each turn depends on the type of battle.

There is also an alliance system which allows players to jointly contribute to alliance vaults, walls, and demolishers. Walls provide defensive bonuses to players in the alliance, while demolishers provide bonuses to alliance members when attacking enemy alliances.

=== Other games ===
Other games include: MidEast Crisis, Iron Grip: The Oppression and MidEast Crisis 2.
