= OneBigGame =

Non-profit video game publisher

OneBigGame is the first non-profit video game publisher. The company was founded in 2007 by Martin de Ronde, co-founder formerly of Guerrilla Games. OneBigGame aids in the development of games with other noted developers for the benefit of charitable organizations. The company published its first game, the Zoe Mode developed music/puzzle game Chime, on February 3, 2010, for the Save the Children and the Starlight Children's Foundation organizations. In 2010 the company made a profit of $100,000. 96% of this amount is going to charity.
