= Hooligans: Storm Over Europe =

2002 video game

- Developer: Darxabre
- Publishers: PAL: Darxabre; NA: Hip Games
- Platform: Windows
- Release: 2002
- Genre: Real-time tactics
- Mode: Single-player

Hooligans: Storm Over Europe is a real-time strategy video game developed and published by DarXabre and released for the PC in 2002. The North American release was published by Hip Games.

== Overview ==
The game is played out over a football season and the object of the game is to become the most notorious group of hooligans in Europe and to "kill, maim and destroy the opposing hooligan teams".

The game includes a documentary narrative where a former hooligan turned reporter joins the local firm in the Netherlands for a tour around Europe during a continental championship and their attempt to see that the Dutch get the cup through any means necessary. To achieve this, the player proceeds through a variety of levels set in different locations and must injure or kill every opposing hooligan gang.

The Hooligans are divided into several classes. The Leader is the central member of the entire squad and the only one able to use handguns and rally his men and other members of the firm. The Rat acts as a scout and can break into residential places without alerting the law, but has limited stamina and easily gets drunk and high. The Hooligan is the demolitions expert and is used for crowd control. The Raver is a party-going member who can distract other gang members by using his loud boombox and has strong drug tolerance, but low alcoholic tolerance. The Biker and Bulch have the most health but the Biker can drive any car, using it as a transport or as a weapon against enemies. The Bulch is one of the three major units, an overweight dumb man who functions as the muscle, beating up other hooligans as well as being able to push certain objects to limit the movement of the enemy.

During play the members of the gang must be sustained by administering drugs, alcohol and violence on a regular basis. Failure to keep the gang members fueled will see them drift off to more peaceful and legal activities. Looting of the local shops during the game can provide funds for the gang, and the player must overcome resistance from both rival gangs and the police forces to achieve victory.

== Controversy ==
The game was released in 2002 on the PC to immediate controversy due to its violent content and the perceived promotion of criminal behaviour in football, with some politicians calling for it to be banned. A similar media and political reaction had occurred on release of other controversial video games at the time such as Grand Theft Auto, Postal and Carmageddon, all of which featured or encouraged behaviour which would be illegal in real life; for instance, the Grand Theft Auto series features carjacking, excessive speeding and running over pedestrians. The Dutch developers of the game, DarXabre, defended the title stating that it rewarded strategic thinking rather than violence. In the UK, where the game received an 18 rating from the BBFC, DarXabre self-published the title with trade body ELSPA commenting that "Hooligans is not a game with which the UK games industry wishes to be associated, and we regard it as unfortunate that it has obtained distribution here".
