= Iron Grip: Marauders =

2011 video game

- Logo for Iron Grip: Marauders
- Developer: ISOTX
- Publisher: ISOTX
- Series: Iron Grip
- Engine: Unity
- Platforms: Microsoft Windows, Mac
- Release: January 17, 2011 (open beta); September 30, 2011; July 23, 2014 (closed)
- Genres: Turn-based strategy, Multiplayer online game
- Modes: Single-player, multiplayer

Iron Grip: Marauders was a free-to-play online war game with 3D turn-based battles. Following an open beta the game was released through Steam, the online distributor, on September 30, 2011.

The game was closed down on July 23, 2014.

== Gameplay ==
Iron Grip: Marauders consists of two parts: the strategic resource management and the tactical 3D battles.[3] Players make key decisions affecting progression of scientific research, unit production as well as selecting which battles to fight.[3] When a battle commences, the game switches to a 3D view using the Unity game engine. Using their military stratagems, players are then called upon to deploy troops, previously produced in the management phase.[3]

The strategy section of Iron Grip: Marauders. This image shows Jasmine's Gentlemen's Club, where players can find raid battles and smuggling missions.

The game is currently entirely cooperative, though competitive play is planned to return in the future.

=== Economy ===
A 3D tactical battle in Iron Grip: Marauders. This image shows the unit movement grid, attack range indicator, unit stats, and several units in battle.

There are currently three vital resources in this strategy game: gold, iron, and gems.[3] Gold and iron are procured in bases controlled by the player and are harnessed to produce units, construct buildings, and carry out research.[3] Gems can be purchased with real world currency.[3] They can then be used to buy clothes for the in-game avatar, to develop special units on the black market, or to enter into further battles in a day of violent relaxation.[3]

=== Battles ===
Marauders uses the Unity game engine to depict fights on a 3D battlefield.[3] When battle commences, players decide whether they want to perform a raid to capture and plunder enemy resources. Or attempt a glorious conquest to capture an enemy stronghold.[3] Players must then spend a limited number of deployment points, by selecting which of their units to set up on the battlefield.[3]These battles are then decided during the turn- based tactical combat that ensues.[3] At the beginning of each turn, every unit is given action points, which can either be used to move or attack.[3] Each unit class has unique strengths and weaknesses when attacking, which must be considered in order to choose the most effective unit for a specific task.[3].

== Plot ==
Set soon after Iron Grip: Lords of War, Marauders also takes place within the larger Iron Grip Universe .[5] Two powerful factions stand on the brink of war and between them lies a third: the marauders.[5]

== Development ==
Iron Grip: Marauders was announced by developer and publisher ISOTX on May 13, 2010.[6] ISOTX had previously released the first-person shooter Iron Grip: Warlord and sought to expand the Iron Grip universe through the browser game Marauders.[3] The game entered closed beta on August 9, 2010[7], with over one hundred users at the time the announcement was made.[8] After three stages of closed beta,[9] the game entered into an open beta phase on January 17, 2011.[10] It received a significant visual upgrade on March 18, 2011.[11] In order to highlight the 3D capabilities of the game, the developers changed the view from an isometric camera to a perspective camera[11], adding a zoom function giving the player a closer and more defined view of units and structures.[12] The developers also upgraded the internal Unity engine from 2.7 to 3.0, with further plans to make use of the new engine's capabilities to add lighting effects and superior terrain maps in later patches.[12] The "Boss Smash Patch" released in May 2011 included a day and night cycle, more units, avatar customization, and bosses whose attacks are both brutal and unpredictable.
