= Knight Rider: The Game =

2002 video game on PlayStation 2 and PC

- Developer: Davilex Games
- Publishers: EU: Davilex Games; NA: Tri Synergy
- Series: Knight Rider
- Platforms: PlayStation 2 Windows
- Release: GER: November 8, 2002; UK: November 22, 2002; NA: March 26, 2003 (PC)
- Genres: Action, Racing
- Mode: Single-player

Knight Rider: The Game is a video game developed by Davilex Games based on the original television series of the same name.

The game allows the player to take control of KITT – the Knight Industries Two Thousand, in a range of missions including, racing, exploring, chasing and others. The player will also meet famous villains from the original series, including KARR and Garthe Knight. A Xbox and GameCube version were planned to release, but cancelled.

== Reception ==
Reception

Aggregate scores
| Aggregator | Score | |
| Aggregator | PC | PS2 |
|---|---|---|
| GameRankings | 55% | 41% |
| Metacritic | 54/100 | N/A |

Review scores
| Publication | Score | |
| Publication | PC | PS2 |
|---|---|---|
| 4Players | 59% | 60% |
| Computer Games Magazine | 2.5/5 | N/A |
| Gamekult | 1/10 | 1/10 |
| GameSpot | 5.8/10 | N/A |
| Jeuxvideo.com | 7/20 | N/A |
| PlayStation Official Magazine – UK | N/A | 4/10 |
| PC Gamer (UK) | 61% | N/A |
| PC Gamer (US) | 43% | N/A |
| PC Zone | 42% | N/A |
| X-Play | 3/5 | N/A |

The PC version received "mixed" reviews according to the review aggregation website Metacritic. GamePro Germany criticized the game for its "rubberband AI".

== Sequel ==
A sequel, Knight Rider: The Game 2, was developed by Davilex Games and published by Koch Media for Windows and PlayStation 2 on November 5, 2004. Henry Ernst of GamePro Germany thought of the sequel that the environments were "odd" and the game was pixelated. He did not recommend the game, even if it was for free.

== See also ==
- Knight Rider franchise
