= Iron Grip: Warlord =

2008 video game

- Developer: ISOTX
- Publisher: ISOTX
- Series: Iron Grip
- Engine: id Tech 3
- Platform: Microsoft Windows
- Release: November 5, 2008
- Genres: First-person shooter, tower defense
- Modes: Single-player, multiplayer

Iron Grip: Warlord is the first commercial release from independent video game developer ISOTX. It is a first-person shooter combined with many real-time strategy elements. It uses the id Tech 3 game engine and is set in the fictional universe of Iron Grip.

== Plot ==
=== Setting ===
Map of Kathos, showing the countries residing on the continent.

Iron Grip: Warlord is set in a dieselpunk world with a society that can be described as a blend of Napoleonic era politics and World War II technology. The Iron Grip world is home to many different landmasses, but Warlord focuses on Kathos, a frigid region to the northeast resembling Eastern Europe. Kathos is divided into two large military powers and a handful of neutral countries. To the north is the Sovereign Republic of Rahmos, possessing the world's most powerful airship fleet and a technologically advanced military. Their territory includes a number of client states in addition to their home island. The country of Fahrong (known as the Confederation of Nallum) is the other major power. With uneven and mountainous terrain, the Confederates employ mechanized walkers known as 'Arachs' along with the largest standing army. Central to the game is Atelia, a medium-sized country known for its abundant resources and many different ethnic and tribal groups. At the time of the game, Atelia is a country traditionally divided into city-states and nomads. Its lands are contested by the two Kathos military powers and the remaining scraps of the country are ruled by Warlords.

== Factions ==
The warring factions in the game are the Atelian Militia and the Confederation of Nallum. The Atelians are making their last stand in the city-states which the Confederates strive to take control of at any cost.

=== Atelian Militia ===
The Atelian Militia is a mixture of armed citizens, organized resistance and allied nomadic warriors. Their primary objective is to slow the march of the Confederate armies by any means possible while reducing their public support and encouraging Atelian civilian resistance.

=== The Confederation of Nallum ===
The Confederation consists of modern armies with millions of troops and nearly unlimited resources.

== Gameplay ==
The gameplay revolves around fighting off large invading armies with a small elite group in an urban setting. Players must deploy defenses via an overhead construction interface and ensure their stronghold survives wave after wave of AI-controlled enemy soldiers without being overwhelmed. This scale of battle is achieved by combining real-time strategy construction with first-person combat to create the ultimate defense game. What makes Iron Grip: Warlord unique is that it mixes equal amounts of first-person shooting and real-time strategy elements. It uses a variety of weapons from the musket to flamethrowers to heavy machine guns.

== Distribution ==
Iron Grip: Warlord is available through an independent distribution platform at ISOTX's online web-store. It is also available on Direct2Drive, GamersGate, Valve's Steam and Stardock's Impulse digital distribution platform. On December 22, 2008, ISOTX released a major update, marketed as a "free expansion" entitled The Winter Offensive. It contains new units, a new level, and many other fixes. A demo has been released, which offers one map, on skirmish, LAN or on the internet.

== Development ==
The game is developed by ISOTX, previously known for their "MidEast Crisis" mod for C&C Generals and Iron Grip: The Oppression, a total conversion mod for Half-Life 2 (HL2). Both are still available on the developers' site at www.isotx.com. A sequel to the MidEast Crisis mod called MidEast Crisis 2 has been developed for "Command & Conquer 3: Tiberium Wars", and ISOTX are currently working on the free to play strategy game Iron Grip: Marauders.

Iron Grip: Warlord was released on November 5, 2008.

== Reception ==
Iron Grip: Warlord was released to generally mixed reviews currently holding an aggregate score of 59% based on 4 reviews at Metacritic. IGN gave the game a 4.5/10, with the headline "Lay down your weapons – this one's not worth fighting for." Much of the criticism from IGN was centered on the game's execution, particularly the lack of balance in the RTS mode, as well as the AI and unsatisfactory pathfinding.

Smaller resources, like Games Abyss, found the game much more satisfactory, offering praise for the unique concept and the execution from an independent gaming company's first commercial title. Andreas Asimakis of Games Abyss said of the game, "If Iron Grip: Warlord is any indication, Isotx should be considered a creative force to be reckoned with. Delivering the best aspects of first person shooters and blending the experience with RTS elements has made for an amazing combination. Iron Grip is nothing but simple fun and players wanting a distraction from those prettier and more expensive titles should make it a point to purchase Iron Grip."

Similar praise and commentary came from Gamers Daily News, which rated the game with a 9.0 overall. "The Iron Grip series may bring about some change in the gaming community that, for the better, will introduce a new type of game that caters, not only to the people who want to run and gun, but to those gamers who want something with a little more meat than your average first person shooter."

Destructoid gave the game a 6.0, saying that while the single-player mode was "more of a chore than any kind of fun," the multiplayer mode "is really quite solid."

== See also ==
- Iron Grip: The Oppression
- Iron Grip: Marauders
