= Davilex Games =

Dutch video game developer (1986–2005)

Davilex Software BV
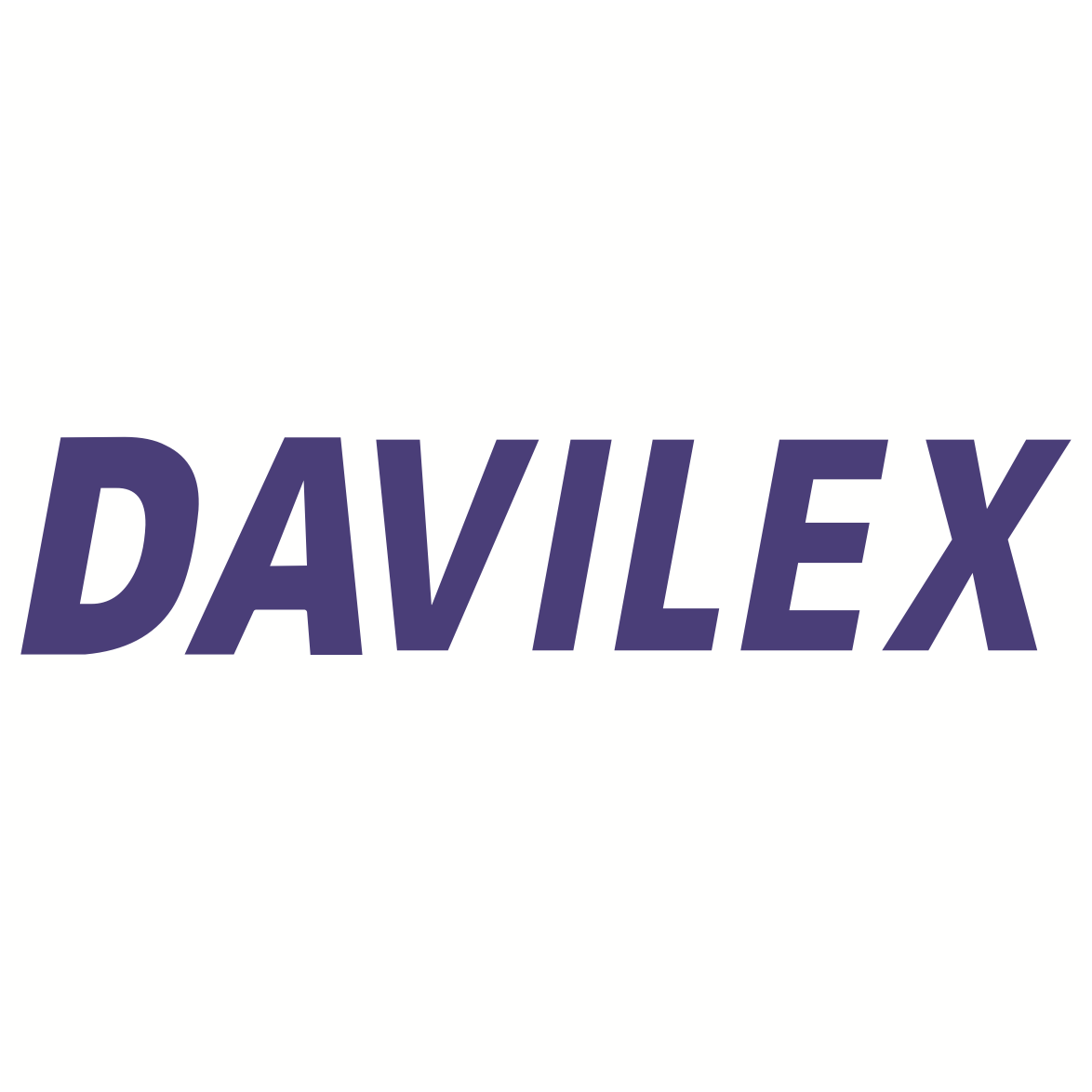
- Industry: Video games
- Founded: 1986; 40 years ago
- Defunct: 2005; 21 years ago
- Headquarters: Houten, Utrecht, Netherlands

Davilex Software BV, trading as Davilex Games, was a video game developer and publisher located in Houten, Utrecht, Netherlands. A subsidiary of Davilex International, they are most well known for their Racer franchise of Racing video games.

== History ==
Davilex Games was formed in 1986. The company initially released PC software including accounting and edutainment programs before expanding to the video game market. Their Racer series of racing games were sold as budget titles and were top-sellers in the countries where they were sold. Autobahn Raser's sales in the German market totaled 103,000 units from January through September 1998, which made it the region's sixth-best-selling computer game during that period. In February 1999, Autobahn Raser's computer version received a "Gold" award from the Verband der Unterhaltungssoftware Deutschland (VUD), indicating sales of at least 100,000 units across Germany, Austria and Switzerland. London Racer and London Racer II, released in the United Kingdom, sold over 600,000 copies in the UK.

In April 2001, the company signed a pan-European distribution deal with Infogrames for Europe Racer. This followed an existing distribution deal the two companies held for France and Belgium. A distribution deal for North America followed in November.

In May 2002, the company signed a licensing deal with Universal Studios Licensing to develop and publish games based on Knight Rider, forming Devilex's debut in the licensed game realm. The company expanded its licensing agreement with Universal to publish a game based on Miami Vice in January 2004.

In January 2003, the company announced that it would restructure to become a publisher only and close down its internal development studio.

Davilex Games ceased operations after 2005 following a string of unprofitable games and poor reception.

== Games ==
Year	Title	Developer(s)	Platform(s)	Alternate titles	Note(s)
1993	Inspecteur Banaan en de ontvoering van Mabella	Davilex Games	Microsoft Windows	Inspector Banana and the kidnapping of Mabella (English)	
1996	A2 Racer	Davilex Games	Microsoft Windows	N/A	Released only in the Netherlands
1996	RedCat: Rekenen: De Razende Rekenrace	Davilex Games	Microsoft Windows	N/A	Released only in the Netherlands
1997	RedCat Spookkasteel	Davilex Games	Microsoft Windows	N/A	Released only in the Netherlands
1998	Autobahn Raser: Ohne Regeln gnadenlos über deutsche Autobahnen	Davilex Games	Microsoft Windows	Autobahn Racer	Released in Germany, also released in the Netherlands in German after its success
1998	A2 Racer 2	Davilex Games	Microsoft Windows	N/A	Released only in the Netherlands
1999	A2 Racer III: Europa Tour	Davilex Games	Microsoft Windows	Autobahn Racer II: Mit Vollgas über Original-Strecken Deutschlands heizen! (Germany); M25 Racer (UK); London Racer (UK, re-release); Paris-Marseille Racing (France)	Same game engine but mostly different maps depending on the localization.
2000	A2 Racer III: Europa Tour	Davilex Games	PlayStation	Autobahn Racer II: Mit Vollgas über Original-Strecken Deutschlands heizen! (Germany); London Racer (UK); Paris-Marseille Racing (France)	
2000	Vakantie Racer	Davilex Games	Microsoft Windows	Urlaubs Raser (Germany); Holiday Racer (UK)	
2000	A2 Racer: De Politie Slaat Terug!	Davilex Games	Microsoft Windows	Autobahn Raser III: Die Polizei schlägt zurück! (Germany)	Released in the Netherlands and Germany
2000	Amsterdam Monster Madness	Davilex Games	Microsoft Windows	Invasion Deutschland (Germany); AmsterDoom (UK)	
2001	Europe Racing	Davilex Games	Microsoft Windows	Europa Raser (Germany); Europe Racer (UK); Euro Racer (Spain); Europe Crazy Racing (Italy)	
2001	Europe Racing	Inverse Entertainment	PlayStation	Europa Raser (Germany); Europe Racer (UK); Euro Racer (Spain); Europe Crazy Racing (Italy)	
2001	Grachten Racer	Davilex Games	Microsoft Windows	Speedboat Raser Europa (Germany); Speedboat Racer Europe (UK)	
2001	Casino Mogul	Cat Daddy Games	Microsoft Windows	Casino Tycoon (US)	Select European releases, others are published by Monte Cristo
2002	A2 Racer Goes USA!	Davilex Games	Microsoft Windows	USA Raser (Germany); USA Racer (UK); USA Racing (France); US Racer (US)	
2002	A2 Racer Goes USA!	Inverse Entertainment	PlayStation	USA Raser (Germany); USA Racer (UK); USA Racing (France); US Racer (US)	
2002	A2 Racer Goes USA!	Davilex Games	PlayStation 2	USA Raser (Germany); USA Racer (UK); USA Racing (France); US Racer (US)	
2002	Autobahn Raser IV: Mit Vollgas durch die Innenstadt	Davilex Games	Microsoft Windows	London Racer II (UK); Paris-Marseille Racing II (France)	Was not released in the Netherlands, unlike prior entries
2002	Autobahn Raser IV: Mit Vollgas durch die Innenstadt	Inverse Entertainment	PlayStation	London Racer II (UK); Paris-Marseille Racing II (France)	Was not released in the Netherlands, unlike prior entries
2002	Autobahn Raser IV: Mit Vollgas durch die Innenstadt	Davilex Games	PlayStation 2	London Racer II (UK); Paris-Marseille Racing II (France)	Was not released in the Netherlands, unlike prior entries
2002	Knight Rider: The Game	Davilex Games	Microsoft Windows	K2000: The Game (France)	
2002	Knight Rider: The Game	Davilex Games	PlayStation 2	K2000: The Game (France)	
2003	A2 Racer: World Challenge	Davilex Games	Microsoft Windows	Autobahn Raser: World Challenge (Germany); London Racer: World Challenge (UK); Paris-Marseille Racing: Edition Tour du Monde (France)	Last main entry to be released in the Netherlands
2003	A2 Racer: World Challenge	Davilex Games	PlayStation 2	Autobahn Raser: World Challenge (Germany); London Racer: World Challenge (UK); Paris-Marseille Racing: Edition Tour du Monde (France)	Last main entry to be released in the Netherlands
2003	Beach King: Stunt Racing	Davilex Games	Microsoft Windows	Beach King Stunt Raser (Germany); Beach King: Stunt Racer (UK); Bikini Beach: Stunt Racer (US)	
2003	Beach King: Stunt Racing	Davilex Games	PlayStation 2	Beach King Stunt Raser (Germany); Beach King: Stunt Racer (UK); Bikini Beach: Stunt Racer (US)	
2004	Autobahn Raser: Das Spiel zum Film	Davilex Games	PlayStation 2	N/A	Video game adaptation of the film based on the Racer series, released only in Germany
2004	Knight Rider: The Game 2	Davilex Games	Microsoft Windows	K2000: La Revanche de Kitt (France)	
2004	Knight Rider: The Game 2	Davilex Games	PlayStation 2	K2000: La Revanche de Kitt (France)	
2004	Amsterdam Taxi Madness	Team6 Game Studios	Microsoft Windows	Taxi Raser (Germany); Taxi Racer (UK)	
2004	112 Reddingshelikopter	Davilex Games	Microsoft Windows	Rettungshelicopter 112 (Germany); 112 Rescue helicopter (UK)	
2004	Miami Vice	Atomic Planet Entertainment	Microsoft Windows	N/A	
2004	Miami Vice	Atomic Planet Entertainment	PlayStation 2	N/A	
2004	Miami Vice	Atomic Planet Entertainment	Xbox	N/A	
2005	Autobahn Raser: Destruction Madness	Davilex Games	Microsoft Windows	London Racer: Destruction Madness (UK); Paris-Marseille Racing: Destruction Madness (France)	
2005	Autobahn Raser: Destruction Madness	Davilex Games	PlayStation 2	London Racer: Destruction Madness (UK); Paris-Marseille Racing: Destruction Madness (France)	
2005	Autobahn Raser: Police Madness	Davilex Games	Microsoft Windows	London Racer: Police Madness (UK); Paris-Marseille Racing: Police Madness (France)	
2005	Autobahn Raser: Police Madness	Davilex Games	PlayStation 2	London Racer: Police Madness (UK); Paris-Marseille Racing: Police Madness (France)	
2005	SAS: Anti Terror Force	Atomic Planet Entertainment	Microsoft Windows	GSG9 Anti-Terror Force (Germany); GIGN: Anti-Terror Force (France)	
2005	SAS: Anti Terror Force	Atomic Planet Entertainment	PlayStation 2	GSG9 Anti-Terror Force (Germany); GIGN: Anti-Terror Force (France)	
2005	Red Baron	Atomic Planet Entertainment	Microsoft Windows	N/A	
2005	Red Baron	Atomic Planet Entertainment	PlayStation 2	N/A	
