= Bang Attack =

2008 video game

- Developer: Engine Software
- Platform: Wii (WiiWare)
- Release: EU: December 5, 2008; NA: April 19, 2010
- Genre: Puzzle game
- Mode: Multiplayer

Bang Attack is a video game for WiiWare developed by Netherlands-based Engine Software. It was originally released in Europe on December 5, and later in North America on April 19, 2010. The game was originally released under the name Bang!, with the name later changed to Bang Attack to avoid a naming conflict with the existing card game Bang!.

== Gameplay ==
Engine Software describes the game as a casual puzzle game, and involves players clicking on groupings of three or more of the same kind of objects (such as fruit or seashells) with the Wii Remote in order to make them disappear and score points. The game also features a two-player battle mode.
