= Ibb & Obb =

2013 puzzle platform video game

ibb & obb
- Developer: Sparpweed
- Publisher: Sparpweed
- Designer: Richard Boeser
- Programmer: Maurice Sibrandi
- Artist: Tom Rutjens
- Engine: PhyreEngine
- Platforms: PlayStation 3, Linux, OS X, Windows, Nintendo Switch
- Release: PlayStation 3; 6 August 2013; Linux, OS X, Windows; 26 May 2014; Nintendo Switch; 5 March 2020
- Genre: Puzzle-platform
- Modes: Single-player, multiplayer

ibb & obb is a puzzle-platform video game developed and published by Dutch company Sparpweed Games for the PlayStation 3. It began as Richard Boeser's graduation project and debuted at IndieCade in 2008.

A port developed by Codeglue for Microsoft Windows was released in 2014, and the Nintendo Switch version was released on March 5, 2020, as Sparpweed's last release before its closure.

The green creature, ibb, and the pink creature, obb, travel through a world divided by a thin horizon line; on either side of the barrier, everything is inverted and gravity works in opposite directions. The game is focused on cooperative play and the two characters must work closely together to progress through the game.

The intentionally lowercase names of ibb and obb come from the book The Well of Lost Plots by Jasper Fforde, where two "generics" with these names must earn their capital letters by evolving as characters.

== Reception ==
Reception

Aggregate score
Aggregator	Score
Metacritic	PC: 83/100; PS3: 78/100

Review scores
Publication	Score
Game Informer	7/10
GameSpot	7/10
IGN	8.3/10
Hardcore Gamer	4/5

ibb & obb received positive reviews from critics upon release. On Metacritic, the game holds scores of 83/100 for the Windows version based on 4 reviews, and 78/100 for the PlayStation 3 version based on 16 reviews.
