= Enercities =

2011 video game

- Developer(s): Paladin Studios
- Platform(s): Browser game
- Release: 2011
- Genre(s): Simulation game

Enercities is an educational computer-game created by the Dutch game developer Paladin Studios. The project has a €1.4M budget, and is funded by the European Commission. The game runs on Facebook and on the game website.

In Enercities, the player is faced with the challenge of developing an eco-friendly city. Players place buildings on a grid to grow their city. They need to balance energy sources, cash flow, and the city's economy, wellbeing, and environment.

In 2014, KQED-FM included it in its list of "Apps That Challenge Kids to Solve Environmental Issues," noting that its free availability made it "a plug-and-play option for classrooms".
