= Fru (video game) =

2016 puzzle-platform video game

- Developer(s): Through Games
- Publisher(s): Through Games
- Platform(s): Xbox One
- Release: 13 July 2016
- Genre(s): Puzzle-platform

Fru is a puzzle-platform game developed by Through Games. Fru was released for the Xbox One console on 13 July 2016.

== Gameplay ==
Fru is a puzzle platform video game, in which players control a young girl wearing a fox mask through a 2-dimensional environment. The game makes use of the Kinect motion sensing peripheral. The player's silhouette is projected in real-time onto the scenery to manipulate and reveal hidden platforms.

== Development and release ==
Fru was developed and published by Through Games. A prototype was created as an entry for the 2014 Global Game Jam. In March 2014, Microsoft announced at GDC that Fru would be releasing on the Xbox One video game console via their ID@Xbox program. Through Games founder, Mattia Traverso, expressed disappointment at Microsoft's decision to start selling Xbox One consoles without the Kinect device, questioning whether completing the product would be financially viable. Fru was released on 13 July 2016. The game was delisted on July 1, 2022.

== Reception ==
Reception

Aggregate score
Aggregator	Score
Metacritic	84/100

Fru received generally positive reviews from critics.
