= Radarsoft =

Dutch video game developer

- Industry: Video games Educational software
- Founded: 1984
- Headquarters: Alphen aan den Rijn, Netherlands
- Key people: John Vanderaart (aka DRJ)
- Products: Endless; Hopeless; Snoopy; Zenith
- Website: http://radarsoft.nl/

Radarsoft is a Dutch software development company that published video games in the 1980s. It released its first game (3D Tic Tac Toe) in 1984 for the Commodore 64. Until 1987 Radarsoft released multiple titles for the Amiga, Atari 8-bit computers, Philips MSX, and MS-DOS. Their main focus was the Dutch market, so most games are only available in Dutch. In 1986 Radarsoft went to the American video game market, but a packaging error at a Dutch warehouse cost the studio more money than they were able to recoup.

The software company was created after John Vanderaart, Cees Kramer and Edwin Neuteboom, who had already made several games together, met law student Leonardo Jacobs. Later, the four students from Leiden worked with the cartoonist Wijo Koek. They got in touch with Maurice de Hond through Jacobs, and were commissioned to make a topography program. This program was included with the purchase of a Commodore 64 or ZX Spectrum from V&D or Dixons. While initially only released in the Netherlands, this program was later translated and published in Finland as well.

Some of Radarsoft's most successful games include the shooter Eindeloos (aka Endless or Infinitis, 1985, also released in France and England) and the platform game Hopeloos (Hopeless, 1986). The games Topografie Nederland and Tempo Typen were used in the television game show It's All in the Game. They also released a Commodore 64 platform game featuring Snoopy (1984) and Co & Co (1985). The last game Radarsoft has been credited for is Zenith (1997), a pinball game for the Philips CD-i.

Radarsoft now focuses on educational multimedia software and multimedia projects on CD-ROM, DVD and internet.

== Games ==
Year	Title	Notes
19??	Memory	
1984	3D Tic Tac Toe	
1984	Anonimus	
1984	Cursus typen	
1984	Dodge'em	
1984	Gobang	
1984	Herby	
1984	Herby Thriller	
1984	In den Beginne	
1984	Letterstress	
1984	Railroad	
1984	Rekenwonder	
1984	Seawar	
1984	Snoopy	
1984	Space Mates	
1984	Space Rendez Vous	
1984	De Steen Der Wijzen	Also known as Magic Stone of Pierre Magique (French)
1984	Tanks	
1984	Tempo Typen	Also known as Tempo Typing or Tempo Tippen
1984	Time Traveller	
1984	Topografie Europa	Also known as Maps 64 - Europe
1984	Topografie Nederland	Also known as Maps 64 - USA
1984	Topografie Wereld	Also known as Maps 64 - World
1985	Co & Co	
1985	De Grotten van Oberon	
1985	De Sekte	
1985	DRJ	
1985	Eindeloos	Also known as Endless and Infinitis
1985	Horror Hotel	
1985	Kruiswoord	Also known as Crossword
1985	Maailman	Also known as Maailman Kartta
1985	Nautilus	
1985	Supermorf	
1985	Verkeersrally	Also known as Traffix
1985	Zone VII	
1986	All Risks	
1986	The Big Deal	
1986	Floyd the Droid	
1986	Hopeloos	Also known as Hopeless
1986	De kapriolen	
1986	Nachtwacht	
1986	Topographie Deutschland	
1987	Breaker	
1987	Dynamic Publisher	
1987	RadX-8	
1987	ZOO	
1987	Zone VII: Part II	
1987	Zone VII: Part III	
1987	Zenith	
