= DarXabre =

Dutch video game developer

- Industry: Video games
- Founded: 2001; 25 years ago
- Headquarters: Netherlands
- Key people: Jason Garber
- Products: Hooligans: Storm Over Europe
- Website: http://www.darxabregames.com/

DarXabre was a Dutch video game development company led by the Dutch/Canadian Jason Garber. The company was founded in 2001 and had a sales office in Amsterdam and a development studio in Berlin. The company gained worldwide fame in 2001 with the controversial game Hooligans: Storm Over Europe, a strategy game with the objective to become the most popular group of football hooligans in Europe. Despite the controversy, much media attention and a bestseller status in the Netherlands and Belgium, the game failed to find similar success in other markets. The developer also failed to find a publisher in many regions.

In 2011 DarXabre - still led by Garber – made a brief and unsuccessful comeback as a developer of apps for the iPhone and iPad. In 2011 it released two app games for iOS: Banana Banzai (a colorful platform game) and Das Haus Anubis - Die Rache der Spinx (based on the children's series House of Anubis and developed for MTV Networks Germany).

== Controversy Hooligans: Storm Over Europe ==
The Royal Dutch Football Association (KNVB) called Hooligans: Storm Over Europe 'unacceptable' and wanted to stop the release of the game in The Netherlands. Despite the efforts of the KNVB to ban the game, distributor Artware still distributed the game in The Netherlands, however the game got an 18+ rating.

The English Football Association also wanted a ban on the game, but also that didn't happen. In England the game also got an 18+ rating by the British Board of Film Classification. Fans of the Scottish team were angry because the Tartan Army (the nickname of the Scottish fans) was portrayed as aggressive hooligans in the game. A French tabloid called Jason Garber a 'fascist' for making and promoting the game.

MicroMouse, a Japanese software developer, released the game under the shorter title Hooligans in 2002 in Japan. Because the release was planned just before the 2002 FIFA World Cup in Japan and South Korea, the game again gained some controversy in Japan. In the United States publisher Hip Interactive also published the game under the shorter title Hooligans, but that was not very successful.

== Games ==
- Hooligans: Storm Over Europe (Windows, 2001)
- Banana Banzai (iOS, 2011)
- Das Haus Anubis - Die Rache der Spinx (iOS, 2011)
