= The White Door =

2020 Dutch puzzle video game

- Developer: Rusty Lake
- Publisher: Second Maze
- Composer: Victor Butzelaar
- Series: Rusty Lake
- Platforms: Microsoft Windows, iOS, Android
- Release: January 9, 2020
- Genre: Puzzle video game
- Mode: Single-player

The White Door is a point-and-click puzzle video game developed by Dutch studio Rusty Lake. Released on Steam and iOS on January 9, 2020 and on GOG.com on April 14, 2020, it was highlighted as different from other games in Rusty Lake series, telling a more "personal" story.

== Gameplay ==
The White Door's story follows Robert Hill, who wakes up in a mental health facility in 1972, suffering from amnesia, with no memories about his life. The player needs to go through slowly changing daily routine of Robert, following a set of instructions, solving puzzles and searching for hints to find about his background and help him restore lost memory.

== Reception ==
The game has been praised for its unique monochrome style and vagueness of the narrative, uncommon for games where the main character has lost their memory, leaving some questions unanswered. The White Door was described by PC Gamer as "getting under your skin and making you feel what it's like to be somebody else" and "the game about feeling as bad as it's possible to feel", where everyone can find certain personal relevance and significance.

== See also ==
- Cube Escape
