= Virtual Fairground =

Dutch video game developer (2008–2011)

- Industry: Retail
- Founded: 2008
- Defunct: 2011
- Fate: Bankruptcy
- Headquarters: Amsterdam, Netherlands
- Products: Video game industry Interactive entertainment
- Website: www.virtualfairground.com

Virtual Fairground (2008–2011) was a Dutch video game developer from Amsterdam. In 2008 it acquired the Dutch Flash development studio Flashclub (and renamed it BigWheel Studio) to serve as main development outfit. Virtual Fairground created Club Galactik (2010), a Flash based virtual world and MMO based on an international animated television series called Galactik Football. With the game Virtual Fairground targeted a younger audience.

In 2010 the company collaborated with Dutch DJ Ferry Corsten and announced Pulse, a dance themed rhythm game for iPhone and Steam. It was promised Ferry Corsten would produce 7 new music tracks exclusively for Pulse. The final iOS version of Pulse: The Game was released in March 2010 after being completed by Dutch game developer Rough Cookie. In the same year Virtual Fairground also developed a development platform for Flash-based 3D MMO's; this engine was called The Ride.

In 2011 Virtual Fairground went bankrupt. The company had financial problems due to some cancelled projects and to a disappointing number of visitors of Club Galactik, the game version of Galactik Football.

== Games ==
- Club Galactik (online, 2010)
- Pulse: The Game (iOS, 2010, completed by developer Rough Cookie)
