= Aackosoft =

Dutch video game developer (1983–1988)

Aackosoft International B.V.
- Industry: Video games Educational software Accounting software
- Founded: 1983
- Fate: Bankruptcy in 1988
- Headquarters: Zoeterwoude / Leiden, Netherlands
- Key people: Paul van Aacken, Guurt Kok (founders)
- Products: Sprinter/The Train Game; North Sea Helicopter

Aackosoft International B.V. was a Dutch video game developer and publisher from 1983 to 1988 that exclusively developed games for the MSX home computer, becoming one of the biggest publishers for the MSX platform. It re-released some titles for the ZX Spectrum and Commodore 64, for which it also distributed software in their early years. Aackosoft filed for bankruptcy in 1988.

Aackosoft released its software under multiple labels. Besides the Aackosoft brand name, software was also released as Aackosoft Edusystems (for the educational titles), Eaglesoft (for budget titles released on cassette tapes), Eurosoft, Methodic Solutions and The ByteBusters. The latest was also the name of Aackosoft's programming team.

Many of Aackosoft's games are clones of more famous arcade games: Boom! (Galaxian), Hopper (Frogger), MacAttack (Burgertime), Oh Shit! (Pac-Man), Scentipede (Centipede), Jet Bomber (Zaxxon), Moon Rider (Moon Patrol), Space Busters (Space Invaders), Break In (Breakout), Time Curb (Time Pilot) and Robot Wars (Berzerk). Some more original games include Life in the Fast Lane, Kick It!, Drome, Skooter, North Sea Helicopter and Ultra Chess. In 1986 Aackosoft released Sprinter (a.k.a. The Train Game), featuring a 3D train simulation.

In addition to games, Aackosoft developed accounting and educational software for the MSX.
