= Rocket Riot =

2009 video game

- Developers: Codeglue; Coin-Op Interactive (Note: Worked on the Xbox 360 version.)
- Publisher: THQ (Note: iOS version published by Chillingo. Windows and Windows Phone version published by Microsoft Game Studios.)
- Programmer: Maurice Sibrandi
- Platforms: Xbox 360 (XBLA); iOS; Windows Phone 7; Microsoft Windows
- Release: Xbox 360; June 17, 2009 iOS; November 10, 2011; Windows Phone 7 October 26, 2010; Microsoft Windows; October 26, 2012
- Genre: Shooter
- Modes: Single-player, multiplayer

Rocket Riot is a downloadable video game developed by Dutch company Codeglue and Coin-Op Interactive for the Xbox 360 via Xbox Live Arcade and Windows via Windows Phone 7, Steam, and Windows 10. The title is published by THQ and was released on June 17, 2009. A version for iOS was developed by Chillingo and published on November 10, 2011. On October 19, 2016, the game released on Steam and Windows 10.

== Gameplay ==
Rocket Riot is an arena shooter in which the player controls a jetpack-powered character wielding a rocket launcher. The character can be moved in any direction using the left joystick, while the right joystick is used to aim the weapon, by choosing the angle and the power of the shot. Players move in a closed arena, where every object is destructible with rockets. This allow players to create shortcuts, hide themselves, but also sometimes release power-ups that can boost the player's attack or defense, create a silly effect (for example making the rocket launcher fires basketball balls or skulls) or be a trick power-up dangerous for the player (for example replacing the rocket launcher with a fake gun that doesn't shoot but release a small "BANG" flag).

== Development ==
The concept for Rocket Riot was created by Dutch company Coin-Op Interactive. Codeglue purchased the game concept and took on development duties, with Coin-Op providing assistance as creative director. Dutch company SonicPicnic composed all the music and made all the sound effects for the game. October 19, 2016 Codeglue re-published Rocket Riot on Steam and Windows 10 (PC and mobile).

== Reception ==
Rocket Riot has received generally positive reviews averaging over an 80% on GameRankings.

Reception

Review score
Publication	Score
IGN	8.5/10
