= Cube Escape =

Rusty Lake
- Genres: Escape Room, puzzle
- Developer: Rusty Lake
- Publisher: Rusty Lake
- Platforms: Web browser; iOS; Android; Microsoft Windows
- First release: Cube Escape: The Lake; April 25, 2015
- Latest release: Servant of the Lake; August 13, 2026

Cube Escape is a series of surrealistic escape room or point and click puzzle video games developed by Dutch indie game developers Rusty Lake. Cube Escape games largely focus on the life and death of Laura Vanderboom, who serves as the protagonist for the first two entries, Seasons and The Lake. Other games in the series feature different protagonists, such as Vincent Van Gogh, a parrot named Harvey, and a detective, Dale Vandermeer, who is investigating Laura's death.

Rusty Lake series, set in the same universe as Cube Escape, tells about the earlier events, such as the story of Eilander and Vanderboom families. Both series share similar setting and atmosphere, and are heavily inspired by Twin Peaks. As of June 2021, there have been ten mainline games released in the series, the tenth being complemented by a limited edition of the Cube Escape: Paradox comic book, illustrated by Lau Kwong Shing. In addition, Cube Escape Collection, a collection of the first nine Cube Escape games, was released on Steam in October 2020 in advance of the deprecation of Adobe Flash.

Rusty Lake series that tells about Laura Vanderboom's ancestry includes four paid games: Rusty Lake Hotel, Roots, Paradise and Servant of the Lake. In the same universe, but considered singular games, Rusty Lake has released both The White Door and Samsara Room - a remake of an older game published by Rusty Lake in 2016. Additionally added to the series on November 2, 2022 was The Past Within, which is a two-player game, the first Rusty Lake has made of this type.

== Development ==
Development on the Rusty Lake universe began in 2015. Looise and Ras had previously worked together on several flash games based on current events, which Looise reported were moderately successful but were quickly forgotten. The pair wanted to create games that would have more lasting impact. While developing the concept the two decided to set the works within a shared setting where "anything could happen" and chose the name Rusty Lake, as they wanted a "mysterious name" for both the setting and for their studio, which would share the same name. The name was influenced by David Lynch's Twin Peaks, which the developers saw as an influence along with point-and-click adventure games such as Myst and Monkey Island as influences.

The studio released the first official game in the Rusty Lake universe, Cube Escape: The Lake, in 2015. As Looise and Ras had not developed enough of a fanbase to ensure the success of The Lake, the two chose to release it as a free game as they were worried that it would be overshadowed by other paid games. The game was received favourably and three more Cube Escape games were released that same year. Later, the duo released Rusty Lake Hotel, the first of four games in the main Rusty Lake series, along with Roots and Paradise, all intended to be playable without experiencing any of the other games in the series while still expanding the overall universe. In 2018, Cube Escape: Paradox was released, alongside with a short film, bearing the same name; both game and film are telling the story of a detective Dale Vandermeer, mysteriously stuck in his memories and locked inside the territory of the Rusty Lake.

A painting created by a Dutch artist Johan Scherft specifically for the Paradox short film, dedicated to the 2018 release of Cube Escape: Paradox

A remake of an earlier game, Samsara Room, was released in 2020. While the initial version was not explicitly created as part of the Rusty Lake series, the remake included changes to include it. As of 2025 there are currently 19 published games in the Rusty Lake shared universe, 11 of which are Cube Escape games. In 2025 a short film, The Intern, was released to coincide with the 2025 release of The Mr. Rabbit Magic Show. A 20th entry in the game universe, as well as 4th official game of the Rusty Lake series, Servant of the Lake, was released on August 13, 2026.

== Premise ==
Games in the Cube Escape series examines the mysteries of Rusty Lake, the life and family history of Laura Vanderboom, and their impact on one another. As players explore the games they learn of the existence of anthropomorphic godlike beings and corrupted souls, as well as various types of memory cubes, each of which serves a different purpose. Entries in the series follow multiple protagonists; Laura serves as the protagonist for the first two entries while subsequent entries follow Vincent Van Gogh, her parrot Harvey, Detective Dale Vandermeer, and the anthropomorphic Mr. Crow.

Rusty Lake series tells about the earlier events before Cube Escape, explaining the identity of Laura and deepening the understanding of the events and the magical mechanisms behind the series. Rusty Lake: Roots and its prequel Servant of the Lake are focused on the story of the Vanderboom family and its ancestor Mr. Crow; Paradise and Hotel are focused on the neighbouring family of Eilander, as well as the identity of Mr. Owl - one of its members. Most games of the series involve supernatural events such as reincarnation and collection of memory cubes, bearing some similarities with religious motifs of Buddhism and Christianity.

== Gameplay ==
All games of the Rusty Lake and Cube Escape series revolve around solving point and click puzzles, navigating different 2D environments with different interior and collecting and storing certain items in the inventory slots to use them later. Sometimes games might include dialogues and cutscenes, as well as secret endings beside the main ones.

== Cube Escape games ==
Release year	Title	Protagonist
2015	Cube Escape: Seasons	Laura Vanderboom
2015	Cube Escape: The Lake	Laura Vanderboom
2015	Cube Escape: Arles	Vincent Van Gogh
2015	Cube Escape: Harvey's Box	Harvey
2015	Cube Escape: Case 23	Detective Dale Vandermeer
2015	Cube Escape: The Mill	Mr. Crow
2016	Cube Escape: Birthday	Detective Dale Vandermeer
2016	Cube Escape: Theatre	Detective Dale Vandermeer
2017	Cube Escape: The Cave	Mr. Crow
2018	Cube Escape: Paradox	Detective Dale Vandermeer
2020	Cube Escape Collection (a re-release of the first 9 games)	Collection

== Other Rusty Lake games ==
Release year	Title	Metacritic
2015	Rusty Lake Hotel	65/100
2016	Rusty Lake: Roots	75/100
2018	Rusty Lake Paradise	
2020	The White Door	77/100
2020	Samsara Room (Note: Originally released in 2013 before the official launch of the Rusty Lake studio.)	
2022	The Past Within	68/100
2023	Underground Blossom	
2024	Rusty Lake Untold: The Lab (Note: Pre-written printable roleplay game. No online version.)	
2025	The Mr. Rabbit Magic Show	
2026	Servant Of The Lake	

== Notes ==
=== Rusty Lake Hotel ===
In 2015 Rusty Lake released Rusty Lake Hotel, a puzzle video game. Players take the role of Harvey, an anthropomorphic parrot, at a hotel on a lake island, hosting five guests, each of whom is a humanoid animal invited to experience gourmet meals. Each night the player will visit a guest's room, where they cannot leave until they have solved multiple puzzles and killed the guest, who will then be cooked and served to the remaining guests as a dish on the following day.

The game was released to Android and iOS systems on December 14, 2015, followed by a release to macOS and Windows on January 29 of the following year. Rusty Lake Hotel received mixed reviews on Metacritic. Common elements of praise centred upon the game's artwork and atmosphere, which Rock Paper Shotgun's reviewer cited as a highlight despite their personal dislike of puzzle games. Elements of criticism focused on the user interface for the mobile version; Adventure Gamers also voiced concern over the game's puzzle logic and story, stating that the game might only appeal to fans of Cube Escape.

Five guests arriving at the Hotel in beginning of the Rusty Lake Hotel

=== Rusty Lake: Roots ===
Rusty Lake: Roots is a puzzle game and marked the second standalone game released in the Rusty Lake series and shared universe. The game focuses on three generations of the Vanderboom family in the late 19th and early 20th centuries. Players are tasked with solving puzzles over 33 individual vignettes and ensure the continued growth of the Vanderboom family tree.

The game was released to Android, Microsoft Windows, iOS, and macOS on October 20, 2016. It received generally favourable reviews on Metacritic. Reviewers for Rock Paper Shotgun and PC World both praised the game for expanding upon the Rusty Lake universe; the reviewer for Rock Paper Shotgun noted that the game was accessible to players new to Rusty Lake while also expanding the lore for those familiar with the other entries. Both reviewers had critical notes; PC World's reviewer criticised that the game was "clearly built for tablets, not PC" while Rock Paper Shotgun commented that the game lacked the "intense creepiness that defines the Rusty Lake oeuvre". Pocket Gamer gave the game a Silver Award in their review, calling it "A weird and dark adventure that's well worth exploring".

The landscape of the Rusty Lake area, shown in the Rusty Lake: Roots

=== Rusty Lake Paradise ===
Rusty Lake Paradise is a puzzle game that was released on January 11, 2018. The game is set on a small, isolated island in Rusty Lake, where the island and its inhabitants have been cursed with the biblical ten plagues of Egypt. Gameplay takes place in 1796 and centres upon the return of Jakob Eilander, who has returned home after learning of his mother's death. Once there, Jakob is tasked by his mother's ghost to retrieve her memories and bring an end to the plagues.

As with prior games, Rusty Lake Paradise was released to Android, Microsoft Windows, iOS, and macOS. Reviewers of the game praised its for its surreal horror and expansion upon the Rusty Lake lore. The reviewer for PC World praised the game while noting that the game needed better balance for the puzzle difficulty and that it had "quite a few filler puzzles".

=== The White Door ===
The White Door is a puzzle video game that centres upon the character of Robert Hill, a character last seen in Cube Escape: Theatre. In this game Hill awakens in a mental institution with amnesia and the inability to see any colours other than shades of black and white, all of which the facility's staff promises they can restore. As the game progresses, players must follow instructions and solve puzzles in order to understand Hill's background and restore his memory. Players are given two windows through which they view Hill's world: one featuring a top-down perspective during the daytime and other perspectives while Hill is asleep, as well as another window that shows close-ups of what Hill is viewing.

Initially intended for a 2019 release, the game's release was pushed to January 9, 2020, with the developers stating that the additional time was needed for their personal well-being and that it would be better for the game's quality. The developers also imparted that the game would feature changes to the gameplay and puzzle mechanics and would be "the most narrative based game we made so far". They also chose to release the game under a new label of theirs, Second Maze, due to the game's divergence from their usual style.

Shortly after the game's release the developers began an ARG based on The White Door, where players could visit the mental health facility's website and social media accounts to reveal additional puzzles and secrets that would reveal codes that could be used to access an alternative third ending for the game. Hardcore Gaming 101 reported that fans of the series had begun playing the ARG before it was launched and accessing the final area prior to the developers adding necessary content, causing Rusty Lake to compliment the players and change elements of the ARG in order to keep it challenging upon launch.

The game released on Android, Microsoft Windows, iOS, and macOS and received generally favorable reviews on Metacritic. The reviewer for PC Gamer found the subject matter "much more challenging than the puzzles" and that the game is ultimately about "feeling as bad as it's possible to feel" while also "a game about feeling better, and enduring life's colour-drained, joyless passages, emerging from the other side, and finding beauty in the smallest, simplest things." A reviewer for The Stanford Daily commented that they were disappointed by the game, as they were expecting it to be more similar to the prior games. The developers responded to reviews expressing disappointment, thanking people for their feedback while reiterating that they had wanted to make something different from their usual style.

=== Samsara Room ===
An early version of Samsara Room was released in 2013, prior to the developers' publication of the first Cube Escape game. Gameplay is similar to others in the Rusty Lake series; players must explore and escape a single-location. A remake of the game was released in 2020 to coincide with the fifth birthday of the Rusty Lake series. Changes made to the game include additions to tie the game more closely into the Rusty Lake universe, as well as new puzzles, graphics, and soundtrack.

=== The Past Within ===
The Past Within was released on November 2, 2022 to Android, iOS, macOS, and Windows. A Nintendo Switch version was released in 2023. The game marks the first two-player game in the Rusty Lake series. Players must cooperate to solve problems and as each are in different points in time, neither can see or interact with the other's puzzles. As with prior entries in the Rusty Lake series that dealt with time, changes and clues in one time period can impact the person playing in the other. The game does not require an internet connection.

The game's story revolves around solving the mystery of Albert Vanderboom by communicating between the past and future, and fulfilling his legacy. The Past Within received mixed reviews on Metacritic and was nominated for best innovation and best game design at the 2023 Dutch Game Awards. Common elements of praise centred upon the gameplay mechanics and storyline, while Will Quick of Pocket Gamer questioned its replay value.

=== Underground Blossom ===
Underground Blossom is a 2023-point and click game. Released on September 27, 2023, the game focuses on several key moments in the life of Laura Vanderboom, which are being viewed by Harvey the parrot. Players must solve puzzles and make their way through an underground metro track where each station represents a key moment in Laura's life. Prior its release Rusty Lake released a 15-20 minute demo, Underground Blossom Lite, that allowed players to explore the first two stations of the full game.

A reviewer for Pocket Gamer praised the entry's art, puzzles, and story, noting that newcomers could play the entry without needing to complete the prior Rusty Lake games first.

=== The Mr. Rabbit Magic Show ===
The Mr. Rabbit Magic Show was released on April 30, 2025 to celebrate the developer’s 10th anniversary. It features Mr. Rabbit, a character first introduced in Rusty Lake Hotel and subsequently seen in the Cube Escape games Birthday and The Cave. Players are tasked with completing puzzles and assisting Mr. Rabbit with his magical acts, but the events of the game are completely independent from the story of Rusty Lake.

=== Servant of the Lake ===
Servant of the Lake is a point-and-click puzzle video game, the fourth and currently the last game in the Rusty Lake series, released on August 13, 2026 for PC, Android, MacOS and iOS. It takes place in Spring 1839, serving as a prequel for Rusty Lake: Roots, telling the story of the Vanderboom siblings and their estate, where the player takes a role of a servant, performing tasks with various difficulty, ranging from everyday laundry or cooking to searching for "dark alchemical secrets". The game was welcomed especially warmly and praised for its dark, weird and mysterious atmosphere, typical for the Rusty Lake games.

== Reception ==
Critical reception for games in the Rusty Lake series has been mixed to favourable. Review aggregate Metacritic shows generally favourable reviews for Rusty Lake: Roots and The White Door, while Rusty Lake Hotel and The Past Within both have mixed or average reviews.

Multiple outlets have commented upon the series' mythos, with some stating that players will need to experience all of the available games in order to better understand the larger storyline of the Rusty Lake universe. Common elements of praise for the series centres upon its artwork and atmosphere, which has received praise from outlets such as Rock Paper Shotgun, Pocket Gamer, and PC World, the last of which felt that the series as of Rusty Lake Paradise was "unparalleled as far as surreal horror goes". Common elements of criticism have focused on the user interfaces for some entries in the series, as reviewers noted that the interface for Rusty Lake Hotel would pose issues for mobile users while others noted the opposite for Rusty Lake: Roots. The series' puzzles have received both positive and negative reception, as reviewers have praised the variety of puzzles while remarking that some puzzles are filler. Multiple reviews have mentioned Lynch's influence on the series; a reviewer for Kotaku felt that the series' overuse of this is a weakness, but that over time the series has "established so many of its own distinctive themes that crop up throughout, giving that sense of timelessness to a collection of games that can be set a hundred years apart."

The developers have commented upon the series' fan following, stating that they have occasionally used the community's fandom pages to look up information about the Rusty Lake series. They have also complimented the players on their puzzle savvy after the community discovered and began playing the ARG based on The White Door prior to its launch.
