= List of Wii U games =

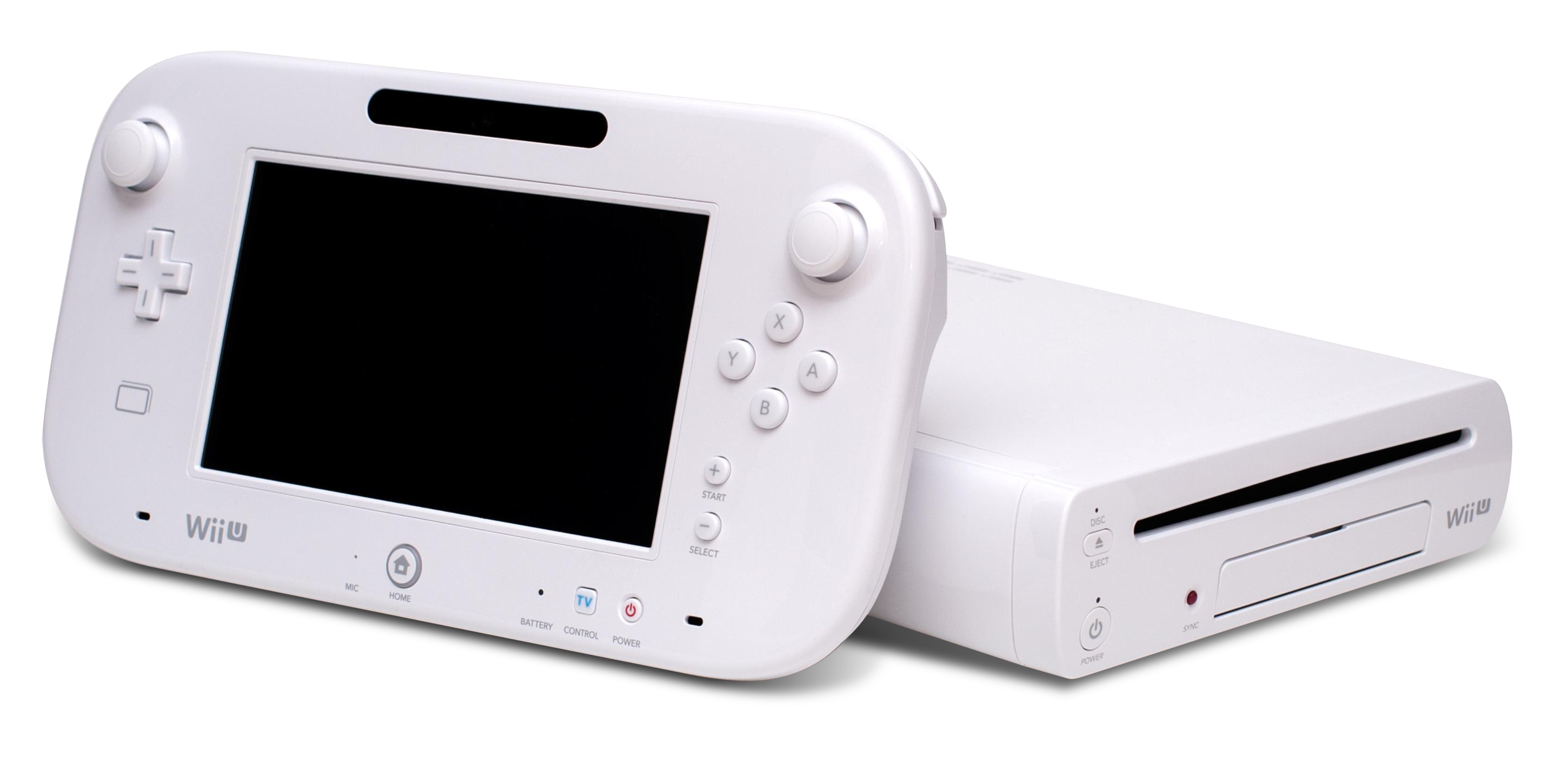
The Wii U and GamePad

Wii U retail game case cover banners

The banner used on Wii U game covers

The banner used for Japanese releases rated by CERO as C or higher, featuring a dark gradient

The Wii U is Nintendo's sixth home video game console. It is the successor to the Wii.

== Games ==
There are 792 (Note: This number is always up to date by this script.) games on this list, 209 of which were released physically on a disc.

The last first-party game to release for the Wii U is The Legend of Zelda: Breath of the Wild, which released on March 3, 2017. The last third-party games to release for the Wii U are Silver Falls: Undertakers and Silver Falls: White Inside Its Umbra, which both released exclusively in North America on the Nintendo eShop on February 16, 2023.

The list is sorted by game titles, their developer(s), publisher(s), released for and release date by Japanese, North American, Australasian, and European respectively. The game title without a region abbreviation in superior letters is a North American title, it may be shared in another region if there is no secondary title with matching region in superior letters.

For a chronological list, click the sort button in any of the available region's columns. Games dated December 8, 2012 (Japan), November 18, 2012 (North America), and November 30, 2012 (Europe and Australasia) are launch titles for the specified regions.

For a list of games that were announced or in development for the Wii U but never released, see the list of cancelled Wii U games.

Games that were released physically are marked with a dagger (†).

List of Wii U games
Title	Developer(s)	Publisher(s)	Release date				Ref.
Title	Developer(s)	Publisher(s)	Japan	North America	Australasia	Europe	Ref.
007 Legends †	Eurocom	Activision	Unreleased	December 11, 2012	Unreleased	December 7, 2012	
1001 Spikes	8bits Fanatics; Nicalis	Nicalis	November 25, 2015	June 3, 2014	Unreleased	October 1, 2015	
140	Jeppe Carlsen; Abstraction Games	Double Fine Productions	Unreleased	September 1, 2016	September 8, 2016	September 1, 2016	
153 Hand Video Poker	Skunk Software	Skunk Software	Unreleased	June 2, 2016	Unreleased	Unreleased	
360 Breakout	nuGame	nuGame	Unreleased	August 11, 2016	Unreleased	August 11, 2016	
3Souls	Red Column	Red Column	Unreleased	July 28, 2016	July 28, 2016	July 28, 2016	
6-Hand Video Poker	Skunk Software	Skunk Software	Unreleased	March 31, 2016	Unreleased	Unreleased	
6180 the moon	Turtle Cream; PokPoong Games	Turtle Cream	July 6, 2016	February 25, 2016	February 26, 2016	February 25, 2016	
8Bit Hero	Sean Garland	Righteous Weasel	Unreleased	May 12, 2016	Unreleased	Unreleased	
99Moves	EnjoyUp Games	EnjoyUp Games	October 21, 2015	December 18, 2014	Unreleased	December 18, 2014	
99Seconds	EnjoyUp Games	EnjoyUp Games	June 3, 2015	October 2, 2014	Unreleased	October 2, 2014	
Absolutely Unstoppable MineRun	Shy Egg	Shy Egg	Unreleased	April 27, 2017	April 13, 2017	April 13, 2017	
Abyss	EnjoyUp Games	EnjoyUp Games	January 7, 2015	May 1, 2014	Unreleased	May 8, 2014	
A.C.E.: Alien Cleanup Elite	Matthew Flewelling	Nitrolic Games	Unreleased	March 16, 2017	March 17, 2017	March 16, 2017	
Ace of Seafood	Nussoft	Nussoft	November 30, 2016	Unreleased	Unreleased	Unreleased	
Act It Out! A Game of Charades	Snap Finger Click	Snap Finger Click	Unreleased	October 10, 2016	October 7, 2016	October 6, 2016	
Adventure Party: Cats and Caverns	E-Regular Games	E-Regular Games	Unreleased	August 18, 2016	Unreleased	Unreleased	
Adventure Time: Explore the Dungeon Because I Don't Know! †	WayForward Technologies	NA: D3 Publisher; PAL: Namco Bandai Games	Unreleased	November 19, 2013	December 12, 2013	December 13, 2013	
Adventure Time: Finn & Jake Investigations †	Vicious Cycle Software	Little Orbit	Unreleased	October 20, 2015	Unreleased	November 6, 2015	
Adventures of Pip	Tic Toc Games	Tic Toc Games	Unreleased	June 4, 2015	Unreleased	January 21, 2016	
Aenigma Os	Akies Games	Akies Games	Unreleased	September 15, 2016	September 15, 2016	September 15, 2016	
Affordable Space Adventures	NapNok Games; Nifflas' Games	NapNok Games	November 18, 2015	April 9, 2015	April 9, 2015	April 9, 2015	
Alice in Wonderland	Brave Rock Games	Brave Rock Games	Unreleased	September 1, 2016	September 8, 2016	September 8, 2016	
Alphadia Genesis	Kemco	Natsume Inc.	April 2, 2014	November 20, 2014	February 6, 2015	February 5, 2015	
The Amazing Spider-Man: Ultimate Edition †	Beenox	Activision	Unreleased	March 5, 2013	Unreleased	March 8, 2013	
The Amazing Spider-Man 2 †	Beenox	Activision	Unreleased	April 29, 2014	May 7, 2014	May 2, 2014	
Angry Birds Star Wars †	Exient Entertainment	Activision	Unreleased	October 29, 2013	Unreleased	October 29, 2013	
Angry Birds Trilogy †	Fun Labs	Activision	Unreleased	August 13, 2013	Unreleased	August 16, 2013	
Angry Bunnies: Colossal Carrot Crusade	Cypronia	Cypronia	Unreleased	September 25, 2014	Unreleased	September 25, 2014	
Angry Video Game Nerd Adventures	FreakZone	ScrewAttack Games	Unreleased	April 2, 2015	Unreleased	December 10, 2015	
Animal Crossing: Amiibo Festival †	Nintendo EPD; NDcube	Nintendo	November 21, 2015	November 13, 2015	November 21, 2015	November 20, 2015	
Animal Gods	Still Games	Still Games	Unreleased	April 6, 2017	Unreleased	Unreleased	
Annihilation	TreeFall Studios	TreeFall Studios	Unreleased	August 31, 2017	November 10, 2017	November 9, 2017	
Another World: 20th Anniversary Edition	Delphine Software International	The Digital Lounge	January 21, 2015	June 19, 2014	June 19, 2014	June 19, 2014	
Aperion Cyberstorm	aPriori Digital	aPriori Digital	Unreleased	February 8, 2018	February 9, 2018	February 8, 2018	
Aqua Moto Racing Utopia	Zordix	Zordix	Unreleased	April 19, 2018	April 19, 2018	April 19, 2018	
Aqua TV	Extra Miles Studio	Extra Miles Studio	Unreleased	March 23, 2017	November 17, 2016	November 17, 2016	
Arc Style: Baseball! SP	Arc System Works	Arc System Works	September 18, 2013	Unreleased	Unreleased	Unreleased	
Archery by Thornbury Software	Thornbury Software	Thornbury Software	Unreleased	September 29, 2016	Unreleased	Unreleased	
Ark Rush	Nintendo	Nintendo	June 24, 2015	Unreleased	Unreleased	Unreleased	
Armikrog	Pencil Test Studios	Versus Evil	Unreleased	August 23, 2016	August 23, 2016	August 23, 2016	
Armillo	Fuzzy Wuzzy Games	Fuzzy Wuzzy Games	October 29, 2014	July 3, 2014	Unreleased	July 3, 2014	
Armored ACORNs: Action Squirrel Squad	Nexcra Software	Nexcra Software	Unreleased	March 23, 2017	June 1, 2017	June 1, 2017	
Arrow Time U	XenoHorizon	XenoHorizon	Unreleased	September 18, 2014	Unreleased	Unreleased	
Art Academy: Home Studio^{NA} Art Academy: Atelier^{PAL} †	Headstrong Games	Nintendo	November 12, 2015	June 25, 2015	July 4, 2015	June 26, 2015	
Art of Balance	Shin'en Multimedia	Shin'en Multimedia	October 29, 2014	October 9, 2014	December 18, 2014	September 25, 2014	
Ascent of Kings	Nostatic Software	Nostatic Software	Unreleased	October 22, 2015	December 18, 2015	December 17, 2015	
Asdivine Hearts	Kemco	Kemco	January 13, 2016	April 14, 2016	April 7, 2016	April 7, 2016	
Assassin's Creed III †	Ubisoft Montreal	Ubisoft	December 8, 2012	November 18, 2012	November 30, 2012	November 30, 2012	
Assassin's Creed IV: Black Flag †	Ubisoft Montreal	Ubisoft	November 28, 2013	October 29, 2013	November 21, 2013	November 22, 2013	
Asteroid Quarry	Hero Work Games	Hero Work Games	Unreleased	July 9, 2015	Unreleased	Unreleased	
Astral Breakers	Intropy Games	Intropy Games	March 23, 2016	August 6, 2015	Unreleased	Unreleased	
Ava and Avior Save the Earth	2020 Venture	2020 Venture	Unreleased	April 24, 2014	Unreleased	Unreleased	
Avoider	RCMADIAX	RCMADIAX	Unreleased	January 7, 2016	Unreleased	Unreleased	
Axiom Verge †	Tom Happ Games	Tom Happ Games	Unreleased	September 1, 2016	September 1, 2016	September 1, 2016	
Azure Snake	RandomSpin	RandomSpin	Unreleased	January 24, 2019	January 11, 2019	January 10, 2019	
B3 Game Expo for Bees	Famous Gamous	Famous Gamous	Unreleased	June 2, 2016	June 9, 2016	June 9, 2016	
Back to Bed	Bedtime Digital Games	Bedtime Digital Games	March 29, 2017	February 16, 2017	December 23, 2016	December 22, 2016	
Badland: Game of the Year Edition	Frogmind	Frogmind	Unreleased	July 30, 2015	July 30, 2015	July 30, 2015	
Baila Latino †	O2 Games	O2 Games	Unreleased	May 28, 2015	Unreleased	May 21, 2015	
Ballpoint Universe: Infinite	Arachnid Games	JP: Unity Games; NA: Arachnid Games	October 15, 2014	October 16, 2014	Unreleased	Unreleased	
Barbie and Her Sisters: Puppy Rescue †	Torus Games	Little Orbit	Unreleased	November 3, 2015	Unreleased	November 19, 2015	
Barbie Dreamhouse Party †	Torus Games	Little Orbit	Unreleased	November 19, 2013	Unreleased	November 22, 2013	
Batman: Arkham City – Armored Edition †	WB Games Montréal	Warner Bros. Interactive Entertainment	December 8, 2012	November 18, 2012	November 30, 2012	November 30, 2012	
Batman: Arkham Origins †	WB Games Montréal	Warner Bros. Interactive Entertainment	October 25, 2013	October 25, 2013	November 6, 2013	November 8, 2013	
Batman: Arkham Origins Blackgate – Deluxe Edition	Armature Studio	Warner Bros. Interactive Entertainment	Unreleased	April 1, 2014	April 10, 2014	April 10, 2014	
Bayonetta †	Bee Tribe	Nintendo	September 20, 2014	October 24, 2014	October 25, 2014	October 24, 2014	
Bayonetta 2 †	PlatinumGames	Nintendo	September 20, 2014	October 24, 2014	October 25, 2014	October 24, 2014	
Beatbuddy: Tale of the Guardians	Threaks	Threaks	Unreleased	September 24, 2015	Unreleased	August 5, 2015	
The Beggar's Ride	Bad Seed	Bad Seed	Unreleased	May 5, 2016	April 1, 2016	March 31, 2016	
Ben 10: Omniverse †	Vicious Cycle Software	NA: D3 Publisher; PAL: Namco Bandai Games	Unreleased	November 18, 2012	November 30, 2012	November 30, 2012	
Ben 10: Omniverse 2 †	High Voltage Software	NA: D3 Publisher; PAL: Namco Bandai Games	Unreleased	November 5, 2013	November 28, 2013	November 22, 2013	
Bigley's Revenge	Ninja Pig Studios	Ninja Pig Studios	Unreleased	January 7, 2016	Unreleased	Unreleased	
Bike Rider UltraDX - World Tour	Spicysoft	Spicysoft	August 5, 2015	Unreleased	November 6, 2015	November 5, 2015	
The Binding of Isaac: Rebirth	Nicalis	Nicalis	October 28, 2015	July 23, 2015	Unreleased	October 29, 2015	
Bird Mania Party	Teyon	Teyon	February 17, 2016	March 17, 2016	Unreleased	March 10, 2016	
Bit Dungeon Plus	KintoGames	KintoGames	December 20, 2017	October 13, 2016	July 14, 2016	July 5, 2016	
Blackjack 21	Skunk Software	Skunk Software	Unreleased	June 23, 2016	Unreleased	Unreleased	
Blasting Agent: Ultimate Edition	Super Icon	Super Icon	Unreleased	August 18, 2016	August 18, 2016	August 18, 2016	
Blek	Kunabi Brother	Kunabi Brother	Unreleased	February 12, 2015	Unreleased	February 12, 2015	
Bloc	Calvin Tham; Perry Berkum	Cragworks	Unreleased	July 28, 2016	June 29, 2017	June 29, 2017	
Blockara	Haunted Bees Productions; Sean Finch	Haunted Bees Productions	Unreleased	April 21, 2016	Unreleased	Unreleased	
Block Zombies!	Nostatic Software	Nostatic Software	Unreleased	May 25, 2017	June 8, 2017	June 8, 2017	
Blocky Bot	Mobot Studios	Mobot Studios	Unreleased	May 21, 2015	Unreleased	July 23, 2015	
Blok Drop U	RCMADIAX	RCMADIAX	June 29, 2016	March 6, 2014	Unreleased	June 26, 2014	
Blok Drop X: Twisted Fusion	RCMADIAX	RCMADIAX	Unreleased	December 18, 2014	Unreleased	March 5, 2015	
Blue-Collar Astronaut	Mutated Software	Mutated Software	Unreleased	March 14, 2017	Unreleased	Unreleased	
Bombing Bastards	Sanuk Games	Sanuk Games	Unreleased	July 3, 2014	Unreleased	July 31, 2014	
The Book of Unwritten Tales 2 †	King Art Games	Nordic Games	Unreleased	June 7, 2016	June 7, 2016	June 7, 2016	
Booty Diver	Xavier Orion Games	Xavier Orion Games	Unreleased	April 20, 2017	Unreleased	Unreleased	
Box Up	RCMADIAX	RCMADIAX	Unreleased	July 13, 2017	July 20, 2017	July 20, 2017	
Brave Tank Hero	Arc System Works	JP: Arc System Works; WW: Natsume Inc.	July 30, 2014	August 27, 2015	September 24, 2015	September 24, 2015	
Breakout Defense	nuGame	nuGame	Unreleased	December 15, 2016	Unreleased	December 15, 2016	
Breakout Defense 2	nuGame	nuGame	Unreleased	November 23, 2017	Unreleased	January 11, 2018	
Breezeblox	Pugsley	Pugsley	Unreleased	January 22, 2015	Unreleased	Unreleased	
BrickBlast U!	Nexis Games	Nexis Games	Unreleased	June 26, 2014	Unreleased	Unreleased	
Brick Breaker	Sanuk Games	Sanuk Games	Unreleased	September 15, 2016	September 15, 2016	September 15, 2016	
Brick Race	RCMADIAX	RCMADIAX	Unreleased	February 9, 2017	February 3, 2017	February 2, 2017	
The Bridge	The Quantum Astrophysicists Guild	The Quantum Astrophysicists Guild	Unreleased	August 20, 2015	August 20, 2015	August 20, 2015	
Bridge Constructor Playground	Joindots	Joindots	Unreleased	December 8, 2016	December 9, 2016	December 8, 2016	
Brunswick Pro Bowling †	Alliance Digital Media	Alliance Digital Media	Unreleased	January 21, 2016	Unreleased	Unreleased	
Bubble Gum Popper	Skunk Software	Skunk Software	Unreleased	April 2, 2015	Unreleased	Unreleased	
Buddy & Me: Dream Edition	Sunbreak Games	Sunbreak Games	Unreleased	July 21, 2016	July 21, 2016	July 21, 2016	
Buta Medal	Nintendo	Nintendo	July 22, 2014	Unreleased	Unreleased	Unreleased	
Cabela's Big Game Hunter: Pro Hunts †	Cauldron	Activision	Unreleased	March 25, 2014	Unreleased	Unreleased	
Cabela's Dangerous Hunts 2013 †	Cauldron	Activision	Unreleased	December 4, 2012	Unreleased	December 4, 2012	
Cake Ninja 3: The Legend Continues	Cypronia	Cypronia	Unreleased	December 18, 2014	Unreleased	December 4, 2014	
Call of Duty: Black Ops II †	Treyarch	WW: Activision; JP: Square Enix	December 20, 2012	November 18, 2012	November 30, 2012	November 30, 2012	
Call of Duty: Ghosts †	Treyarch	WW: Activision; JP: Square Enix	November 14, 2013	November 5, 2013	November 5, 2013	November 5, 2013	
Call of Nightmare	Nightmare Games	RandomSpin	Unreleased	December 6, 2018	Unreleased	Unreleased	
Candy Hoarder	Nitrolic Games	Nitrolic Games	Unreleased	March 9, 2017	March 10, 2017	March 9, 2017	
Canvaleon	OXiAB Game Studio	OXiAB Game Studio	Unreleased	July 23, 2015	Unreleased	July 23, 2015	
Captain Toad: Treasure Tracker †	Nintendo EAD Tokyo; 1-Up Studio	Nintendo	November 13, 2014	December 5, 2014	January 3, 2015	January 2, 2015	
Captain U	Ultra Dolphin Revolution	Ultra Dolphin Revolution	Unreleased	December 23, 2021	December 10, 2021	December 23, 2021	
Cars 3: Driven to Win †	Avalanche Software	Warner Bros. Interactive Entertainment	Unreleased	June 13, 2017	June 14, 2017	July 14, 2017	
CastleStorm	Zen Studios	Zen Studios	Unreleased	December 26, 2013	December 27, 2013	December 26, 2013	
The Cave	Double Fine Productions	Sega	August 28, 2013	January 22, 2013	January 24, 2013	January 24, 2013	
Chariot	Frima Studio	Frima Studio	March 25, 2015	January 8, 2015	January 9, 2015	January 8, 2015	
Chasing Aurora	Broken Rules	Broken Rules	Unreleased	November 18, 2012	November 30, 2012	November 30, 2012	
Chasing Dead	2020 Venture	2020 Venture	Unreleased	March 3, 2016	March 4, 2016	March 3, 2016	
Chests o' Booty	Wildmane Studios	Wildmane Studios	Unreleased	October 16, 2014	Unreleased	Unreleased	
Child of Light	Ubisoft Montreal	Ubisoft	April 30, 2014	April 30, 2014	April 30, 2014	April 30, 2014	
Chimpuzzle Pro	CW-Games	CW-Games	Unreleased	Unreleased	Unreleased	September 18, 2014	
Chompy Chomp Chomp Party	Utopian World of Sandwiches	Utopian World of Sandwiches	Unreleased	May 19, 2016	April 1, 2016	March 31, 2016	
Christmas Adventure of Rocket Penguin	Petite Games	Petite Games	Unreleased	November 5, 2015	Unreleased	Unreleased	
Chroma Blast	WizByte Games	WizByte Games	Unreleased	July 14, 2016	Unreleased	Unreleased	
Chronicles of Teddy: Harmony of Exidus †	Storybird Games	Aksys Games	February 14, 2018	March 31, 2016	April 7, 2016	April 8, 2016	
Chubbins	Dahku Creations	Dahku Creations	Unreleased	June 5, 2014	Unreleased	Unreleased	
Citadale: Gate of Souls	Nitrolic Games	Nitrolic Games	Unreleased	November 24, 2016	August 18, 2016	August 18, 2016	
Citadale: The Legends Trilogy	Nitrolic Games	Nitrolic Games	Unreleased	May 4, 2017	May 5, 2017	May 4, 2017	
Citizens of Earth	Eden Industries	Atlus	Unreleased	January 22, 2015	January 23, 2015	January 23, 2015	
Cloudberry Kingdom	Pwnee Studios	Ubisoft	March 26, 2014	August 1, 2013	August 1, 2013	August 1, 2013	
Coaster Crazy Deluxe	Frontier Developments	Frontier Developments	Unreleased	November 21, 2013	Unreleased	November 21, 2013	
Cocoto Magic Circus 2 †	Neko Entertainment	WW: Bigben Interactive; JP: Rainy Frog	July 2, 2014	January 9, 2014	December 27, 2013	December 26, 2013	
Collateral Thinking	Astrosaurus Games	Astrosaurus Games	Unreleased	August 18, 2016	August 18, 2016	August 18, 2016	
Color Bombs	RCMADIAX	RCMADIAX	Unreleased	October 22, 2015	April 14, 2016	April 14, 2016	
Color Cubes	RCMADIAX	RCMADIAX	Unreleased	February 16, 2017	February 3, 2017	February 2, 2017	
Color Symphony 2	Remimory	Remimory	Unreleased	May 12, 2016	May 12, 2016	May 12, 2016	
Color Zen	Cypronia	Cypronia	Unreleased	May 15, 2014	Unreleased	May 22, 2014	
Color Zen Kids	Cypronia	Cypronia	Unreleased	June 19, 2014	Unreleased	June 19, 2014	
Commander Keen in Keen Dreams: Definitive Edition	Diplodocus Games	Diplodocus Games	Unreleased	Unreleased	December 25, 2020	December 24, 2020	
Coqui The Game	Alberto Roman	Team One	Unreleased	June 1, 2017	Unreleased	Unreleased	
CosmiBall	DESK INK	DESK INK	Unreleased	October 20, 2022	Unreleased	Unreleased	
Cosmophony	Bento Studios	Moving Player	Unreleased	October 30, 2014	Unreleased	October 30, 2014	
Costume Quest 2	Double Fine Productions	Midnight City	Unreleased	October 31, 2014	October 31, 2014	October 31, 2014	
Crab Cakes Rescue	Mission Critical Studios	Maximum Games	Unreleased	August 20, 2015	Unreleased	Unreleased	
The Croods: Prehistoric Party! †	Torus Games	NA: D3 Publisher; PAL: Namco Bandai Games	Unreleased	March 19, 2013	April 11, 2013	March 29, 2013	
Crush Insects	38,9_Degrees	RandomSpin	Unreleased	November 22, 2018	Unreleased	Unreleased	
Crystorld	Toyuro	Toyuro	Unreleased	March 12, 2020	Unreleased	Unreleased	
Cube Blitz	Wildcard Studios	Wildcard Studios	Unreleased	June 4, 2015	Unreleased	Unreleased	
Cube Life: Island Survival	Cypronia	Cypronia	February 3, 2016	June 4, 2015	July 7, 2016	June 25, 2015	
Cube Life: Pixel Action Heroes	Cypronia	Cypronia	August 9, 2017	March 30, 2017	March 31, 2017	March 30, 2017	
Cubemen 2	3 Sprockets	Nnooo	Unreleased	September 4, 2014	September 4, 2014	September 4, 2014	
Cubeshift	Jace Voracek	Jace Voracek	Unreleased	July 27, 2017	Unreleased	Unreleased	
Cubit The Hardcore Platformer Robot HD	CoderChild	CoderChild	Unreleased	June 8, 2017	June 8, 2017	June 8, 2017	
Cup Critters	RCMADIAX	WW: RCMADIAX; JP: Cosen	April 12, 2017	January 5, 2017	January 6, 2017	January 5, 2017	
Cutie Clash	Yazar Media Group	Yazar Media Group	Unreleased	February 11, 2016	Unreleased	Unreleased	
Cutie Pets Go Fishing	Yazar Media Group	Yazar Media Group	Unreleased	February 11, 2016	Unreleased	Unreleased	
Cutie Pets Jump Rope	Yazar Media Group	Yazar Media Group	Unreleased	November 26, 2015	Unreleased	Unreleased	
Cutie Pets Pick Berries	Yazar Media Group	Yazar Media Group	Unreleased	October 22, 2015	Unreleased	Unreleased	
Cycle of Eternity: Space Anomaly	RandomSpin	RandomSpin	Unreleased	May 24, 2018	Unreleased	May 10, 2018	
D.M.L.C. Death Match Love Comedy	Kemco	Kemco	April 9, 2014	Unreleased	Unreleased	Unreleased	
Daikon Set	Butterfly	Batafurai	Unreleased	June 22, 2017	Unreleased	Unreleased	
Dare Up Adrenaline	Be Studios	Be Studios	Unreleased	July 9, 2015	Unreleased	Unreleased	
Darksiders II †	Vigil Games	THQ	Unreleased	November 18, 2012	November 30, 2012	November 30, 2012	
Darksiders: Warmastered Edition †	Kaiko	THQ Nordic	Unreleased	May 23, 2017	May 23, 2017	May 23, 2017	
Darts Up	EnjoyUp Games	EnjoyUp Games	September 30, 2015	September 25, 2014	Unreleased	September 18, 2014	
A Day at the Carnival	Thornbury Software	Thornbury Software	Unreleased	July 6, 2017	Unreleased	Unreleased	
The Deer God	Crescent Moon Games	Mobot Studios	Unreleased	April 28, 2016	Unreleased	Unreleased	
Defend Your Crypt	Ratalaika Games	Ratalaika Games	Unreleased	July 21, 2016	July 21, 2016	July 21, 2016	
Defense Dome	HullBreach Studios	HullBreach Studios	Unreleased	September 17, 2015	February 26, 2016	February 25, 2016	
Demonic Karma Summoner	Gnob Software	Gnob Software	Unreleased	October 27, 2016	Unreleased	Unreleased	
Deus Ex: Human Revolution – Director's Cut †	Eidos-Montréal; Straight Right; Snowed In Studios	Square Enix Europe	Unreleased	October 22, 2013	October 24, 2013	October 25, 2013	
Devil's Third †	Valhalla Game Studios; Nintendo SPD	Nintendo	August 4, 2015	December 11, 2015	August 29, 2015	August 28, 2015	
Dinox	Engine Software	Engine Software	Unreleased	December 10, 2015	Unreleased	December 10, 2015	
Discovery	Noowanda	Noowanda	August 31, 2016	January 7, 2016	February 11, 2016	February 11, 2016	
Disney Infinity †	Heavy Iron Studios	WW: Disney Interactive Studios; JP: Namco Bandai Games	November 28, 2013	August 18, 2013	August 22, 2013	August 23, 2013	
Disney Infinity 2.0 †	Avalanche Software	Disney Interactive Studios	Unreleased	September 23, 2014	September 18, 2014	September 18, 2014	
Disney Infinity 3.0 †	Avalanche Software	WW: Disney Interactive Studios; JP: Bandai Namco Entertainment	November 12, 2015	August 30, 2015	September 3, 2015	August 28, 2015	
Dodge Club Party	James Montagna; George Mathews	James Montagna	Unreleased	April 14, 2016	Unreleased	Unreleased	
DokiDoki Tegami Relay	Nintendo	Nintendo	June 24, 2015	Unreleased	Unreleased	Unreleased	
Dolphin Up	Rawkins Games	Rawkins Games	Unreleased	February 5, 2015	Unreleased	Unreleased	
Don't Crash	RCMADIAX	RCMADIAX	Unreleased	July 9, 2015	Unreleased	Unreleased	
Don't Starve: Giant Edition	Klei Entertainment	Klei Entertainment	Unreleased	May 28, 2015	June 4, 2015	June 4, 2015	
Don't Touch Anything Red	Helix Games	Helix Games	Unreleased	March 12, 2015	Unreleased	Unreleased	
Donkey Kong Country: Tropical Freeze †	Retro Studios; Monster Games	Nintendo	February 13, 2014	February 21, 2014	February 22, 2014	February 21, 2014	
Dot Arcade	James Montagna	James Montagna	Unreleased	March 26, 2015	Unreleased	Unreleased	
Double Breakout	nuGAME	nuGAME	Unreleased	September 22, 2016	Unreleased	September 22, 2016	
Double Breakout II	nuGAME	nuGAME	Unreleased	March 16, 2017	Unreleased	March 16, 2017	
Dr. Luigi	Arika; Nintendo SPD	Nintendo	January 15, 2014	December 31, 2013	January 15, 2014	January 15, 2014	
Dracula's Legacy	Joindots	Joindots	Unreleased	July 28, 2016	July 14, 2016	July 14, 2016	
Dragon Fantasy: The Black Tome of Ice	The Muteki Corporation	Choice Provisions	Unreleased	May 26, 2016	Unreleased	Unreleased	
Dragon Fantasy: The Volumes of Westeria	The Muteki Corporation	Choice Provisions	Unreleased	July 23, 2015	Unreleased	Unreleased	
Dragon Quest X: 5000-nen no Harukanaru Kokyou e Online †	Square Enix	Square Enix	November 16, 2017	Unreleased	Unreleased	Unreleased	
Dragon Quest X: Inishie no Ryuu no Denshou Online †	Square Enix	Square Enix	April 30, 2015	Unreleased	Unreleased	Unreleased	
Dragon Quest X: Mezameshi Itsutsu no Shuzoku Online †	Square Enix	Square Enix	March 30, 2013	Unreleased	Unreleased	Unreleased	
Dragon Quest X: Nemureru Yūsha to Michibiki no Meiyū Online †	Square Enix	Square Enix	December 5, 2013	Unreleased	Unreleased	Unreleased	
Dragon Skills	Joindots	Joindots	Unreleased	August 4, 2016	July 28, 2016	July 28, 2016	
Draw 2 Survive	Unit DTH Studios; Christian Sanders	Unit DTH Studios	Unreleased	April 14, 2016	Unreleased	Unreleased	
Draw a Stickman: Epic 2	Hitcents	Hitcents	Unreleased	November 30, 2017	Unreleased	February 8, 2018	
A Drawing's Journey	nuGAME	nuGAME	Unreleased	Unreleased	June 1, 2017	June 1, 2017	
Dreamals	XINESS	XINESS	Unreleased	April 21, 2016	March 11, 2016	March 10, 2016	
Dreamals: Dream Quest	XINESS	XINESS	Unreleased	September 29, 2016	September 22, 2016	September 22, 2016	
Dreii	Etter Studio	Bitforge	Unreleased	Unreleased	Unreleased	April 15, 2016	
Drop It: Block Paradise!	ZeNfA Productions	ZeNfA Productions	Unreleased	December 25, 2019	June 22, 2017	June 22, 2017	
Dual Core	Gray Fin Studios	Gray Fin Studios	Unreleased	May 26, 2016	May 23, 2016	June 24, 2016	
DuckTales: Remastered †	WayForward Technologies	Capcom	Unreleased	August 13, 2013	August 15, 2013	August 15, 2013	
Dungeons & Dragons: Chronicles of Mystara	Iron Galaxy Studios	Capcom	Unreleased	September 5, 2013	September 12, 2013	September 12, 2013	
Dungeon Hearts DX	Wolfgame	Wolfgame	Unreleased	November 10, 2016	Unreleased	Unreleased	
Dying is Dangerous	Carbon Fire Studio	Carbon Fire Studio	Unreleased	May 14, 2020	January 17, 2020	January 16, 2020	
Earthlock: Festival of Magic	Snowcastle Games	Snowcastle Games	Unreleased	September 14, 2017	Unreleased	September 7, 2017	
Eba & Egg: A Hatch Trip	Agile Drill Games	Daniel Morais	Unreleased	July 20, 2017	October 13, 2017	October 12, 2017	
Ectoplaza	Syndicate Atomic	CollectorVision	Unreleased	October 27, 2016	Unreleased	Unreleased	
Edge	Two Tribes	Two Tribes	November 21, 2013	November 21, 2013	November 21, 2013	November 21, 2013	
Educational Pack of Kids Games	Skunk Software	Skunk Software	Unreleased	June 23, 2016	Unreleased	Unreleased	
Electronic Super Joy	Michael Todd Games	Broken Rules	Unreleased	November 5, 2015	March 4, 2016	November 5, 2015	
Electronic Super Joy: Groove City	Yazar Media Group	Yazar Media Group	Unreleased	January 15, 2015	Unreleased	Unreleased	
Elliot Quest	Anzimuz Games	PlayEveryWare	March 23, 2015	March 19, 2015	April 7, 2016	April 16, 2015	
El Silla: Arcade Edition	Markanime Studios	Markanime Studios	Unreleased	April 15, 2019	January 19, 2019	January 18, 2019	
Emojikara: A Clever Emoji Match Game	Intropy Games	Intropy Games	Unreleased	April 7, 2016	Unreleased	Unreleased	
Endless Golf	Fanttum Games	Fanttum Games	Unreleased	July 30, 2015	Unreleased	Unreleased	
Epic Dumpster Bear	Log Games	Log Games	Unreleased	April 7, 2016	April 7, 2016	April 7, 2016	
Epic Mickey 2: The Power of Two †	Heavy Iron Studios	WW: Disney Interactive Studios; JP: Spike Chunsoft	September 26, 2013	November 18, 2012	December 13, 2012	November 30, 2012	
Escape from Flare Industries	Helix Games	Helix Games	Unreleased	May 5, 2016	Unreleased	Unreleased	
ESPN Sports Connection^{NA} Sports Connection^{WW} †	Ubisoft Barcelona; Longtail Studios	Ubisoft	December 20, 2012	November 18, 2012	November 30, 2012	November 30, 2012	
Evofish	Moving Player	Moving Player	Unreleased	April 3, 2014	April 24, 2014	February 27, 2014	
Exile's End	Magnetic Realms	Xseed Games	Unreleased	November 22, 2016	November 25, 2016	November 24, 2016	
Explody Bomb	Alkterios Games	Alkterios Games	Unreleased	September 10, 2015	Unreleased	Unreleased	
Extreme Exorcism	Golden Ruby Games	Ripstone	Unreleased	September 23, 2015	September 23, 2015	September 23, 2015	
F1 Race Stars: Powered Up Edition †	Codemasters Birmingham	Codemasters	June 27, 2013	January 16, 2014	January 17, 2014	January 16, 2014	
Factotum	Tacs Games	Tacs Games	Unreleased	August 20, 2015	Unreleased	Unreleased	
Fake Colors	Forthright Entertainment	Forthright Entertainment	December 20, 2012	December 4, 2012	Unreleased	November 30, 2012	
The Fall	Over the Moon Games	Over the Moon Games	Unreleased	August 26, 2014	March 13, 2015	August 26, 2014	
Falling Skies: The Game	Torus Games	Little Orbit	Unreleased	October 30, 2014	Unreleased	October 30, 2014	
Family Party: 30 Great Games Obstacle Arcade †	Art Co., Ltd	JP/NA: D3 Publisher; PAL: Namco Bandai Games	December 20, 2012	December 4, 2012	November 30, 2012	November 30, 2012	
Family Tennis SP	Arc System Works	Shin'en Multimedia	Unreleased	January 15, 2015	January 29, 2016	January 15, 2015	
Fast & Furious: Showdown †	Firebrand Games	Activision	Unreleased	May 21, 2013	May 22, 2013	May 24, 2013	
Fast Racing Neo †	Shin'en Multimedia	WW: Shin'en Multimedia; JP: Arc System Works	December 22, 2015	December 10, 2015	December 11, 2015	December 10, 2015	
Fat City	Heavy Iron Studios	Heavy Iron Studios	Unreleased	June 18, 2015	Unreleased	Unreleased	
Fat Dragons	Nostatic Software	Nostatic Software	Unreleased	February 22, 2018	February 16, 2018	February 15, 2018	
Fatal Frame: Maiden of Black Water^{NA} Project Zero: Maiden of Black Water^{PAL} †	Koei Tecmo; Nintendo SPD	Nintendo	September 27, 2014	October 22, 2015	October 31, 2015	October 30, 2015	
FIFA 13 †	EA Canada	EA Sports	December 8, 2012	November 18, 2012	November 30, 2012	November 30, 2012	
Fifteen	RCMADIAX	RCMADIAX	Unreleased	May 4, 2017	May 4, 2017	May 4, 2017	
Fire: Ungh's Quest	Daedalic Entertainment	Daedalic Entertainment	Unreleased	Unreleased	Unreleased	October 20, 2016	
The First Skunk Bundle	Skunk Software	Skunk Software	Unreleased	September 1, 2016	Unreleased	Unreleased	
Fist of the North Star: Ken's Rage 2 †	Koei	Tecmo Koei	January 31, 2013	February 7, 2013	February 7, 2013	February 7, 2013	
Fit Music for Wii U †	Reward Studios	O2 Games	Unreleased	May 22, 2014	Unreleased	May 15, 2014	
Flapp & Zegeta	Denysoft	Denysoft	Unreleased	November 6, 2014	Unreleased	Unreleased	
Flight of Light	Crystalline Green	Crystalline Green	Unreleased	August 3, 2017	August 3, 2017	August 3, 2017	
Flowerworks HD: Follie's Adventure	Nocturnal Entertainment	Nocturnal Entertainment	Unreleased	April 17, 2014	Unreleased	July 3, 2014	
Forced	BetaDwarf	BetaDwarf	Unreleased	October 24, 2013	October 24, 2013	October 24, 2013	
Forest Escape	RandomSpin	RandomSpin	Unreleased	August 2, 2018	Unreleased	August 2, 2018	
forma.8	MixedBag	MixedBag	Unreleased	February 23, 2017	February 24, 2017	February 23, 2017	
Frag doch mal...die Maus!	Application Systems Heidelberg	ASHGAMES	Unreleased	Unreleased	Unreleased	December 1, 2016	
Frankenstein: Master of Death	Joindots	Joindots	Unreleased	Unreleased	August 11, 2016	August 11, 2016	
Frederic: Resurrection of Music	Forever Entertainment	Forever Entertainment	Unreleased	July 31, 2014	Unreleased	Unreleased	
Free Balling	Skunk Software	Skunk Software	Unreleased	September 1, 2016	Unreleased	Unreleased	
Freedom Planet	GalaxyTrail	GalaxyTrail	Unreleased	July 21, 2014	October 29, 2015	October 29, 2015	
FreezeME	Rainy Night Creations	Rainy Night Creations	July 6, 2016	February 4, 2016	April 1, 2016	March 31, 2016	
Frenchy Bird	Carbon Fire Studio	Carbon Fire Studio	Unreleased	January 29, 2015	February 5, 2016	February 5, 2015	
Fujiko F. Fujio Characters: Daishuugou! SF Dotabata Party! †	Bandai Namco Games	Bandai Namco Games	November 20, 2014	Unreleased	Unreleased	Unreleased	
FullBlast	UFO Crash Games	EnjoyUp Games	November 25, 2015	August 27, 2015	Unreleased	June 4, 2015	
Funk of Titans	A Crowd of Monsters	EnjoyUp Games	Unreleased	May 14, 2015	Unreleased	July 9, 2015	
Funky Barn †	Tantalus Media	505 Games	Unreleased	November 18, 2012	November 30, 2012	November 30, 2012	
Funky Physics	Petite Games	Petite Games	Unreleased	September 10, 2015	Unreleased	Unreleased	
Futuridium EP Deluxe	Mixed Bag	Mixed Bag	Unreleased	May 26, 2016	Unreleased	May 26, 2016	
Gaiabreaker	AQ Interactive	Ubiquitous Entertainment	December 25, 2013	August 14, 2014	July 17, 2014	July 17, 2014	
Galaxy Blaster	RCMADIAX	RCMADIAX	Unreleased	July 20, 2017	July 27, 2017	July 27, 2017	
Game & Wario †	Nintendo SPD; Intelligent Systems	Nintendo	March 28, 2013	June 23, 2013	June 29, 2013	June 28, 2013	
Game Party Champions †	Phosphor	Warner Bros. Interactive Entertainment	Unreleased	November 18, 2012	November 30, 2012	November 30, 2012	
Games for Toddlers	Skunk Software	Chris McFarland	Unreleased	September 1, 2016	Unreleased	Unreleased	
Gear Gauntlet	Drop Dead Interactive	Crystalline Green	Unreleased	September 15, 2016	September 15, 2016	September 15, 2016	
The Gem Collector	TreeFall Studios	TreeFall Studios	Unreleased	September 8, 2016	September 7, 2017	September 7, 2017	
Gemology	BNC Design Studios	BNC Design Studios	Unreleased	October 1, 2015	Unreleased	Unreleased	
Geom	Pablo R. Millan	Andraconus	Unreleased	June 19, 2014	Unreleased	Unreleased	
GetClose: A game for Rivals	Wombat Source	Wombat Source	Unreleased	November 27, 2014	Unreleased	Unreleased	
Ghost Blade HD	Hucast	2Dream	Unreleased	February 28, 2017	March 1, 2017	February 28, 2017	
Giana Sisters: Twisted Dreams	Black Forest Games	Black Forest Games	March 18, 2015	September 5, 2013	August 22, 2013	August 22, 2013	
Giana Sisters: Twisted Dreams Director's Cut †	Black Forest Games	Alliance Digital Media	Unreleased	September 8, 2015	Unreleased	Unreleased	
Ginsei Shogi: Kyoutendotou Fuuraijin †	SilverStar	SilverStar	February 25, 2016	Unreleased	Unreleased	Unreleased	
The Girl and the Robot	Flying Carpets Games	WW: Flying Carpets Games; JP: CrossFunction	September 13, 2017	May 25, 2017	June 22, 2017	June 22, 2017	
Girls Like Robots	Popcannibal	JP: Unity Games Japan; NA: Popcannibal	July 29, 2015	November 12, 2015	Unreleased	Unreleased	
Gotouchi Tetsudou: Gotouchi Kyara to Nihon Zenkoku no Tabi †	Grounding Inc.	Bandai Namco Games	November 27, 2014	Unreleased	Unreleased	Unreleased	
Grand Prix Rock 'N Racing	EnjoyUp Games	WW: EnjoyUp Games; JP: Cosen	March 29, 2017	September 15, 2016	September 15, 2016	September 15, 2016	
GravBlocks+	From Nothing Game Studios	From Nothing Game Studios	Unreleased	February 26, 2015	Unreleased	Unreleased	
Gravity+	Nitrolic Games	Nitrolic Games	Unreleased	November 3, 2016	November 4, 2016	November 3, 2016	
Gravity Badgers	Wales Interactive	Wales Interactive	Unreleased	May 29, 2014	Unreleased	May 29, 2014	
The Great Race	Burn House Effects	Burn House Effects	June 1, 2016	Unreleased	Unreleased	Unreleased	
Grumpy Reaper	EnjoyUp Games	EnjoyUp Games	August 24, 2016	March 10, 2016	Unreleased	March 3, 2016	
Guac' a Mole	Madskull Creations	Madskull Creations	Unreleased	Unreleased	Unreleased	April 9, 2015	
Guacamelee! Super Turbo Championship Edition	Broken Rules	DrinkBox Studios	Unreleased	July 2, 2014	July 2, 2014	July 2, 2014	
Guitar Hero Live †	FreeStyleGames	Activision	Unreleased	October 20, 2015	October 20, 2015	October 23, 2015	
Gunman Clive HD Collection	Hörberg Productions	WW: Hörberg Productions; JP: Flyhigh Works	October 28, 2015	September 3, 2015	September 3, 2015	September 3, 2015	
Hello Kitty Kruisers †	Scarab Entertainment	Bergsala Lightweight	Unreleased	March 21, 2014	November 7, 2015	November 6, 2015	
Heptrix	José Varela	José Varela	Unreleased	November 27, 2014	Unreleased	Unreleased	
High Strangeness	Barnyard Intelligence Games	Midnight City	Unreleased	May 6, 2015	Unreleased	May 28, 2015	
Hive Jump	Graphite Lab	Black Lantern Studios	Unreleased	September 28, 2017	Unreleased	Unreleased	
Hold Your Fire: A Game About Responsibility	Alkterios Games	Alkterios Games	Unreleased	September 24, 2015	Unreleased	Unreleased	
Horror Stories	RandomSpin	Vadim Gafton	Unreleased	July 4, 2019	July 4, 2019	July 4, 2019	
Hot Rod Racer	ZeNfA Productions	ZeNfA Productions	Unreleased	July 21, 2016	July 21, 2016	July 21, 2016	
Hot Wheels: World's Best Driver †	Firebrand Games	Warner Bros. Interactive Entertainment	Unreleased	September 17, 2013	October 2, 2013	September 20, 2013	
How to Survive	Eko Software	505 Games	Unreleased	June 19, 2014	June 5, 2014	June 5, 2014	
How to Train Your Dragon 2 †	Torus Games	Little Orbit	Unreleased	June 10, 2014	Unreleased	June 12, 2014	
Human Resource Machine	Tomorrow Corporation	Tomorrow Corporation	Unreleased	October 29, 2015	December 4, 2015	December 3, 2015	
Humanitarian Helicopter	Peaceful Games	Peaceful Games	Unreleased	July 21, 2016	Unreleased	Unreleased	
Hunter's Trophy 2: Europa †	Kylotonn	Neko Entertainment	Unreleased	Unreleased	Unreleased	October 25, 2013	
HurryUp! Bird Hunter	EnjoyUp Games	EnjoyUp Games	Unreleased	October 6, 2016	July 14, 2016	July 14, 2016	
Hyrule Warriors †	Omega Force; Team Ninja	JP: Koei Tecmo; WW: Nintendo	August 14, 2014	September 26, 2014	September 20, 2014	September 19, 2014	
I C Redd	RCMADIAX	RCMADIAX	Unreleased	February 2, 2017	February 17, 2017	February 16, 2017	
I've Got to Run!	4 Corner Games	4 Corner Games	Unreleased	June 5, 2014	Unreleased	Unreleased	
Ice Cream Surfer	Dolores Entertainment	Dolores Entertainment	Unreleased	September 4, 2014	Unreleased	July 31, 2014	
Infinity Runner	Wales Interactive	Wales Interactive	Unreleased	March 15, 2016	March 25, 2016	March 24, 2016	
Injustice: Gods Among Us †	NetherRealm Studios	Warner Bros. Interactive Entertainment	June 27, 2013	April 16, 2013	April 24, 2013	April 26, 2013	
Insect Planet TD	RandomSpin	RandomSpin	Unreleased	October 25, 2018	Unreleased	November 22, 2018	
Inside My Radio	Seaven Studio	Seaven Studio	Unreleased	February 25, 2016	February 26, 2016	February 25, 2016	
Internal Invasion	Bear Box Media	Bear Box Media	Unreleased	July 3, 2014	Unreleased	Unreleased	
Invanoid	RCMADIAX	RCMADIAX	Unreleased	June 30, 2016	Unreleased	Unreleased	
IQ Test	Jordan Schuetz	Ninja Pig Studios	Unreleased	July 31, 2014	Unreleased	Unreleased	
Island Flight Simulator	Caipirinha Games; Silent Future; Joindots	Joindots	Unreleased	December 17, 2015	Unreleased	December 17, 2015	
Ittle Dew	Ludosity	Ludosity	October 14, 2015	May 29, 2014	Unreleased	November 27, 2014	
Jackpot 777	RCMADIAX	RCMADIAX	Unreleased	July 14, 2016	July 14, 2016	July 14, 2016	
Jeopardy! †	Pipeworks Software	THQ	Unreleased	December 14, 2012	Unreleased	Unreleased	
Jett Tailfin †	Hoplite Research; Ilusis Interactive Graphics	HR Games	Unreleased	August 7, 2014	Unreleased	October 30, 2014	
Jewel Quest	PlayEveryWare	iWin	Unreleased	March 10, 2016	July 21, 2016	July 21, 2016	
Jikan Satansa	Nintendo	Nintendo	June 24, 2015	Unreleased	Unreleased	Unreleased	
Job the Leprechaun	Herrero Games	Herrero Games	Unreleased	September 24, 2015	January 13, 2017	December 17, 2015	
Joe's Diner	VIS Games; Silent Future; Joindots	Joindots	Unreleased	January 28, 2016	Unreleased	February 4, 2016	
Jolt Family Robot Racer	Cooply Solutions	Cooply Solutions	Unreleased	January 11, 2018	January 12, 2018	January 11, 2018	
Jones on Fire	Glass Bottom Games; Silent Future; Joindots	Joindots	Unreleased	December 10, 2015	Unreleased	February 11, 2016	
Jotun: Valhalla Edition	Thunder Lotus Games	Thunder Lotus Games	Unreleased	September 8, 2016	September 8, 2016	September 8, 2016	
Journey of a Special Average Balloon	TreeFall Studios	TreeFall Studios	Unreleased	May 21, 2015	Unreleased	Unreleased	
Just Dance 4 †	Ubisoft Paris; Ubisoft Reflections; Ubisoft Bucharest; Ubisoft Pune; Ubisoft Milan	Ubisoft	Unreleased	November 18, 2012	November 30, 2012	November 30, 2012	
Just Dance 2014 †	Ubisoft Paris; Ubisoft Reflections; Ubisoft Montpellier; Ubisoft Bucharest; Ubisoft Milan; Ubisoft Pune	Ubisoft	Unreleased	October 8, 2013	October 1, 2013	October 1, 2013	
Just Dance 2015 †	Ubisoft Paris; Ubisoft Reflections; Ubisoft Pune; Ubisoft Milan; Ubisoft Bucharest	Ubisoft	Unreleased	October 21, 2014	October 23, 2014	October 23, 2014	
Just Dance 2016 †	Ubisoft Paris; Ubisoft Pune	Ubisoft	Unreleased	October 20, 2015	October 22, 2015	October 22, 2015	
Just Dance 2017 †	Ubisoft Paris; Ubisoft Pune	Ubisoft	Unreleased	October 25, 2016	October 27, 2016	October 27, 2016	
Just Dance 2018 †	Ubisoft Paris; Ubisoft Pune; Ubisoft Shanghai	Ubisoft	Unreleased	October 24, 2017	October 26, 2017	October 26, 2017	
Just Dance 2019 †	Ubisoft Paris; Ubisoft Pune; Ubisoft Shanghai	Ubisoft	Unreleased	October 23, 2018	October 25, 2018	October 25, 2018	
Just Dance: Disney Party 2 †	Ubisoft San Francisco	Ubisoft	Unreleased	October 20, 2015	October 23, 2015	October 23, 2015	
Just Dance Kids 2014 †	Ubisoft Osaka	Ubisoft	Unreleased	October 22, 2013	October 24, 2013	October 25, 2013	
Just Dance Wii U †	Ubisoft Paris; Ubisoft Reflections; Ubisoft Montpellier; Ubisoft Bucharest; Ubisoft Milan; Ubisoft Pune	Nintendo	April 3, 2014	Unreleased	Unreleased	Unreleased	
Kamen Rider: Battride War II †	Eighting; Bandai Namco Studios	Bandai Namco Games	June 26, 2014	Unreleased	Unreleased	Unreleased	
Kamen Rider: Summonride †	Eighting	Bandai Namco Games	December 8, 2014	Unreleased	Unreleased	Unreleased	
Kemono Dash	Rocket Studio	Rocket Studio	December 17, 2014	Unreleased	Unreleased	Unreleased	
Kick & Fennick	Jaywalkers Interactive	Abstraction Games	Unreleased	June 2, 2016	June 2, 2016	June 2, 2016	
KickBeat: Special Edition	Zen Studios	Zen Studios	Unreleased	September 16, 2014	September 16, 2014	September 16, 2014	
Kirby and the Rainbow Curse^{NA} Kirby and the Rainbow Paintbrush^{PAL} †	HAL Laboratory; Nintendo SPD	Nintendo	January 22, 2015	February 20, 2015	May 9, 2015	May 8, 2015	
Koi DX	Dotoyou Technology	Circle Entertainment	Unreleased	January 19, 2017	February 3, 2017	February 2, 2017	
Knytt Underground	MP2 Games	WW: Ripstone; JP: Flyhigh Works	August 20, 2014	December 19, 2013	December 20, 2013	December 19, 2013	
Kung Fu Fight!	Nostatic Software	Nostatic Software	Unreleased	August 6, 2015	December 25, 2015	December 24, 2015	
Kung Fu Panda: Showdown of Legendary Legends †	Vicious Cycle Software	Little Orbit	Unreleased	December 15, 2015	December 15, 2015	December 15, 2015	
Kung Fu Rabbit	cTools Studio	Neko Entertainment	November 19, 2014	May 2, 2013	April 18, 2013	April 18, 2013	
Land It Rocket	Bear Box Media	Petite Games	Unreleased	July 9, 2015	Unreleased	Unreleased	
Laser Blaster	Petite Games	Petite Games	Unreleased	September 22, 2016	September 22, 2016	September 22, 2016	
Last Soldier	38,9_Degrees	RandomSpin	Unreleased	November 15, 2018	Unreleased	Unreleased	
Legend of Kay Anniversary †	Kaiko	Nordic Games	Unreleased	July 28, 2015	July 28, 2015	July 28, 2015	
The Legend of Zelda: Breath of the Wild †	Nintendo EPD; Monolith Soft	Nintendo	March 3, 2017	March 3, 2017	March 3, 2017	March 3, 2017	
The Legend of Zelda: Twilight Princess HD †	Tantalus Media; Nintendo EPD	Nintendo	March 10, 2016	March 4, 2016	March 5, 2016	March 4, 2016	
The Legend of Zelda: The Wind Waker HD †	Nintendo EAD	Nintendo	September 26, 2013	September 20, 2013	October 5, 2013	October 4, 2013	
Lego Batman 2: DC Super Heroes †	Traveller's Tales	Warner Bros. Interactive Entertainment	Unreleased	May 21, 2013	May 24, 2013	May 24, 2013	
Lego Batman 3: Beyond Gotham †	Traveller's Tales	Warner Bros. Interactive Entertainment	April 2, 2015	November 11, 2014	November 26, 2014	November 14, 2014	
Lego City Undercover †	TT Fusion	Nintendo	July 25, 2013	March 18, 2013	March 28, 2013	March 28, 2013	
Lego Dimensions †	Traveller's Tales	Warner Bros. Interactive Entertainment	Unreleased	September 27, 2015	September 28, 2015	September 29, 2015	
Lego The Hobbit †	Traveller's Tales	Warner Bros. Interactive Entertainment	Unreleased	April 22, 2014	May 7, 2014	April 11, 2014	
Lego Jurassic World †	TT Fusion	Warner Bros. Interactive Entertainment	November 5, 2015	June 12, 2015	July 8, 2015	July 3, 2015	
Lego Marvel's Avengers †	Traveller's Tales	Warner Bros. Interactive Entertainment	January 26, 2016	January 26, 2016	January 30, 2016	January 29, 2016	
Lego Marvel Super Heroes †	Traveller's Tales	Warner Bros. Interactive Entertainment	January 22, 2015	October 22, 2013	November 13, 2013	November 15, 2013	
The Lego Movie Videogame †	TT Fusion	Warner Bros. Interactive Entertainment	November 6, 2014	February 7, 2014	April 3, 2014	February 14, 2014	
Lego Star Wars: The Force Awakens †	TT Fusion	Warner Bros. Interactive Entertainment	October 13, 2016	June 28, 2016	June 28, 2016	June 28, 2016	
The Letter	TreeFall Studios	TreeFall Studios	Unreleased	July 10, 2014	July 10, 2014	July 10, 2014	
Letter Quest Remastered	Bacon Bandit Games	Digerati	Unreleased	September 8, 2016	July 28, 2016	July 28, 2016	
Level 22, Gary's Misadventures	Moving Player	Moving Player	Unreleased	January 28, 2016	Unreleased	January 28, 2016	
Life of Pixel	Super Icon	Super Icon	Unreleased	June 18, 2015	January 22, 2016	January 21, 2016	
Little Inferno	Tomorrow Corporation	Tomorrow Corporation	April 2, 2015	November 18, 2012	November 30, 2012	November 30, 2012	
Lone Survivor: The Director's Cut	Curve Studios	Curve Digital	Unreleased	October 16, 2014	October 17, 2014	October 16, 2014	
Lost Reavers	Bandai Namco Studios	Bandai Namco Entertainment	December 2, 2015	April 28, 2016	April 28, 2016	April 28, 2016	
Lovely Planet	Quicktequila	tinyBuild	Unreleased	March 31, 2016	April 7, 2016	April 7, 2016	
Lucadian Chronicles	Dark Roast Entertainment	Dark Roast Entertainment	Unreleased	December 11, 2014	Unreleased	Unreleased	
Lucentek Beyond	Joseph Lucente	Lucentek	Unreleased	February 2, 2017	Unreleased	Unreleased	
Lucentek: Activate	Joseph Lucentre	Joseph Lucentre	Unreleased	November 19, 2015	Unreleased	Unreleased	
Luv Me Buddies Wonderland †	Reward Studios	O2 Games	Unreleased	May 29, 2014	Unreleased	June 26, 2014	
Madden NFL 13 †	EA Tiburon	EA Sports	Unreleased	November 18, 2012	Unreleased	Unreleased	
Mahjong	Sanuk Games	Sanuk Games	Unreleased	October 13, 2016	September 22, 2016	September 22, 2016	
Mahjong Deluxe 3	EnsenaSoft	EnsenaSoft	Unreleased	March 16, 2017	Unreleased	Unreleased	
Manabi Getto!	Gakken; Toppan	Gakken; Toppan	April 28, 2015	Unreleased	Unreleased	Unreleased	
Mario & Sonic at the Rio 2016 Olympic Games †	Sega	Nintendo	June 23, 2016	June 24, 2016	June 25, 2016	June 24, 2016	
Mario & Sonic at the Sochi 2014 Olympic Winter Games †	Sega	Nintendo	December 5, 2013	November 15, 2013	November 9, 2013	November 8, 2013	
Mario Kart 8 †	Nintendo EAD; Bandai Namco Studios	Nintendo	May 29, 2014	May 30, 2014	May 31, 2014	May 30, 2014	
Mario Party 10 †	NDcube	Nintendo	March 12, 2015	March 20, 2015	March 21, 2015	March 20, 2015	
Mario Tennis: Ultra Smash †	Camelot Software Planning	Nintendo	January 28, 2016	November 20, 2015	November 21, 2015	November 20, 2015	
Mario vs. Donkey Kong: Tipping Stars †	Nintendo Software Technology	Nintendo	March 19, 2015	March 5, 2015	March 21, 2015	March 20, 2015	
Marvel Avengers: Battle for Earth †	Ubisoft Quebec	Ubisoft	Unreleased	December 4, 2012	February 14, 2013	January 24, 2013	
Masked Forces	R.G.B.	R.G.B.	Unreleased	May 31, 2018	May 3, 2018	May 3, 2018	
Mass Effect 3: Special Edition †	Straight Right	Electronic Arts	December 8, 2012	November 18, 2012	November 30, 2012	November 30, 2012	
Master Reboot	Wales Interactive	Wales Interactive	December 16, 2015	July 24, 2014	Unreleased	July 24, 2014	
Maze	TreeFall Studios	TreeFall Studios	Unreleased	January 8, 2015	Unreleased	Unreleased	
Maze Break	nuGAME	nuGAME	Unreleased	February 23, 2017	February 10, 2017	February 9, 2017	
Mega Maze	Chronova	Chronova	Unreleased	January 19, 2017	Unreleased	Unreleased	
Meine Ersten Mitsing-Lieder	Ringzero Games	Ringzero Games	Unreleased	Unreleased	Unreleased	November 10, 2014	
Meme Run	Ninja Pig Studios	Ninja Pig Studios	Unreleased	December 18, 2014	December 18, 2014	December 18, 2014	
Michiko Jump!	Nintendo	Nintendo	June 24, 2015	Unreleased	Unreleased	Unreleased	
Midnight	Vilmos Gyokeres	Petite Games	Unreleased	January 22, 2015	Unreleased	Unreleased	
Midnight 2	Petite Games	Petite Games	Unreleased	May 5, 2016	June 30, 2016	June 30, 2016	
Midtown Crazy Race	José Varela	José Varela	Unreleased	August 21, 2014	Unreleased	July 31, 2014	
Mighty No. 9 †	Comcept; Inti Creates	WW: Deep Silver; JP: Spike Chunsoft	June 21, 2016	June 21, 2016	June 24, 2016	June 24, 2016	
Mighty Switch Force! Hyper Drive Edition	WayForward Technologies	WW: WayForward Technologies; JP: Intergrow	September 10, 2014	November 18, 2012	June 6, 2013	December 6, 2012	
Mighty Switch Force! 2	WayForward Technologies	WayForward Technologies	Unreleased	October 17, 2013	October 24, 2013	October 24, 2013	
Miko Mole	Skunk Software	Skunk Software	Unreleased	June 4, 2016	Unreleased	Unreleased	
MikroGame: Rotator	Studio de la Torre	Studio de la Torre	Unreleased	August 18, 2016	September 15, 2016	September 15, 2016	
Minecraft: Story Mode - The Complete Adventure †	Telltale Games	Telltale Games	Unreleased	December 13, 2016	December 16, 2016	December 16, 2016	
Minecraft: Wii U Edition †	4J Studios	Mojang	December 17, 2015	December 17, 2015	December 18, 2015	December 17, 2015	
Mini Mario & Friends: Amiibo Challenge	Nintendo Software Technology	Nintendo	January 28, 2016	April 28, 2016	April 28, 2016	April 28, 2016	
Mini-Games Madness Volume #1: Hello World!	Skunk Software	Skunk Software	Unreleased	January 28, 2016	Unreleased	Unreleased	
Minna de Uchū Tour: ChariSou DX 2	Spicysoft	Spicysoft	October 14, 2015	Unreleased	Unreleased	Unreleased	
The Misshitsukara no Dasshutsu: Subete no Hajimari 16 no Nazo	Intense	D3 Publisher	April 9, 2014	Unreleased	Unreleased	Unreleased	
The Misshitsukara no Dasshutsu 2: Kesareta 19 no Kioku	Intense	D3 Publisher	August 6, 2014	Unreleased	Unreleased	Unreleased	
Molly Maggot	Gnobsoftware	Gnobsoftware	Unreleased	December 31, 2015	Unreleased	Unreleased	
Momonga Pinball Adventures	Paladin Studios	Paladin Studios	December 17, 2015	October 15, 2015	Unreleased	October 15, 2015	
Mon Premier Karaoké	Ring Zero	Ring Zero	Unreleased	April 2, 2015	Unreleased	September 18, 2014	
Monkey Pirates	Henchmen Studio	Henchmen Studio	Unreleased	June 26, 2014	Unreleased	June 19, 2014	
Monster High: 13 Wishes †	Game Machine Studios	Little Orbit	Unreleased	October 29, 2013	Unreleased	November 22, 2013	
Monster High: New Ghoul in School †	Torus Games	Little Orbit	Unreleased	November 17, 2015	Unreleased	November 23, 2015	
Monster Hunter 3 Ultimate †	Capcom	Capcom	December 8, 2012	March 19, 2013	March 23, 2013	March 22, 2013	
Monster Hunter Frontier G †	Capcom	Capcom	December 11, 2013	Unreleased	Unreleased	Unreleased	
Monster Hunter Frontier GG †	Capcom	Capcom	April 23, 2014	Unreleased	Unreleased	Unreleased	
Monster Hunter Frontier G5 †	Capcom	Capcom	July 23, 2014	Unreleased	Unreleased	Unreleased	
Monster Hunter Frontier G6 †	Capcom	Capcom	November 19, 2014	Unreleased	Unreleased	Unreleased	
Monster Hunter Frontier G7 †	Capcom	Capcom	April 15, 2015	Unreleased	Unreleased	Unreleased	
Monster Hunter Frontier G8 †	Capcom	Capcom	July 22, 2015	Unreleased	Unreleased	Unreleased	
Monster Hunter Frontier G9 †	Capcom	Capcom	November 18, 2015	Unreleased	Unreleased	Unreleased	
Monster Hunter Frontier G10 †	Capcom	Capcom	April 21, 2016	Unreleased	Unreleased	Unreleased	
Monster Hunter Frontier Z	Capcom	Capcom	November 9, 2016	Unreleased	Unreleased	Unreleased	
Mop: Operation Cleanup	EnsenaSoft	EnsenaSoft	Unreleased	April 20, 2017	Unreleased	Unreleased	
Mortar Melon	Mudvark; Nitrolic Games	Nitrolic Games	Unreleased	August 20, 2015	August 11, 2016	August 11, 2016	
Mountain Peak Battle Mess	RandomSpin	Vadim Gafton	Unreleased	October 24, 2019	October 25, 2019	October 24, 2019	
Mr. Pumpkin Adventure	CottenGame	Circle Entertainment	Unreleased	October 20, 2016	October 28, 2016	October 27, 2016	
Mutant Alien Moles of the Dead	Pixel Bones Studios	EnjoyUp Games	Unreleased	June 15, 2017	March 31, 2017	March 30, 2017	
Mutant Mudds Deluxe	Renegade Kid	Renegade Kid	June 24, 2015	June 13, 2013	Unreleased	Unreleased	
Mutant Mudds Super Challenge	Renegade Kid	Renegade Kid	Unreleased	March 17, 2016	March 18, 2016	March 17, 2016	
My Arctic Farm	Bip Media	Bip Media	Unreleased	June 26, 2014	Unreleased	Unreleased	
My Exotic Farm	Bip Media	Bip Media	Unreleased	April 10, 2014	Unreleased	April 17, 2014	
My Farm	Bip Media	Bip Media	Unreleased	February 27, 2014	Unreleased	February 6, 2014	
My First Songs	RingZero Game Studio	RingZero Game Studio	Unreleased	April 17, 2014	Unreleased	June 12, 2014	
My Jurassic Farm	Bip Media	Bip Media	Unreleased	June 26, 2014	Unreleased	Unreleased	
My Style Studio: Hair Salon	Cypronia	Cypronia	Unreleased	March 27, 2014	Unreleased	October 23, 2014	
The Mysterious Cities of Gold: Secret Paths	Neko Entertainment	Ynnis Interactive	Unreleased	November 21, 2013	November 22, 2013	November 21, 2013	
Nano Assault Neo	Shin'en Multimedia	WW: Shin'en Multimedia; JP: Arc System Works	February 27, 2013	November 18, 2012	November 30, 2012	November 30, 2012	
NBA 2K13 †	Visual Concepts	2K Sports	Unreleased	November 18, 2012	December 27, 2012	December 15, 2012	
Near Earth Objects	Jay X Townsend	Form Up Studios	Unreleased	January 14, 2016	Unreleased	Unreleased	
Need for Speed: Most Wanted U †	Criterion Games	Electronic Arts	March 20, 2013	March 19, 2013	March 21, 2013	March 22, 2013	
Neon Battle	Helix Games	Helix Games	Unreleased	July 9, 2015	Unreleased	Unreleased	
NES Remix †	Nintendo EAD Tokyo; indieszero	Nintendo	December 19, 2013	December 18, 2013	December 19, 2013	December 18, 2013	
NES Remix 2 †	Nintendo EAD Tokyo; indieszero	Nintendo	April 24, 2014	April 25, 2014	April 25, 2014	April 25, 2014	
Never Alone	Upper One Games	E-Line Media	August 19, 2015	June 25, 2015	July 9, 2015	July 9, 2015	
New Super Luigi U †	Nintendo EAD	Nintendo	June 19, 2013	June 20, 2013	June 21, 2013	June 20, 2013	
New Super Mario Bros. U †	Nintendo EAD	Nintendo	December 8, 2012	November 18, 2012	November 30, 2012	November 30, 2012	
Nihilumbra	BeautiFun Games	BeautiFun Games	December 9, 2015	May 14, 2015	May 14, 2015	May 14, 2015	
Ninja Gaiden 3: Razor's Edge †	Team Ninja	WW: Nintendo; JP: Tecmo Koei	December 8, 2012	November 18, 2012	May 11, 2013	January 11, 2013	
Ninja Pizza Girl	Disparity Games	Disparity Games	November 9, 2016	October 6, 2016	October 7, 2016	October 6, 2016	
Ninja Strike: Dangerous Dash	Platinum Egg Inc.	Natsume Inc.	Unreleased	October 15, 2015	November 20, 2015	November 19, 2015	
Nintendo Game Seminar 2013 Jukousei Sakuhin	Nintendo	Nintendo	June 19, 2014	Unreleased	Unreleased	Unreleased	
Nintendo Land †	Nintendo EAD	Nintendo	December 8, 2012	November 18, 2012	November 30, 2012	November 30, 2012	
Noitu Love: Devolution	Joakim Sandberg; MP2 Games	MP2 Games	September 15, 2016	September 15, 2016	September 22, 2016	September 22, 2016	
Nova-111	Funktronic Labs	Curve Digital	Unreleased	September 24, 2015	September 24, 2015	September 24, 2015	
Now I know my ABCs	Skunk Software	Skunk Software	Unreleased	March 31, 2016	Unreleased	Unreleased	
Octocopter: Super Sub Squid Escape	Tacs Games	Tacs Games	Unreleased	November 24, 2016	November 25, 2016	November 24, 2016	
Octodad: Dadliest Catch	Panic Button	Young Horses	Unreleased	October 29, 2015	January 15, 2016	October 30, 2015	
Oddworld: New 'n' Tasty!	Just Add Water	Oddworld Inhabitants	Unreleased	February 11, 2016	February 12, 2016	February 11, 2016	
Ohayou! Beginner's Japanese	Finger Gun Games	Finger Gun Games	Unreleased	November 17, 2016	November 25, 2016	November 24, 2016	
OlliOlli	Carbon Games	Curve Digital	Unreleased	March 5, 2015	March 6, 2015	March 5, 2015	
Olympia Rising	PlayEveryWare	PlayEveryWare	Unreleased	June 9, 2016	April 14, 2016	April 14, 2016	
One Piece: Unlimited World Red †	Ganbarion	Bandai Namco Games	June 12, 2014	July 8, 2014	June 26, 2014	June 27, 2014	
Orbit	RCMADIAX	RCMADIAX	Unreleased	April 20, 2017	April 20, 2017	April 20, 2017	
Othello	Arc System Works	Arc System Works	April 17, 2013	Unreleased	Unreleased	Unreleased	
Outside The Realm	TreeFall Studios	TreeFall Studios	Unreleased	February 11, 2016	Unreleased	Unreleased	
Overworld Defender Remix	Overworld Galaxy; PJ Perretta; Jacob Crews	Stereo Chromatic	Unreleased	August 4, 2016	Unreleased	Unreleased	
Pac-Man and the Ghostly Adventures †	Monkey Bar Games	Namco Bandai Games	June 25, 2014	October 29, 2013	March 6, 2014	March 6, 2014	
Pac-Man and the Ghostly Adventures 2 †	Monkey Bar Games	Bandai Namco Games	October 14, 2014	October 14, 2014	October 14, 2014	October 14, 2014	
Pad of Time	Markanime Studios	Markanime Studios	Unreleased	April 21, 2022	April 13, 2022	April 13, 2022	
Panda Love	RCMADIAX	RCMADIAX	Unreleased	September 1, 2016	August 25, 2016	August 25, 2016	
Paparazzi	Pringo Dingo	Pringo Dingo	Unreleased	February 12, 2015	Unreleased	Unreleased	
Paper Mario: Color Splash †	Intelligent Systems	Nintendo	October 13, 2016	October 7, 2016	October 8, 2016	October 7, 2016	
Paper Monsters Recut	Mobot Studios	Mobot Studios	Unreleased	October 16, 2014	Unreleased	November 13, 2014	
Paranautical Activity	Digerati	Digerati	Unreleased	April 14, 2016	Unreleased	April 21, 2016	
The Peanuts Movie: Snoopy's Grand Adventure †	Behaviour Santiago	Activision	Unreleased	November 3, 2015	Unreleased	November 6, 2015	
Peg Solitaire	RCMADIAX	RCMADIAX	Unreleased	February 4, 2016	Unreleased	Unreleased	
Penguins of Madagascar †	Torus Games	Little Orbit	Unreleased	November 18, 2014	Unreleased	November 28, 2014	
Pentapuzzle	RCMADIAX	WW: RCMADIAX; JP: Rainy Frog	September 30, 2015	March 19, 2015	May 5, 2016	May 5, 2016	
Percy's Predicament	Maestro Interactive	Maestro Interactive	Unreleased	February 6, 2014	Unreleased	Unreleased	
Perpetual Blast	Yiannos Efthymiou	Yiannos Efthymiou	Unreleased	October 8, 2015	Unreleased	Unreleased	
The Perplexing Orb	TreeFall Studios	TreeFall Studios	Unreleased	January 14, 2016	Unreleased	Unreleased	
Petite Zombies	RandomSpin	RandomSpin	Unreleased	October 11, 2018	Unreleased	October 11, 2018	
Phineas and Ferb: Quest for Cool Stuff †	Behaviour Interactive	NA: Majesco; EU: 505 Games	Unreleased	August 13, 2013	Unreleased	March 7, 2014	
Piano Teacher	Skunk Software	Skunk Software	Unreleased	September 1, 2016	Unreleased	Unreleased	
Pic-a-Pix Color	Lightwood Games	Lightwood Games	Unreleased	April 13, 2017	Unreleased	March 30, 2017	
PictoParty	Retroid Interactive	Retroid Interactive	Unreleased	October 29, 2015	December 16, 2016	January 28, 2016	
Pier Solar and the Great Architects	WaterMelon	WaterMelon	Unreleased	November 6, 2014	Unreleased	November 27, 2014	
Pikmin 3 †	Nintendo EAD	Nintendo	July 13, 2013	August 4, 2013	July 27, 2013	July 26, 2013	
Pinball	RCMADIAX	RCMADIAX	Unreleased	May 18, 2017	May 18, 2017	May 18, 2017	
The Pinball Arcade	FarSight Studios	FarSight Studios	Unreleased	April 21, 2016	Unreleased	Unreleased	
Pinball Breakout	nuGAME	nuGAME	Unreleased	November 3, 2016	Unreleased	November 3, 2016	
Ping 1.5+	Nami Tentou Mushi	Nami Tentou Mushi	Unreleased	October 16, 2014	October 7, 2016	October 6, 2016	
Pirate Pop Plus	Dadako Studios	WW: 13AM Games; JP: Rainy Frog	February 22, 2017	October 20, 2016	October 21, 2016	October 20, 2016	
Pixel Slime U	RCMADIAX	RCMADIAX	Unreleased	August 27, 2015	May 12, 2016	May 12, 2016	
PixelJunk Monsters	Q-Games	Double Eleven	Unreleased	May 19, 2016	Unreleased	May 19, 2016	
PixlCross	PixlBit Studios	PixlBit Studios	Unreleased	March 31, 2016	Unreleased	Unreleased	
Placards	Wombat Source	JH Specialty	Unreleased	February 23, 2017	Unreleased	Unreleased	
Planes †	Behaviour Interactive	Disney Interactive Studios	Unreleased	August 6, 2013	September 5, 2013	August 16, 2013	
Planes: Fire & Rescue †	Game Machine Studios	Little Orbit	Unreleased	November 4, 2014	Unreleased	November 7, 2014	
Plantera	Ratalaika Games	Ratalaika Games	February 1, 2017	February 9, 2017	February 10, 2017	February 9, 2017	
Plenty of Fishies	Nitrolic Games	Nitrolic Games	Unreleased	December 18, 2014	August 11, 2016	August 11, 2016	
Pokémon Rumble U	Ambrella	The Pokémon Company; Nintendo	April 24, 2013	August 29, 2013	August 15, 2013	August 15, 2013	
Poker Dice Solitaire Future	RCMADIAX	RCMADIAX	April 28, 2015	July 3, 2014	Unreleased	Unreleased	
Pokkén Tournament †	Bandai Namco Studios	JP: The Pokémon Company; WW: Nintendo	March 18, 2016	March 18, 2016	March 19, 2016	March 18, 2016	
Poncho	Delve Interactive	Rising Star Games	Unreleased	August 18, 2016	August 19, 2016	August 18, 2016	
Preston Sterling and the Legend of Excalibur	Miracle Box Games	Miracle Box Games	Unreleased	June 29, 2017	Unreleased	June 1, 2017	
Prism Pets	Mouse Potato Games	Intropy Games	Unreleased	June 30, 2016	Unreleased	Unreleased	
Psibo	Namibia Tentou Mushi	Namibia Tentou Mushi	Unreleased	October 6, 2016	October 7, 2016	October 6, 2016	
Psyscrolr	Actos Games	Actos Games	Unreleased	April 2, 2015	Unreleased	Unreleased	
Puddle	Neko Entertainment	WW: Neko Entertainment; JP: Cosen	December 24, 2014	January 31, 2013	November 30, 2012	November 30, 2012	
Pumped BMX +	Yeah Us!	Curve Digital	Unreleased	October 1, 2015	October 1, 2015	October 1, 2015	
Pure Chess	VooFoo Studios	Ripstone	Unreleased	March 20, 2014	March 21, 2014	March 20, 2014	
Pushmo World^{NA} Pullblox World^{PAL}	Intelligent Systems; Nintendo SPD	Nintendo	June 19, 2014	June 19, 2014	June 19, 2014	June 19, 2014	
Puyo Puyo Tetris †	Sonic Team	Sega	February 6, 2014	Unreleased	Unreleased	Unreleased	
Puzzle Monkeys	Log Games	Log Games	Unreleased	February 5, 2015	Unreleased	February 19, 2015	
Quadcopter Pilot Challenge	Tacs Games	Tacs Games	Unreleased	July 2, 2015	Unreleased	Unreleased	
Q.U.B.E.: Director's Cut	Toxic Games	Grip Games	Unreleased	August 27, 2015	August 27, 2015	August 27, 2015	
Queens Garden	Joindots	Joindots	Unreleased	May 12, 2016	April 21, 2016	April 21, 2016	
Quest of Dungeons	Upfall Studios	Upfall Studios	Unreleased	September 29, 2016	September 29, 2016	September 29, 2016	
The Quiet Collection	Nostatic Software	Nostatic Software	Unreleased	July 23, 2015	December 18, 2015	September 24, 2015	
Rabbids Land †	Ubisoft Paris	Ubisoft	June 6, 2013	November 18, 2012	November 30, 2012	November 30, 2012	
Race the Sun	Flippfly	Flippfly	Unreleased	October 8, 2015	October 8, 2015	October 8, 2015	
Radiantflux: Hyperfractal	Tacs Games	Tacs Games	Unreleased	December 22, 2016	December 23, 2016	December 22, 2016	
Rainbow Snake	RandomSpin	RandomSpin	Unreleased	May 3, 2018	May 31, 2018	May 31, 2018	
Rakoo & Friends	Old Skull Games	Moving Player	Unreleased	October 15, 2015	Unreleased	October 15, 2015	
Rapala Pro Bass Fishing †	Fun Labs	Activision	Unreleased	December 4, 2012	Unreleased	Unreleased	
Rayman Legends †	Ubisoft Montpellier	WW: Ubisoft; JP: Nintendo	October 17, 2013	September 3, 2013	August 29, 2013	August 30, 2013	
Red Riding Hood	Brave Rock Games	Brave Rock Games	Unreleased	October 2, 2014	Unreleased	February 12, 2015	
Regina & Mac	Diplodocus Games	Diplodocus Games	Unreleased	January 16, 2020	January 17, 2020	January 16, 2020	
Replay: VHS is Not Dead	Neko Entertainment	Neko Entertainment	Unreleased	February 25, 2016	Unreleased	February 25, 2016	
Reptilian Rebellion	Herrero Games	FrontView Studio	Unreleased	July 14, 2016	May 5, 2016	May 5, 2016	
Resident Evil: Revelations †	Capcom	Capcom	May 23, 2013	May 21, 2013	May 23, 2013	May 24, 2013	
Retro Road Rumble	Sketchy Coyote Interactive	Sketchy Coyote Interactive	Unreleased	October 20, 2016	Unreleased	Unreleased	
Revenant Saga	Kemco	Kemco	June 6, 2017	July 6, 2017	July 6, 2017	July 6, 2017	
Reversi 32	Cragworks	Cragworks	Unreleased	Unreleased	April 28, 2022	April 28, 2022	
Rise of the Guardians: The Video Game †	Torus Games	NA: D3 Publisher; PAL: Namco Bandai Games	Unreleased	December 4, 2012	December 13, 2012	December 14, 2012	
The Rivers of Alice: Extended Version	Delirium Studios	Delirium Studios	Unreleased	October 1, 2015	Unreleased	September 24, 2015	
Rock 'N Racing Off Road	EnjoyUp Games	EnjoyUp Games	October 28, 2015	January 29, 2015	Unreleased	January 29, 2015	
Rock 'N Racing Off Road DX	EnjoyUp Games	EnjoyUp Games	Unreleased	September 17, 2015	April 7, 2016	September 24, 2015	
Rock Zombie	Quaternion Studio	EnjoyUp Games	Unreleased	October 30, 2014	Unreleased	November 20, 2014	
Rodea the Sky Soldier †	Kadokawa Games	JP: Kadokawa Games; WW: NIS America	April 2, 2015	November 10, 2015	November 19, 2015	November 13, 2015	
Romance of the Three Kingdoms 12 †	Koei Tecmo	Koei Tecmo	December 13, 2012	Unreleased	Unreleased	Unreleased	
Romance of the Three Kingdoms 12 with Power Up Kit †	Koei Tecmo	Koei Tecmo	September 26, 2013	Unreleased	Unreleased	Unreleased	
Rorrim	Nitrolic Games	Nitrolic Games	Unreleased	September 8, 2016	September 8, 2016	September 8, 2016	
Roving Rogue	Padaone Games	Padaone Games	Unreleased	July 2, 2015	Unreleased	July 2, 2015	
RTO	nuGAME	nuGAME	Unreleased	December 7, 2017	November 17, 2017	November 16, 2017	
RTO 2	nuGAME	nuGAME	Unreleased	March 1, 2018	March 2, 2018	March 1, 2018	
RTO 3	nuGAME	nuGAME	Unreleased	December 16, 2021	December 17, 2021	December 16, 2021	
Rubik's Cube	Cypronia	Cypronia	Unreleased	June 23, 2016	June 23, 2016	June 23, 2016	
Runbow †	13AM Games	13AM Games	November 25, 2015	August 27, 2015	October 23, 2015	September 3, 2015	
Runner2	Gaijin Games	Gaijin Games	September 30, 2015	February 26, 2013	August 22, 2013	April 11, 2013	
Run Run and Die	EnjoyUp Games	EnjoyUp Games	December 14, 2016	June 16, 2016	April 28, 2016	April 28, 2016	
Rush	Two Tribes	Two Tribes	Unreleased	December 12, 2013	December 20, 2013	December 12, 2013	
Rynn's Adventure: Trouble in the Enchanted Forest	Arcane Four Studios	Arcane Four Studios	Unreleased	May 26, 2016	Unreleased	Unreleased	
Ryū ga Gotoku 1&2 HD for Wii U †	Sega	Sega	August 8, 2013	Unreleased	Unreleased	Unreleased	
Sanatory Hallways	Wegenbartho	Wegenbartho	Unreleased	Unreleased	June 9, 2016	August 6, 2016	
Santa Factory	XINESS	XINESS	Unreleased	July 9, 2015	Unreleased	Unreleased	
Schlag den Star: Das Spiel	Lost The Game Studios	bitComposer	Unreleased	Unreleased	Unreleased	December 25, 2017	
Scoop! Around the World in 80 Spaces	BNC Design Studios	BNC Design Studios	Unreleased	June 13, 2019	Unreleased	Unreleased	
Scram Kitty and His Buddy on Rails	Dakko Dakko	Dakko Dakko	Unreleased	May 15, 2014	Unreleased	May 15, 2014	
Scribble	nuGAME	nuGAME	Unreleased	December 15, 2016	December 16, 2016	December 15, 2016	
Scribblenauts Unlimited †	5th Cell	NA/AU: Warner Bros. Interactive Entertainment; EU: Nintendo	Unreleased	November 18, 2012	November 30, 2012	December 6, 2013	
Scribblenauts Unmasked: A DC Comics Adventure †	5th Cell	Warner Bros. Interactive Entertainment	Unreleased	September 24, 2013	September 25, 2013	Unreleased	
Seasonal Assistant	Ultra Dolphin Revolution	Ultra Dolphin Revolution	Unreleased	January 28, 2021	January 15, 2021	January 28, 2021	
Secret Files: Tunguska	Miracle Box Games	Deep Silver	Unreleased	Unreleased	July 28, 2016	July 28, 2016	
Severed	DrinkBox Studios	DrinkBox Studios	Unreleased	September 22, 2016	September 22, 2016	September 22, 2016	
Shadow Archer	Ultra Dolphin Revolution	Ultra Dolphin Revolution	Unreleased	August 25, 2016	February 3, 2017	February 2, 2017	
Shadow Archer Special	Ultra Dolphin Revolution	Ultra Dolphin Revolution	Unreleased	August 25, 2022	August 25, 2022	August 25, 2022	
Shadow Archery	Ultra Dolphin Revolution	Ultra Dolphin Revolution	Unreleased	April 12, 2018	May 3, 2018	May 3, 2018	
Shadow Puppeteer	Sarepta Studio	Snow Cannon Games	Unreleased	January 28, 2016	January 29, 2016	January 28, 2016	
Shakedown: Hawaii †	Vblank Entertainment	Vblank Entertainment	Unreleased	August 20, 2020	Unreleased	Unreleased	
Shantae and the Pirate's Curse	WayForward Technologies; Inti Creates	WayForward Technologies	September 7, 2016	December 25, 2014	February 6, 2015	February 5, 2015	
Shantae: Half-Genie Hero †	WayForward Technologies; Inti Creates	WayForward Technologies; Xseed Games	Unreleased	September 30, 2016	December 21, 2016	December 20, 2016	
Shantae: Risky's Revenge - Director's Cut	WayForward Technologies	WayForward Technologies	March 24, 2016	March 24, 2016	March 25, 2016	March 24, 2016	
Shapes of Gray	Secret Tunnel Entertainment	Secret Tunnel Entertainment	Unreleased	May 21, 2015	Unreleased	Unreleased	
Shiftlings	Rock Pocket Games	Activision	Unreleased	June 25, 2015	June 25, 2015	June 25, 2015	
Shiny the Firefly	Stage Clear Studios; Padaone Games	Stage Clear Studios	Unreleased	November 27, 2014	Unreleased	November 27, 2014	
SHMUP Collection †	Astro Port	PixelHeart	Unreleased	Unreleased	Unreleased	May 15, 2020	
Shooting Range by Thornbury Software	Thornbury Software	Thornbury Software	Unreleased	October 21, 2016	Unreleased	Unreleased	
Shoot the Ball	RCMADIAX	WW: RCMADIAX; JP: Cosen	April 20, 2017	December 1, 2016	December 2, 2016	December 1, 2016	
Shooty Space	RCMADIAX	RCMADIAX	Unreleased	September 15, 2016	September 15, 2016	September 15, 2016	
Shovel Knight †	Yacht Club Games	WW: Yacht Club Games; JP: Nintendo	June 30, 2016	June 26, 2014	November 6, 2014	November 5, 2014	
Shut the Box	RCMADIAX	RCMADIAX	April 28, 2015	August 7, 2014	Unreleased	Unreleased	
Shutshimi	Neon Deity Games	Choice Provisions	Unreleased	February 4, 2016	April 28, 2016	April 28, 2016	
Shuttle Rush	Takusan Works	Takusan Works	Unreleased	November 6, 2014	Unreleased	Unreleased	
Silver Falls: Undertakers	Sungrand	Sungrand	Unreleased	February 16, 2023	Unreleased	Unreleased	
Silver Falls: White Inside Its Umbra	Sungrand	Sungrand	Unreleased	February 16, 2023	Unreleased	Unreleased	
Sing Party †	Nintendo SPD; FreeStyleGames	Nintendo	Unreleased	November 18, 2012	January 19, 2013	January 18, 2013	
Sinister Assistant	Ultra Dolphin Revolution	Ultra Dolphin Revolution	Unreleased	February 14, 2019	February 8, 2019	February 7, 2019	
Six Sides of the World	Dolores Entertainment	Dolores Entertainment	Unreleased	Unreleased	March 24, 2017	March 23, 2017	
Skeasy	RCMADIAX	RCMADIAX	Unreleased	January 21, 2016	Unreleased	Unreleased	
Sketch Wars	Wildcard Studios	Wildcard Studios	Unreleased	December 10, 2015	Unreleased	Unreleased	
Skorb	Stereo Chromatic	Stereo Chromatic	Unreleased	October 6, 2016	Unreleased	Unreleased	
Skunky B's Super Slots Saga #1	Skunk Software	Skunk Software	Unreleased	September 1, 2016	Unreleased	Unreleased	
Sky Force Anniversary	Infinite Dreams Inc.	Infinite Dreams Inc.	Unreleased	March 16, 2017	March 17, 2017	March 16, 2017	
Skylanders: Giants †	Vicarious Visions	Activision	Unreleased	November 18, 2012	November 30, 2012	November 30, 2012	
Skylanders: Imaginators †	Toys for Bob	Activision	Unreleased	October 16, 2016	October 13, 2016	October 14, 2016	
Skylanders: Spyro's Adventure †	Toys for Bob	Square Enix	July 12, 2013	Unreleased	Unreleased	Unreleased	
Skylanders: SuperChargers †	Vicarious Visions; Beenox	Activision	Unreleased	September 20, 2015	September 24, 2015	September 25, 2015	
Skylanders: Swap Force †	Vicarious Visions; Beenox	Activision	Unreleased	October 13, 2013	October 16, 2013	October 18, 2013	
Skylanders: Trap Team †	Toys for Bob; Beenox	Activision	Unreleased	October 5, 2014	October 2, 2014	October 10, 2014	
Slender: The Arrival	Blue Isle Studios; Parsec Productions	Midnight City	Unreleased	October 22, 2015	October 30, 2015	October 29, 2015	
Slots: Pharaoh's Riches	Skunk Software	Skunk Software	Unreleased	April 14, 2016	Unreleased	Unreleased	
Smart Adventures Mission Math: Sabotage at the Space Station	Neko Entertainment	Neko Entertainment	Unreleased	February 25, 2016	Unreleased	February 25, 2016	
The Smurfs 2 †	WayForward Technologies	Ubisoft	Unreleased	July 23, 2013	July 18, 2013	July 19, 2013	
Snake Den	Game Bytes	Game Bytes	Unreleased	November 20, 2014	Unreleased	Unreleased	
Sniper Elite V2 †	Rebellion Developments	WW: 505 Games; JP: Ubisoft	July 18, 2013	May 21, 2013	May 30, 2013	May 24, 2013	
Snowball	CRT Factory	CRT Factory	Unreleased	January 19, 2017	Unreleased	Unreleased	
Solitaire	Sanuk Games	Sanuk Games	Unreleased	October 27, 2016	October 28, 2016	October 27, 2016	
Solitaire Dungeon Escape	José Varela	José Varela	Unreleased	June 18, 2015	Unreleased	Unreleased	
Sonic & All-Stars Racing Transformed †	Sumo Digital	Sega	May 15, 2014	November 18, 2012	November 30, 2012	November 30, 2012	
Sonic Boom: Rise of Lyric †	Big Red Button	Sega	December 18, 2014	November 11, 2014	November 29, 2014	November 21, 2014	
Sonic Lost World †	Sonic Team	Sega	October 24, 2013	October 29, 2013	October 19, 2013	October 18, 2013	
Soon Shine	Dahku Creations	Dahku Creations	Unreleased	August 14, 2014	Unreleased	August 27, 2015	
Soul Axiom	Wales Interactive	Wales Interactive	Unreleased	September 29, 2016	September 29, 2016	September 29, 2016	
Space Hulk	Full Control	HR Games	Unreleased	January 14, 2016	Unreleased	February 4, 2016	
Space Hunted	Ultra Dolphin Revolution	Ultra Dolphin Revolution	Unreleased	July 6, 2017	June 29, 2017	June 29, 2017	
Space Hunted: The Lost Levels	Ultra Dolphin Revolution	Ultra Dolphin Revolution	Unreleased	February 13, 2020	February 14, 2020	February 13, 2020	
Space Intervention	VG && IG	RandomSpin	Unreleased	October 17, 2019	October 25, 2019	October 24, 2019	
SpaceRoads	Wurd Industries	Wurd Industries	Unreleased	May 5, 2016	Unreleased	Unreleased	
Spellcaster's Assistant	Ultra Dolphin Revolution	Ultra Dolphin Revolution	Unreleased	March 29, 2018	April 12, 2018	April 12, 2018	
Sphere Slice	RCMADIAX	RCMADIAX	Unreleased	June 1, 2017	June 8, 2017	June 8, 2017	
SphereZor	James Guard	James Guard	Unreleased	September 8, 2016	Unreleased	Unreleased	
Spheroids	Eclipse Games	WW: Eclipse Games; JP: Cosen	March 7, 2018	January 5, 2017	January 6, 2017	January 5, 2017	
Spikey Walls	RCMADIAX	RCMADIAX	Unreleased	September 18, 2014	Unreleased	Unreleased	
Spin the Bottle: Bumpie's Party	Redgrim	WW: KnapNok Games; JP: Rainy Frog	February 12, 2014	August 8, 2013	February 12, 2014	August 8, 2013	
Splashy Duck	RCMADIAX	RCMADIAX	Unreleased	June 23, 2016	June 23, 2016	June 23, 2016	
Splatoon †	Nintendo EAD	Nintendo	May 28, 2015	May 29, 2015	May 30, 2015	May 29, 2015	
SpongeBob SquarePants: Plankton's Robotic Revenge †	Behaviour Interactive	Activision	Unreleased	October 22, 2013	Unreleased	October 11, 2013	
Sportsball	Too DX	Too DX	Unreleased	November 6, 2014	Unreleased	Unreleased	
Spot the Differences! Party	Sanuk Games	WW: Sanuk Games; JP: Rainy Frog	January 22, 2014	September 5, 2013	Unreleased	September 5, 2013	
Spy Chameleon	EnjoyUp Games	EnjoyUp Games	Unreleased	December 25, 2014	Unreleased	December 25, 2014	
Squids Odyssey	The Game Bakers	The Game Bakers	Unreleased	May 22, 2014	May 22, 2014	May 22, 2014	
Star Fox Guard †	Nintendo EPD; PlatinumGames	Nintendo	April 21, 2016	April 22, 2016	April 23, 2016	April 22, 2016	
Star Fox Zero †	Nintendo EPD; PlatinumGames	Nintendo	April 21, 2016	April 22, 2016	April 23, 2016	April 22, 2016	
Star Ghost	Squarehead Games	Squarehead Games	Unreleased	March 10, 2016	Unreleased	March 10, 2016	
Star Sky	JMJ Interactive	JP: Rainy Frog; WW: JMJ Interactive	September 9, 2015	September 10, 2015	Unreleased	September 10, 2015	
Star Sky 2	JMJ Interactive	WW: JMJ Interactive; JP: Rainy Frog	November 30, 2016	June 23, 2016	April 14, 2016	April 14, 2016	
Star Splash: Shattered Star	Snails Arcade	Snails Animation	Unreleased	February 2, 2017	February 3, 2017	February 2, 2017	
Star Wars Pinball	Zen Studios	Zen Studios	Unreleased	July 11, 2013	July 11, 2013	July 11, 2013	
Starwhal	Breakfall	Breakfall	Unreleased	September 24, 2015	Unreleased	October 8, 2015	
Stealth Inc 2: A Game of Clones	Curve Studios	Curve Digital	Unreleased	October 30, 2014	October 31, 2014	October 30, 2014	
SteamWorld Dig †	Image & Form	Image & Form	Unreleased	August 28, 2014	August 28, 2014	August 28, 2014	
SteamWorld Heist †	Image & Form	Image & Form	Unreleased	October 20, 2016	September 30, 2016	September 30, 2016	
Steel Lords	nuGAME	nuGAME	Unreleased	July 7, 2016	June 23, 2016	June 24, 2016	
Steel Rivals	nuGAME	nuGAME	Unreleased	March 3, 2016	March 11, 2016	March 10, 2016	
Stick It To The Man!	Zoink	Ripstone	October 22, 2014	May 1, 2014	May 1, 2014	May 1, 2014	
The Stonecutter	Brave Rock Games	Brave Rock Games	Unreleased	June 4, 2015	April 13, 2017	April 13, 2017	
Stone Shire	Finger Fun Games	Finger Fun Games	Unreleased	May 21, 2015	March 25, 2016	August 27, 2015	
SturmFront: The Mutant War: Übel Edition	Carbon Fire Studio	Red Art Games	Unreleased	July 2, 2021	July 2, 2021	July 2, 2021	
Sudoku and Permudoku	Diplodocus Games	Diplodocus Games	Unreleased	May 5, 2016	July 7, 2016	July 7, 2016	
Sudoku Party	Lightwood Games	Lightwood Games	Unreleased	March 16, 2017	March 24, 2017	March 23, 2017	
Super Destronaut	Vilmos Gyokeres	Petite Games	Unreleased	March 19, 2015	Unreleased	Unreleased	
Super Destronaut 2: Go Duck Yourself	Petite Games	Petite Games	Unreleased	October 20, 2016	October 21, 2016	October 20, 2016	
Super Food Frenzy	NVriezen	NVriezen	Unreleased	Unreleased	July 15, 2021	July 15, 2021	
Super Hero Math	Skunk Software	Skunk Software	Unreleased	September 1, 2016	Unreleased	Unreleased	
Super Mario 3D World †	Nintendo EAD Tokyo; 1-Up Studio	Nintendo	November 21, 2013	November 22, 2013	November 30, 2013	November 29, 2013	
Super Mario Maker †	Nintendo EAD	Nintendo	September 10, 2015	September 11, 2015	September 12, 2015	September 11, 2015	
Super Meat Boy	BlitWorks	BlitWorks	Unreleased	May 12, 2016	May 12, 2016	May 12, 2016	
Super Robo Mouse	RCMADIAX	RCMADIAX	July 20, 2016	April 7, 2016	April 7, 2016	April 7, 2016	
Super Smash Bros. for Wii U †	Bandai Namco Studios; Sora Ltd.	Nintendo	December 6, 2014	November 21, 2014	November 29, 2014	November 28, 2014	
Super Toy Cars	Eclipse Games	Eclipse Games	April 8, 2015	July 24, 2014	Unreleased	July 24, 2014	
Super Ultra Star Shooter	Ultra Dolphin Revolution	Ultra Dolphin Revolution	Unreleased	September 28, 2017	September 21, 2017	September 21, 2017	
Surfin' Sam: Attack of the Aqualites	Slyon Studios	Slyon Studios	Unreleased	August 11, 2016	Unreleased	Unreleased	
Suspension Railroad Simulator	Joindots	Joindots	Unreleased	April 23, 2015	Unreleased	March 26, 2015	
Swap Blocks	WizByte Games	WizByte Games	Unreleased	June 1, 2017	October 20, 2017	October 19, 2017	
Swap Fire	Midnight Status	Midnight Status	Unreleased	November 18, 2016	Unreleased	Unreleased	
The Swapper	Curve Studios	WW: Curve Digital; JP: Nintendo	April 2, 2015	November 6, 2014	November 7, 2014	November 6, 2014	
Sweetest Thing	Joindots	Joindots	Unreleased	May 19, 2016	May 5, 2016	May 5, 2016	
The Swindle	Carbon Games	Curve Digital	Unreleased	September 10, 2015	September 10, 2015	September 10, 2015	
Swords & Soldiers	Two Tribes	WW: Two Tribes; JP: Nintendo	November 23, 2015	May 22, 2014	May 22, 2014	May 22, 2014	
Swords & Soldiers II	Ronimo Games	WW: Ronimo Games; JP: Nintendo	December 9, 2015	May 21, 2015	May 21, 2015	May 21, 2015	
Tabletop Gallery	RCMADIAX	RCMADIAX	April 28, 2015	January 7, 2016	Unreleased	April 16, 2015	
Tachyon Project	Eclipse Games	Eclipse Games	August 23, 2017	May 12, 2016	April 1, 2016	March 31, 2016	
Tadpole Treble	Bitfinity	Bitfinity	Unreleased	August 11, 2016	Unreleased	Unreleased	
Taiko no Tatsujin: Atsumete ☆ Tomodachi Daisakusen! †	Bandai Namco Studios	Bandai Namco Entertainment	November 26, 2015	Unreleased	Unreleased	Unreleased	
Taiko no Tatsujin: Tokumori! †	Bandai Namco Studios	Bandai Namco Games	November 20, 2014	Unreleased	Unreleased	Unreleased	
Taiko no Tatsujin: Wii U Version †	Namco Bandai Studios	Namco Bandai Games	November 21, 2013	Unreleased	Unreleased	Unreleased	
Tallowmere	Chris McFarland	NA: Chris McFarland; JP: Teyon	August 2, 2017	September 1, 2016	Unreleased	Unreleased	
Tank! Tank! Tank! †	Namco Bandai Games	Namco Bandai Games	December 26, 2012	November 18, 2012	November 30, 2012	November 30, 2012	
Tap Tap Arcade	RCMADIAX	RCMADIAX	Unreleased	February 18, 2016	April 28, 2016	April 28, 2016	
Tap Tap Arcade 2	RCMADIAX	RCMADIAX	Unreleased	July 7, 2016	July 7, 2016	July 7, 2016	
Tekken Tag Tournament 2: Wii U Edition †	Namco Bandai Games	Namco Bandai Games	December 8, 2012	November 18, 2012	November 30, 2012	November 30, 2012	
Temple of Yog	ChudChud Industries	ChudChud Industries	Unreleased	December 16, 2015	January 8, 2016	January 7, 2016	
Tengami	Nyamyam	Nyamyam	Unreleased	November 13, 2014	November 14, 2014	November 13, 2014	
Terraria †	Engine Software	WW: 505 Games; JP: Spike Chunsoft	September 15, 2016	June 28, 2016	June 23, 2016	June 24, 2016	
Teslagrad †	Rain Games	Rain Games	March 11, 2015	September 11, 2014	September 11, 2014	September 11, 2014	
Teslapunk	klutzGames	klutzGames	January 25, 2017	December 8, 2016	December 16, 2016	December 15, 2016	
Test Your Mind	XenoHorizon	XenoHorizon	Unreleased	November 12, 2015	Unreleased	December 15, 2016	
Tested with Robots!	M.R. Games	M.R. Games	Unreleased	Unreleased	Unreleased	December 11, 2014	
Tetrobot and Co.	Swing Swing Submarine	WW: Neko Entertainment; JP: Beyond Interactive	July 22, 2015	October 30, 2014	Unreleased	October 30, 2014	
Tetraminos	Sanuk Games	Sanuk Games	Unreleased	September 8, 2016	September 1, 2016	September 1, 2016	
Thomas Was Alone	Mike Bithell	Curve Digital	Unreleased	November 25, 2014	November 26, 2014	November 25, 2014	
Tilelicious: Delicious Tiles	BattleLine Games	BattleLine Games	Unreleased	April 16, 2015	Unreleased	Unreleased	
Tiny Galaxy!	Arcane Pixel Games	Arcane Pixel Games	Unreleased	July 16, 2015	Unreleased	Unreleased	
Tiny Thief	Abylight	Nintendo	November 13, 2015	Unreleased	Unreleased	Unreleased	
Titans Tower	RCMADIAX	RCMADIAX	Unreleased	September 22, 2016	September 22, 2016	September 22, 2016	
TNT Racers: Nitro Machines Edition	Keen Games	Keen Games	Unreleased	October 3, 2013	September 5, 2013	September 5, 2013	
Toby: The Secret Mine	Lukas Navratil	Headup Games	Unreleased	January 19, 2017	January 20, 2017	January 19, 2017	
Togabito no Senritsu	Kemco	Kemco	October 2, 2013	Unreleased	Unreleased	Unreleased	
Toki Tori	Two Tribes	Two Tribes	Unreleased	November 7, 2013	November 7, 2013	November 7, 2013	
Toki Tori 2+	Two Tribes	WW: Two Tribes; JP: Rainy Frog	September 3, 2014	April 4, 2013	April 4, 2013	April 4, 2013	
Tomeling in Trouble	HullBreach Studios	HullBreach Studios	Unreleased	November 2, 2017	Unreleased	Unreleased	
Tokyo Mirage Sessions ♯FE †	Atlus	Nintendo	December 26, 2015	June 24, 2016	June 25, 2016	June 24, 2016	
Tom Clancy's Splinter Cell: Blacklist †	Ubisoft Shanghai	Ubisoft	September 5, 2013	August 20, 2013	August 22, 2013	August 23, 2013	
Toon Tanks	Petite Games	Petite Games	Unreleased	December 25, 2014	July 21, 2016	July 21, 2016	
Toon War	Lemondo Games	Lemondo Games	Unreleased	February 1, 2018	March 16, 2018	March 15, 2018	
TorqueL	Full Power Side Attack	Full Power Side Attack	November 9, 2016	Unreleased	Unreleased	Unreleased	
Toss n Go	RCMADIAX	RCMADIAX	April 28, 2015	December 18, 2014	Unreleased	Unreleased	
Totem Topple	Crystalline Green	Crystalline Green	Unreleased	November 19, 2015	June 2, 2016	November 19, 2015	
Toto Temple Deluxe	Juicy Beast Studio	Juicy Beast Studio	Unreleased	October 1, 2015	Unreleased	October 1, 2015	
Touch Battle Tank SP	SilverStar	SilverStar	July 30, 2014	Unreleased	Unreleased	Unreleased	
Touch Selections	RCMADIAX	RCMADIAX	Unreleased	September 8, 2016	September 8, 2016	September 8, 2016	
Transformers: Prime – The Game †	Now Production	Activision	Unreleased	November 18, 2012	November 30, 2012	November 30, 2012	
Transformers: Rise of the Dark Spark †	Edge of Reality	Activision	Unreleased	June 24, 2014	June 25, 2014	June 27, 2014	
Trine 2: Director's Cut	Frozenbyte	WW: Frozenbyte; JP: Nintendo	January 22, 2014	November 18, 2012	February 1, 2013	November 30, 2012	
Trine: Enchanted Edition	Frozenbyte	Frozenbyte	Unreleased	March 12, 2015	March 27, 2015	March 26, 2015	
Tri-Strip	Sc0tt Games	Form Up Studios	Unreleased	February 5, 2015	Unreleased	Unreleased	
Triple Breakout	nuGAME	nuGAME	Unreleased	May 4, 2017	Unreleased	May 4, 2017	
Tumblestone †	The Quantum Astrophysicists Guild	The Quantum Astrophysicists Guild	Unreleased	July 12, 2016	July 12, 2016	July 12, 2016	
Turbo: Super Stunt Squad †	Monkey Bar Games	NA: D3 Publisher; PAL: Namco Bandai Games	Unreleased	July 16, 2013	September 12, 2013	October 11, 2013	
Turtle Tale	Saturnine Games	Saturnine Games	Unreleased	October 9, 2014	February 5, 2016	October 9, 2014	
Twin Robots	Ratalaika Games	Ratalaika Games	Unreleased	June 16, 2016	June 16, 2016	June 16, 2016	
Twisted Fusion	Leuvision	Leuvision	Unreleased	November 3, 2016	November 4, 2016	November 3, 2016	
Typoman	Brainseed Factory	Headup Games	Unreleased	November 19, 2015	November 20, 2015	November 19, 2015	
U Host	Bear Box Media	Bear Box Media	Unreleased	March 17, 2016	March 4, 2016	March 3, 2016	
Ultratron	Puppygames	Curve Digital	Unreleased	May 14, 2015	May 14, 2015	May 14, 2015	
Unalive	RandomSpin	RandomSpin	Unreleased	April 26, 2018	Unreleased	May 10, 2018	
Underground	Grendel Games	Grendel Games	Unreleased	April 2, 2015	Unreleased	January 8, 2015	
Unepic	EnjoyUp Games	EnjoyUp Games	Unreleased	January 16, 2014	Unreleased	January 23, 2014	
Use Your Words	Smiling Buddha Games	Screenwave Media	Unreleased	April 27, 2017	April 27, 2017	April 27, 2017	
uWordsmith	ChudChud Industries	ChudChud Industries	Unreleased	January 15, 2015	Unreleased	Unreleased	
Vaccine	Rainy Night Creations	Rainy Night Creations	May 31, 2017	February 23, 2017	Unreleased	February 23, 2017	
Vector Assault	WizByte Games	WizByte Games	Unreleased	May 21, 2015	Unreleased	Unreleased	
Vektor Wars	Super Icon	Super Icon	Unreleased	July 28, 2016	September 8, 2016	September 8, 2016	
The Voice: I Want You †	Zoë Mode	Activision	Unreleased	October 21, 2014	Unreleased	Unreleased	
Volcanic Field 2	Slyon Studios	Slyon Studios	Unreleased	February 25, 2016	Unreleased	Unreleased	
Volgarr the Viking	Crazy Viking Studios	Crazy Viking Studios	Unreleased	October 12, 2017	October 6, 2017	October 5, 2017	
VRog	ByteRockers’ Games	ByteRockers’ Games	Unreleased	March 16, 2017	October 7, 2016	October 6, 2016	
The Walking Dead: Survival Instinct †	Terminal Reality	Activision	Unreleased	March 19, 2013	Unreleased	March 22, 2013	
Wall Ball	RCMADIAX	RCMADIAX	Unreleased	February 16, 2017	Unreleased	February 23, 2017	
Warriors Orochi 3 Hyper †	Omega Force	Tecmo Koei	December 8, 2012	November 18, 2012	November 30, 2012	November 30, 2012	
Watch Dogs †	Ubisoft Montreal	Ubisoft	December 4, 2014	November 18, 2014	November 20, 2014	November 21, 2014	
Wheel of Fortune †	Pipeworks Software	THQ	Unreleased	December 14, 2012	Unreleased	Unreleased	
Whispering Willows	Night Light Interactive	Akupara Games	Unreleased	January 20, 2020	Unreleased	October 8, 2015	
Wicked Monsters Blast! HD Plus	Corecell Technology	PQube	Unreleased	January 14, 2016	Unreleased	October 15, 2015	
Wii Fit U †	Nintendo EAD; Ganbarion	Nintendo	October 31, 2013	November 1, 2013	November 2, 2013	November 1, 2013	
Wii Karaoke U †	Xing	Nintendo	December 8, 2012	Unreleased	Unreleased	October 4, 2013	
Wii Party U †	NDcube; Nintendo SPD	Nintendo	October 31, 2013	October 25, 2013	October 26, 2013	October 25, 2013	
Wii Sports Club †	Bandai Namco Studios; Nintendo EAD	Nintendo	October 30, 2013	November 7, 2013	November 7, 2013	November 7, 2013	
Wind-up Knight 2	Robot Invader	Robot Invader	April 28, 2015	August 13, 2015	Unreleased	Unreleased	
Wings of Magloryx	Arbelos Interactive	Arbelos Interactive	Unreleased	September 22, 2016	Unreleased	Unreleased	
WinKings	Lemondo Games	Lemondo Games	Unreleased	May 4, 2017	May 11, 2017	May 11, 2017	
Wipeout 3 †	Behaviour Interactive	Activision	Unreleased	November 18, 2012	Unreleased	Unreleased	
Wipeout: Create & Crash †	Behaviour Interactive	Activision	Unreleased	October 15, 2013	Unreleased	Unreleased	
Woah Dave!	MiniVisions	Choice Provisions	Unreleased	August 20, 2015	Unreleased	Unreleased	
The Wonderful 101 †	PlatinumGames	Nintendo	August 24, 2013	September 15, 2013	August 24, 2013	August 23, 2013	
Wooden Sen'SeY	Upper Byte	Neko Entertainment	January 21, 2015	July 24, 2014	Unreleased	July 24, 2014	
Word Party	Lightwood Games	Lightwood Games	Unreleased	November 12, 2015	December 18, 2015	November 12, 2015	
Word Logic by Powgi	Lightwood Games	Lightwood Games	Unreleased	August 18, 2016	August 18, 2016	August 18, 2016	
Word Puzzles by Powgi	Lightwood Games	Lightwood Games	Unreleased	February 11, 2016	January 29, 2016	January 28, 2016	
Word Search by Powgi	Lightwood Games	Lightwood Games	Unreleased	April 16, 2015	December 18, 2015	April 16, 2015	
WordsUp! Academy	CoderChild	CoderChild	Unreleased	February 9, 2017	Unreleased	February 9, 2017	
A World of Keflings	NinjaBee	NinjaBee	Unreleased	November 13, 2014	Unreleased	November 13, 2014	
Xavier	Prison Lab	Prison Lab	Unreleased	November 13, 2014	Unreleased	Unreleased	
Xenoblade Chronicles X †	Monolith Soft; Nintendo SPD	Nintendo	April 29, 2015	December 4, 2015	December 5, 2015	December 4, 2015	
Xeodrifter	Renegade Kid	Renegade Kid	Unreleased	July 30, 2015	Unreleased	Unreleased	
XType Plus	PhobosLab	PhobosLab	January 7, 2015	August 14, 2014	July 31, 2014	July 31, 2014	
Y.A.S.G	LSA Games	LSA Games	Unreleased	February 9, 2017	April 6, 2017	April 6, 2017	
Yakuman Hō-ō	Nintendo	Nintendo	February 18, 2015	Unreleased	Unreleased	Unreleased	
Year Walk	Dakko Dakko	WW: Simogo; JP: Nintendo	November 23, 2015	September 17, 2015	September 17, 2015	September 17, 2015	
Yo-kai Watch Dance: Just Dance Special Version †	Ubisoft Paris; Ubisoft Reflections; Ubisoft Montpellier; Ubisoft Bucharest; Ubisoft Milan; Ubisoft Pune; Level-5	Nintendo; Level-5	December 5, 2015	Unreleased	Unreleased	Unreleased	
Yoshi's Woolly World †	Good-Feel	Nintendo	July 16, 2015	October 16, 2015	June 25, 2015	June 26, 2015	
Your Shape: Fitness Evolved 2013 †	Blue Byte	Ubisoft	Unreleased	November 18, 2012	November 30, 2012	November 30, 2012	
ZaciSa's Last Stand	ZeNfA Productions	ZeNfA Productions	Unreleased	July 3, 2014	January 8, 2016	August 20, 2015	
Zen Pinball 2	Zen Studios	Zen Studios	Unreleased	March 21, 2013	January 31, 2013	January 31, 2013	
Ziggurat	Milkstone Studios	Milkstone Studios	Unreleased	August 18, 2016	June 30, 2016	June 30, 2016	
Zombeer	Padaone Games	Padaone Games	Unreleased	April 13, 2017	Unreleased	Unreleased	
Zombie Brigade: No Brain No Gain	Cypronia	Cypronia	Unreleased	January 5, 2017	December 23, 2016	December 22, 2016	
Zombie Defense	Teyon	Teyon	August 5, 2015	September 17, 2015	Unreleased	September 3, 2015	
ZombiU †	Ubisoft Montpellier	Ubisoft	December 8, 2012	November 18, 2012	November 30, 2012	November 30, 2012	
Zumba Fitness: World Party †	Zoë Mode	WW: Majesco; JP: Hamster Corporation	October 23, 2014	November 5, 2013	November 22, 2013	November 22, 2013	

== List of Off-TV Play compatible games ==
Off-TV Play is a feature of Nintendo's eighth-generation video game console, the Wii U. Like all video game consoles, the Wii U uses a console and a controller to manipulate an image on a television screen. The Wii U's unique feature is that its controller, the Wii U GamePad, has its own built-in screen for displaying images. It can display an entirely different image, or duplicate the television screen into the Wii U GamePad. It also allowed for 2-Player multiplayer, where each person would have their own screen with no need for Co-op splitscreen. Off-TV Play is the term used for when an entire game is played strictly on the controller, without the use of a television. The GamePad also features two speakers that can be used for Off-TV Play. There is no standardized way to activate Off-TV Play and how it's implemented depends on the game.

For supported games, a television isn't required to be connected to the Wii U; the Wii U can operate in Off-TV Play mode as long as the console is connected to a power source. However, as the processing is done on the console, and transmitted to the GamePad, the user must still keep within the transmitting range for it to work. Not all games support Off-TV Play, as some games conceptually rely on the asymmetric interplay between the television screen and the Wii U GamePad screen, such as Nintendo Land and ZombiU. However, all Wii U Virtual Console titles purchased from the Nintendo eShop include the option to use Off-TV Play. Original Wii games and Wii Virtual Console games were not initially compatible either, although this was changed in the Wii U's September 30, 2013 system update, which allows it, but only through the use of original Wii peripherals as input methods, meaning that the image would appear on Wii U GamePad screen, but its buttons would not work, requiring the use of Wii Remotes and Wii accessories for button and joystick input. This was partially revised again in January 2015; when Nintendo began releasing Wii games digitally on the Wii U eShop. Because games re-released in this fashion were reworked to run straight from the Wii U operating screen, and not Wii Mode, the game allowed for Off-TV Play on Wii games with GamePad controls, provided the game allowed for Classic Controller usage in its Wii release.

Title	Genre	Developer	Publisher	Availability	Ref.
The Amazing Spider-Man: Ultimate Edition	Action-adventure	Beenox	Activision	^{NA, EU}	
The Amazing Spider-Man 2	Action-adventure	Beenox	Activision	^{NA, EU}	
Angry Birds Trilogy	Puzzle	Rovio Entertainment	Activision	^{NA, EU}	
Armillo	Action-adventure	Fuzzy Wuzzy Games	Fuzzy Wuzzy Games	^{NA}	
Assassin's Creed III	Action-adventure	Ubisoft Quebec	Ubisoft	^{AUS, EU, NA, JP}	
Assassin's Creed IV: Black Flag	Action-adventure	Ubisoft Quebec	Ubisoft	^{AUS, EU, NA, JP}	
Batman: Arkham City Armored Edition	Action-adventure	WB Games Montréal	Warner Bros. Interactive	^{AUS, EU, NA, JP}	
Batman: Arkham Origins	Action-adventure	WB Games Montréal	Warner Bros. Interactive	^{AUS, EU, NA, JP}	
Batman: Arkham Origins Blackgate – Deluxe Edition	Action-adventure	Armature Studio	Warner Bros. Interactive Entertainment	^{EU, NA}	
Bayonetta	Action, hack and slash	PlatinumGames	Nintendo	^{AUS, EU, NA, JP}	
Bayonetta 2	Action, hack and slash	PlatinumGames	Nintendo	^{AUS, EU, NA, JP}	
Ben 10: Omniverse	Action-adventure	D3 Publisher	D3 Publisher	^{AUS, EU, NA}	^{[a]}
Bit.Trip Presents... Runner2: Future Legend of Rhythm Alien	Platformer	Gaijin Games	Gaijin Games	^{AUS, EU, NA}	
Bombing Bastards	Action	Sanuk Games	Sanuk Games	^{NA}	
Call of Duty: Black Ops II	First-person shooter	Treyarch	Activision	^{AUS, EU, NA, JP}	
Call of Duty: Ghosts	First-person shooter	Infinity Ward	Activision	^{AUS, EU, NA, JP}	
Captain Toad: Treasure Tracker	Puzzle	Nintendo EAD Tokyo, 1-Up Studio	Nintendo	^{AUS, EU, NA, JP}	
Cars 3: Driven to Win	Racing	Avalanche Software	Warner Bros. Interactive Entertainment	^{AUS, EU, NA}	
Castlestorm	Puzzle, strategy	Zen Studios	Zen Studios	^{AUS, EU, NA}	
Chasing Aurora	Other	Broken Rules	Broken Rules	^{AUS, EU, NA}	
Child of Light	Platformer, role-playing	Ubisoft Montreal	Ubisoft	^{AUS, EU, NA, JP}	
Cloudberry Kingdom	Platformer	Pwnee Studios	Ubisoft	^{AUS, EU, NA}	
Darksiders II	Action-adventure	Vigil Games	THQ	^{AUS, NA, EU}	
Deus Ex: Human Revolution Director's Cut	Action role-playing, First-person shooter, stealth	Straight Right	Square Enix	^{AUS, EU, NA}	
Disney Infinity	Platformer, sandbox	Avalanche Software	Disney Interactive Studios	^{AUS, EU, NA}	
Disney's Planes	Amateur flight simulation	Behaviour Interactive	Disney Interactive Studios	^{AUS, EU, NA}	
Don't Starve: Giant Edition	Action-adventure	Klei Entertainment	Klei Entertainment	^{EU, NA}	
Donkey Kong Country: Tropical Freeze	Platformer	Retro Studios	Nintendo	^{AUS, EU, NA, JP}	
Dr. Luigi	Puzzle	Nintendo SPD, Arika	Nintendo	^{NA, EU, JP}	
Dragon Quest X	MMORPG	Square Enix, Armor Project	Square Enix	^{JP}	
DuckTales: Remastered	Platformer	Capcom, WayForward Technologies	Capcom, Disney Interactive Studios	^{AUS, EU, NA}	
Dungeons & Dragons: Chronicles of Mystara	Beat 'em up, action role-playing	Iron Galaxy Studios	Capcom	^{NA, EU}	
Edge	Puzzle, action	Two Tribes	Two Tribes	^{AUS, EU, NA}	
FIFA Soccer 13	Sports	EA Canada	EA Sports	^{AUS, EU, NA, JP}	
Gaiabreaker	Shoot 'em up	Ubiquitous Entertainment	Ubiquitous Entertainment	^{JP}	
Giana Sisters: Twisted Dreams	Platformer	Black Forest Games	Black Forest Games	^{AUS, EU}	
Guacamelee!: Super Turbo Championship Edition	Platformer, beat 'em up	DrinkBox Studios	DrinkBox Studios	^{EU, NA}	
Hyrule Warriors	Action, hack and slash	Omega Force, Team Ninja	Nintendo, Tecmo Koei	^{AUS, EU, NA, JP}	
Just Dance 4	Rhythm	Ubisoft Paris, Ubisoft Reflections, Ubisoft Bucharest, Ubisoft Pune, Ubisoft Milan	Ubisoft	^{AUS, EU, NA}	
Kirby and the Rainbow Curse	Platformer	HAL Laboratory, Nintendo SPD	Nintendo	^{AUS, EU, NA, JP}	
The Legend of Zelda: Breath of the Wild	Action-adventure	Nintendo EPD	Nintendo	^{AUS, EU, NA, JP}	
The Legend of Zelda: The Wind Waker HD	Action-adventure	Nintendo EAD Group No. 3	Nintendo	^{AUS, EU, NA, JP}	
The Legend of Zelda: Twilight Princess HD	Action-adventure	Nintendo EPD	Nintendo	^{AUS, EU, NA, JP}	
Lego Batman 2: DC Super Heroes	Action-adventure	Traveller's Tales	Warner Bros. Interactive	^{AUS, EU, NA}	
Lego Marvel Super Heroes	Action-adventure	Traveller's Tales	Warner Bros. Interactive	^{AUS, EU, NA}	
The Lego Movie Videogame	Action-adventure	TT Games, TT Fusion	Warner Bros. Interactive	^{AUS, EU, NA}	
Little Inferno	Puzzle	Tomorrow Corporation	Tomorrow Corporation	^{AUS, EU, NA}	
Madden NFL 13	Sports	EA Tiburon	EA Sports	^{NA}	^{[b]}
Mario Kart 8	Racing	Nintendo EAD Group No. 1	Nintendo	^{AUS, EU, NA, JP}	
Mass Effect 3: Special Edition	Action role-playing	Straight Right	Electronic Arts	^{AUS, EU, NA, JP}	
Mighty Switch Force!: Hyper Drive Edition	Platformer	WayForward Technologies	WayForward Technologies	^{AUS, EU, NA}	
Mighty Switch Force! 2	Platformer	WayForward Technologies	WayForward Technologies	^{AUS, EU, NA}	
Minecraft: Wii U Edition	Sandbox	4J Studios, Mojang	Microsoft	^{JP, EU, NA}	
Monster Hunter 3 Ultimate	Action role-playing	Capcom Production Studio 1, Eighting	Capcom	^{AUS, EU, NA, JP}	^{[c]}
Mutant Mudds Deluxe	Run and gun, platformer	Renegade Kid	Renegade Kid	^{NA}	
Nano Assault Neo	Shooter	Shin'en Multimedia	Shin'en Multimedia	^{AUS, EU, NA, JP}	
NBA 2K13	Sports	2K Sports	2K Sports	^{AUS, EU, NA}	
Need for Speed: Most Wanted U	Racing	Criterion Games	Electronic Arts	^{AUS, EU, NA, JP}	
NES Remix	Action, arcade	indieszero	Nintendo	^{AUS, EU, NA, JP}	
NES Remix 2	Action, arcade	indieszero	Nintendo	^{AUS, EU, NA, JP}	
New Super Mario Bros. U	Platformer	Nintendo EAD Group No. 4	Nintendo	^{AUS, EU, NA, JP}	^{[d]}
New Super Luigi U	Platformer	Nintendo EAD Group No. 4	Nintendo	^{AUS, EU, NA, JP}	
Ninja Gaiden 3: Razor's Edge	Action-adventure, hack and slash	Team Ninja	Nintendo	^{AUS, EU, NA, JP}	
One Piece: Unlimited World Red	Action-adventure	Ganbarion	Bandai Namco Games	^{AUS, EU, NA, JP}	
Pac-Man and the Ghostly Adventures	Platformer	Monkey Bar Games	Bandai Namco Games	^{AUS, EU, NA}	
Pikmin 3	Real-time strategy	Nintendo EAD Group No. 4	Nintendo	^{AUS, EU, NA, JP}	
Ping 1.5+	Puzzle	Nami Tentou Mushi	Nami Tentou Mushi	^{EU, NA}	
Pokkén Tournament	Fighting	Bandai Namco	The Pokémon Company	^{NA, JP}	
Pokémon Rumble U	Action role-playing	Ambrella	Nintendo	^{AUS, EU, NA, JP}	
Puddle	Puzzle	Neko Entertainment	Neko Entertainment	^{AUS, EU, NA}	
Pushmo World	Puzzle	Intelligent Systems	Nintendo	^{AUS, EU, NA, JP}	
Rayman Legends	Platformer	Ubisoft Montpellier	Ubisoft	^{AUS, EU, NA, JP}	
Resident Evil: Revelations	Survival horror	Capcom, Tose	Capcom	^{AUS, EU, NA, JP}	
Rush	Puzzle	Two Tribes	Two Tribes	^{AUS, EU, NA}	
Scribblenauts Unlimited	Puzzle	5th Cell	Nintendo	EU	
Scribblenauts Unmasked: A DC Comics Adventure	Puzzle	5th Cell	Warner Bros. Interactive	^{AUS, EU, NA}	
SDK Paint	Art application	HullBreach Studios	HullBreach Studios	^{NA}	
Shovel Knight	Platformer	Yacht Club Games	Yacht Club Games	^{EU, NA}	
Skylanders: Giants	Platformer	Vicarious Visions	Activision	^{AUS, EU, NA}	
Skylanders: Spyro's Adventure	Platformer	Toys for Bob	Activision	^{JP}	
Sniper Elite V2	Tactical shooter	Rebellion Developments	505 Games	^{AUS, EU, NA, JP}	
Sonic & All-Stars Racing Transformed	Racing	Sumo Digital	Sega	^{AUS, EU, NA, JP}	^{[e]}
Sonic Boom: Rise of Lyric	Action-adventure	Big Red Button Entertainment	Sega	^{AUS, EU, NA}	
Sonic Lost World	Platformer	Sonic Team	Sega, Nintendo	^{AUS, EU, NA, JP}	
Super Mario 3D World	Platformer	Nintendo EAD Tokyo	Nintendo	^{AUS, EU, NA, JP}	
Super Smash Bros. for Wii U	Fighting	Sora Ltd. and Bandai Namco Games	Nintendo	^{AUS, EU, NA, JP}	
Tekken Tag Tournament 2: Wii U Edition	Fighting	Namco Bandai	Namco Bandai	^{AUS, EU, NA, JP}	
Toki Tori	Puzzle	Two Tribes	Two Tribes	^{AUS, EU, NA}	
Toki Tori 2+	Puzzle	Two Tribes	Two Tribes	^{AUS, EU, NA}	
Tom Clancy's Splinter Cell: Blacklist	Stealth, action-adventure	Ubisoft Shanghai	Ubisoft	^{AUS, EU, NA, JP}	
Trine 2: Director's Cut	Puzzle	Frozenbyte	Frozenbyte	^{AUS, EU, NA}	
Unepic	Platformer, role-playing	Francisco Téllez de Meneses	EnjoyUp Games	^{EU, NA}	
Watch Dogs	Action-adventure	Ubisoft Bucharest	Ubisoft	^{AUS, EU, NA, JP}	
Wii Fit U	Fitness	Nintendo EAD Group No. 5, Ganbarion	Nintendo	^{AUS, EU, NA, JP}	^{[f]}
The Wonderful 101	Action	PlatinumGames	Nintendo	^{AUS, EU, NA, JP}	
Xenoblade Chronicles X	Role-playing video game	Monolith Soft	Nintendo	^{NA, EU, JP}	
Yakuza 1 & 2 HD Collection	Action-adventure	Sega	Sega	^{JP}	
Zen Pinball 2	Pinball	Zen Studios	Zen Studios	^{AUS, EU, NA}	

^[a]Off-TV Play must be initially activated via a menu on the TV screen.

^[b]Off-TV Play cannot be activated or disabled mid-game

^[c]An update is required to use Off-TV Play.

^[d]When using the feature in multiplayer mode, only platforms can be placed using the Wii U GamePad's touchscreen and a Wii Remote and/or Wii U Pro Controller is required.

^[e]Off-TV Play is activated by swiping down on touchscreen.

^[f]Some activities require both the GamePad and TV screen and are not compatible with Off-TV Play.
