= Cube Life: Island Survival =

2015 video game

- Artwork of the HD remake
- Developer: Cypronia
- Publisher: Cypronia
- Platforms: Wii U HD remake Android, Steam, Nintendo Switch, PlayStation 4
- Release: Wii U: NA: June 4, 2015; EU: June 25, 2015; JP: February 3, 2016; Steam: WW: April 20, 2018; Android: WW: August 8, 2018; Switch: WW: December 26, 2020; PS4: WW: February 8, 2021
- Genres: Open world, sandbox, survival
- Modes: Single-player, multiplayer (Note: Wii U version only)

Cube Life: Island Survival is an indie open world sandbox survival game developed and published by Cypronia. Originally released for the Wii U in June 2015, an HD remake was released on Steam in April 2018, on Android and iOS in August 2018, and for the Nintendo Switch in December 2020.

Cube Life was one of the first sandbox video games released for the Wii U. This has been seen as a niche in the market and is sometimes regarded as one of the main reasons for its relatively large success for an indie Minecraft clone. In 2015, it reached #1 on the European, #2 in the American and #3 in the Japanese Nintendo eShop charts.

== Gameplay ==
Cube Life: Island Survival features three game modes: Survival Mode, Creative Mode, and Multiplayer Mode.

In Survival Mode, the player controls a man named Barry who is stranded on a desert island after a shipwreck. The player maintains Barry's health and explores the game world, which consists of several islands, in order to eventually kill the various bosses, such as a giant spider. At night, cannibals appear on most islands whose aim is to kill the player. Experience is gained for almost every action in the game (running, fighting, adding and removing blocks, etc.). If one has gained enough experience, the player level increases. The game also contains an Internet ranking list on which the players with the highest levels are listed. In contrast to Minecraft, the game world is not generated randomly, but rather given by the developers; each player starts on the same island. The game world is more than four times the size of Minecraft: Wii U Edition.

In Creative Mode, the player has access to all objects except items in the game, and can create original maps with them, which, since version 1.2, can be shared with other players.

In the local multiplayer mode, which is only available in the original Wii U version, two players can compete against each other in different modes such as Deathmatch, Tower Defense and Co-op. They can create maps together in creative mode.

== Development ==
=== Background ===
Mojang's popular sandbox title Minecraft, which saw its first console outing on the Xbox 360 in 2012, was not officially announced for the Wii U until December 2015. Prior to this, Microsoft wholly acquired Mojang in September 2014. At the time, Minecraft was already either available or announced for most major platforms except Nintendo's. Following the acquisition, many gaming news outlets expressed skepticism that Minecraft would arrive on any Nintendo platform, let alone Wii U. However, later that same month, startup developer Nexis Games announced their own sandbox title UCraft for the Wii U. According to Nintendo Life, UCraft is regarded as very similar in both graphical aesthetic and gameplay to Minecraft, and likely "could fulfil a key gap in the market on the Wii U." Due to Nexis Games' poor track record, and following the sketchy development of UCraft, other indie developers decided to follow suit and release their own iterations of Minecraft-inspired titles for Nintendo platforms. One of those developers was Cypronia.

=== Announcement and release ===
Cypronia announced Cube Life: Island Survival in January 2015 with a release date later that year, promising that the "goal is [to] create the best block building open-world sandbox game for Nintendo platforms." Cypronia emphasized they would continue to update the game throughout 2015 and beyond, improving the game based on consumer feedback via Miiverse, Facebook, Twitter and various online community forums, such as on their official website. Cypronia was keen on distancing Cube Life: Island Survival from being defined as a Minecraft clone.

In May 2015, Cypronia announced the game would be available in both North America and Europe the following month. Cypronia CEO Stefan Pavelka was confident that their title has a lot to offer, claiming, "If we compare the game to competitors, other Wii U games of that genre, we will offer much more fun and greater value, either by means of lower price or by providing more content and features." The game had a promotional discount during launch period.

=== Updates ===
In Version 1.1, local multiplayer mode was added. Version 1.2 made it possible to share maps from Creative Mode with other players and also added new areas, animals, pets, defeatable game antagonists and a smarter AI for the cannibals. In addition, the world was enlarged from 2,880 x 2,880 to 3,520 x 3,520 blocks. With Version 1.3, a skin editor and a sorting by friends in the internet ranking list was added.

=== HD remake ===
With Cube Life: Island Survival becoming very popular on the Wii U, Cypronia announced Cube Life: Island Survival HD, which they described as a special edition of the original game. Though the original game did run in full 1080p HD, the remaster would be in 4K (except for the Nintendo Switch version). The HD remake does not include the Internet ranking list or multiplayer mode.

On April 20, 2018 at 17:57:05 UTC, Cube Life: Island Survival HD made its way into the Steam store under the same name as the original game. On 27 June 2018, the game was also made available for MacOS. On August 8, 2018 the game was also released on Android and iOS for their primary app stores Google Play and Apple App Store as a free-to-play title with in-app purchases. The game was scheduled to be released for Nintendo Switch, PlayStation 4 and Xbox One in November 2019, although it was not released then. It was released on December 26, 2020 on Nintendo Switch via the Nintendo eShop. The PlayStation 4 version released in February 2021.

== Reception ==
Reception

Aggregate score
Aggregator	Score
Metacritic	55/100

Review score
Publication	Score
Nintendo Life	7/10

Due to the nature of its block-building, open world gameplay and graphic style, the game was noted for being a clone of the 2011 game Minecraft.

The game briefly reached number 1 in the European charts, number 2 in the US charts and number 3 in the Japan charts on the Nintendo eShop.

Nintendo Life gave the game a 7/10, praising the game's new ideas but criticizing the long load times.

Eurogamer reviewed the game in 2015, stating: "Unless you're a die-hard Wii U fanatic or have a prehistoric PC that can't run Minecraft, there's really no reason not to just play Minecraft instead of Cube Life. The game isn't necessarily bad—it just doesn't add enough of its own ideas to its inspiration to stand out."
