= Armillo =

2014 video game

- Developer: Fuzzy Wuzzy Games
- Publisher: Fuzzy Wuzzy Games
- Engine: Unity
- Platforms: Wii U, Windows
- Release: Wii U; July 3, 2014; Windows; July 3, 2020
- Genre: Puzzle-platform
- Mode: Single-player

Armillo is a 2014 3D puzzle-platform game developed by Fuzzy Wuzzy Games. It was released on July 3, 2014, for the Wii U on the Nintendo eShop. A Windows port was released on July 3, 2020.

== Gameplay ==
Armillo is an action platform game in which the playable character, an armadillo named Armillo, rolls around a 3D space. He can perform three primary actions: roll, jump, and boost. The game is designed around the concept of an obstacle course, so the player is constantly being presented to various new puzzles, mechanics, and challenges.

Gameplay has been likened to other games such as the Sonic the Hedgehog series, Super Mario Galaxy, and the Super Monkey Ball series. Players primarily progress through levels by rolling Armillo and have the option to utilize the tilt controls of the Wii U's GamePad to do so. Armillo is aided in his quest through special abilities and power-ups such as a size boost and the Critter gun which fires the non-playable Critters at Armillo's enemies.

While the majority of the game takes place in a 3D world, there are unlockable 2D bonus stages in every single non-boss level. Purchasable upgrades, obtained using blue orbs collected in levels, also enable optional backtracking of previously completed levels.

== Development ==
Armillo was developed by Fuzzy Wuzzy Games for the Wii U and is distributed on the Nintendo eShop. The game was originally planned to be a timed exclusive, and was scheduled to be released on other platforms within a few months of release, but this fell through. The decision was made in honor of Nintendo's recent support for independent developers.

The game was released on Steam for free in July 2020 with the option to support the developers for US$3.99.

== Reception ==
Armillo received mixed reviews since its release. It holds an aggregate score of 79% at GameRankings and 72 at Metacritic, the latter of which indicates mixed or average reviews. Critics praised the amount of content available and its stylistic charm, but note that the game does struggle graphically and artistically. Critics also occasionally encountered technical problems, notably frame rate issues.

Reception

Aggregate scores
Aggregator	Score
GameRankings	79%
Metacritic	72/100

Review scores
Publication	Score
Destructoid	7.5/10
Nintendo Life	8/10
Nintendo World Report	8/10
The Independent	3/5
Cubed3	8/10
