= Shadow Puppeteer =

2014 video game

- Developer: Sarepta Studio
- Publisher: Snow Cannon Games
- Engine: Unity
- Platforms: Windows, Wii U
- Release: Windows: WW: September 29, 2014; Wii U: WW: January 28, 2016
- Genres: Adventure, puzzle-platform
- Modes: Single-player, multiplayer

Shadow Puppeteer is an adventure puzzle-platform game developed by the Norwegian independent developer Sarepta Studio for Microsoft Windows and Wii U. The PC version has been released September 29, 2014. The Wii U version was released worldwide on January 28, 2016.

== Gameplay ==
Promo artwork for Shadow Puppeteer

The game can be played both in single-player mode or shared screen local co-op. A boy and his shadow have to cooperate to make their way and find the evil shadow puppeteer. Together they need to solve puzzles based on manipulating three types of lightsources and three shadow tools called "stencils" in-game. The puzzles are a mix of 2D and 3D, as the boy is free to move in any direction, while the shadow is limited to being projected on 2D surfaces and using shadows cast by objects as platforms. Moving an object also moves its shadow. Similarly, moving a shadow can move the object casting it. In order to solve the puzzles, the players can also manipulate the light sources and alter the dimensions of the shadows.

On their way, the boy and the shadow pass through 5 different worlds. Each world introduces new elements the players need to master. An example would be a shadow scissors which allows the shadow to cut shadow strings. Another element would be the shadow bombs, which allow the shadow to destroy both the shadow of a wall and the wall itself. In their path, the two characters also have to fight shadow monsters.

Even though each character can act independently, the two are connected with a string. Increasing the distance too much leads to the string snapping and the player having to start the level over. The two characters share similarities, but each have their own limitations and abilities.

== Plot ==
The story starts in the evening, as an evil man, the shadow puppeteer, arrives in the village. The atmosphere is dark, whimsical and gloomy. The puppeteer plays his music box and harvests the shadows of everyone in the village. Only the main character, a little boy, still has his shadow. He falls through the floor and becomes separated from his shadow as the puppeteer tries to harvest it. The music box breaks so the puppeteer leaves without the boy's shadow. The game consists of the boy's and the shadow's journey to find the shadow puppeteer and free the stolen shadows. On their way, they go through five worlds, fight shadow monsters and cooperate to solve physics puzzles based on manipulation of light and shadow. The story is told without any actual dialogue or text, and relies on visual storytelling through 2d animation, 3d character expression and musical cues.

As the boy and his shadow progress through the story they are confronted by increasingly powerful shadow puppets. However, as the Shadow Puppeteer's power grows a question arises, who is the greater threat, the puppeteer or the shadows?

== Development ==
The game was initially conceived as a student project at the Hedmark University College in Norway before a number of graduates formed the game development company Sarepta Studio AS. The company used a mixture of public funding, including the Nordic Game Program and the Norwegian Film Institute., in addition to profits that company generated from contractual 3D visualisation work. Consequently the game took several years to produce and refine.

After an initial PC release on steam, the game went through a period of further funding and refinement, which sort to address a number of flaws and unpolished features due in part to the game's protracted development cycle. The game was re-released for the Nintendo Wii U console in late 2015.

== Reception ==
The game received mixed to positive reviews, receiving a Metascore of 57%. While the game had been praised for its original gameplay, whimsical cartoony art and gloomy atmosphere, there was also negative feedback. The complaints focused on the game being too difficult to control the 2d and 3d characters at the same time in single-player mode.

A major update had been released September 14, 2015, addressing some of the issues mentioned by reviewers and also by simplifying some areas of the game. Nevertheless Destructoid only awarded the game a score of 5 out of 10, saying "Shadow Puppeteer tries to do interesting things but ultimately comes off as unpolished, bland, repetitive, and mediocre." In early 2016 an improved version of the game was released on the Nintendo Wii U console, which included a significant revamp of the 3D graphics, user interface and gameplay. The product was rebranded as a "couples co-op" or as a "cooperative game for families", which led to more favourable user reviews. However, the game's metacritic score did not approve significantly as critics continued to voice the issue of the game's complexity in single-player mode.
