= The Letter (video game) =

2014 video game

- Developer: TreeFall Studios
- Publisher: TreeFall Studios
- Platforms: Wii U, PlayStation 4, Windows
- Release: Wii U: NA/PAL: July 10, 2014; PS4, Windows: NA/PAL: November 8, 2022
- Genre: Adventure
- Mode: Single-player

The Letter is an adventure mystery game developed and published by Eli Brewer of American indie studio TreeFall Studios. The player takes the role of a young boy, Michael Kennedy, who receives a mysterious letter from his missing father and begins a quest to find him. The game was developed on an underfunded budget across one to two months and subsequently released on the Nintendo eShop on July 10, 2014. Critical reception was strongly negative upon its release, with some reviewers stating that it was not a legitimate game and others suggesting its removal from the eShop. The game was later re-released as The Letter: Classic Edition on PlayStation 4 and Windows via Steam on November 8, 2022.

== Gameplay ==
The Letter is a narrative-based game where the player controls a young boy named Michael Kennedy. He finds a letter from his father Taylor, which states that he has been hired for an "off the books" construction job in a valley down the road from their mountain home, and that he could be dead by the time Michael reads it. Michael decides to go searching for his father. The game features four different areas that are explored in sequence, consisting of Michael's house, a construction site, and the exterior and interior of a medical testing facility. Each level requires Michael to find a specific object in order to progress. Additional letters from Taylor are hidden in each area to offer clues about what happened to him.

The game ends with Michael awakening on vacation, realizing the whole experience was a dream and his father is alive. If the player finds four hidden VHS tapes in the preceding levels, an additional scene plays in which Michael falls back asleep, re-entering his nightmare and finding a fifth tape, though it is too damaged to be watched and he wakes up again. The game can be completed in less than one hour.

== Development and release ==
Eli Brewer was inspired to make The Letter after listening to soundtracks of horror games including Eternal Darkness: Sanity's Requiem, ZombiU, Call of Duty: Zombies, and Resident Evil. With the lack of mystery horror games for the Wii U at the time, Brewer wanted "to shake up the landscape of the game selection with [The Letter]". Fundraising on Indiegogo lasted from March 5 to March 24, 2014, and resulted in only $377 being pledged, 8% of the $5,000 goal. Brewer developed the game part-time in one to two months, and said that even with a $5,000 budget, the game still would not have been as good as he thought it could have been.

On June 24, TreeFall announced that Nintendo approved The Letter for release on the Nintendo eShop. It is the studio's first game to be released, and although the game was initially planned for May, it became available on July 10. On August 13, a trailer for version 1.1 was released, adding new items, creatures, and environments.

On October 31, 2022, TreeFall announced a port of The Letter would be coming to PlayStation 4 and Windows via Steam under the title The Letter: Classic Edition. The port was released a week later on November 8, and features updated retro visuals and bug fixes, though the story remains unchanged.

== Critical reception ==
Reception

Aggregate scores
Aggregator	Score
GameRankings	12.52%
Metacritic	14/100

Review scores
Publication	Score
Hardcore Gamer	1/5
Nintendo Life	1/10
Nintendo World Report	2/10
Cubed3	0/10
Pure Nintendo Magazine	4.5/10

The Letter received negative reviews from critics. As of October 2022, the game holds an aggregate score of 12.52% on GameRankings and 14 out of 100 on Metacritic. Criticisms covered the total lack or poor quality of every aspect of the product: gameplay, presentation, production values, plot, and length. Some reviewers asked why Nintendo approved it on the eShop at all, and others stated that they did not think it was really a game.

A zero-out-of-ten-star review came from Albert Lichi of Cubed3, who called The Letter Brewer's "attempt to exploit ignorant consumers". Nintendo Life's Dave Letcavage, awarding the game one out of ten stars, named it a "half-formed thought scribbled, almost illegibly, across a post-it note". In a review for Hardcore Gamer, Nikola Suprak gave The Letter a one out of five, concluding that the game "needs to die an unloved death on the Nintendo eShop purchased by absolutely no one". Daan Koopman, writing for Nintendo World Report, said that it "shows that honest intentions will not always get you a good game", and he scored it a two out of ten. Jonathan Holmes of Destructoid called it "an unbelievable new Wii U eShop game", comparing it to other cheaply made games that were released on the WiiWare, including Muscle March, Eco Shooter: Plant 530, and Monsteca Corral. WiiU Daily's Ashley King, opining that it should not be on the eShop, used it as an example of the major issues with Nintendo's quality control, saying it was "an embarrassment for the developer, but most of all...an embarrassment for Nintendo". In a less harsh review, Trevor Gould, reviewing for Pure Nintendo Magazine, said that, even though the game ended way too abruptly and felt unfinished, it is "not bad while it lasts".

Brewer responded to the negative reception of the game:

Just don't give up on the game yet if you're a hater out there, I guess. I'm working on it best I can, I had no money, and I'm just getting started at this game development thing. Hopefully I'll be able to improve it, but we'll definitely learn from our past mistakes like what we've made with this one, but there's a lot of people out there who have enjoyed it, so thank you a whole lot for your support.
