= Off-TV Play =

Feature of the Wii U GamePad

Off-TV Play is a feature of Nintendo's eighth-generation video game console, the Wii U. Like all video game consoles, the Wii U uses a console and a controller to manipulate an image on a television screen. The Wii U's unique feature is that its controller, the Wii U GamePad, has its own built-in screen for displaying images. It can display an entirely different image, or duplicate the television screen into the Wii U GamePad. It also allowed for 2-player multiplayer, where each person would have their own screen with no need for Co-op splitscreen. Off-TV Play is the term used for when an entire game is played strictly on the controller, without the use of a television. The GamePad also features two speakers and an audio jack that can be used for Off-TV Play. It is an optional feature, with only select games supporting it. There is no standardized way to activate Off-TV Play and how it is implemented depends on the game.

== Background ==
The Wii U console was officially unveiled at E3 2011 in June 2011, where it was first detailed that the console's controller would feature a tablet-like touchscreen. Nintendo announced that a major focus of the console would be the ability to display the image seen on the television on the touchscreen, to continue playing the game if the television was needed for other uses, or the player needed to move away from the television. Official terms were given at E3 2012; the controller was named the Wii U GamePad and the concept of playing games strictly on its screen being labeled Off-TV Play.

For supported games, a television isn't required to be connected to the Wii U; the Wii U can operate in Off-TV Play mode as long as the console is connected to a power source. However, as the processing is done on the console, and transmitted to the GamePad, the user must still keep within the transmitting range for it to work. Not all games support Off-TV Play, as some games conceptually rely on the asymmetric interplay between the television screen and the Wii U GamePad screen, such as Nintendo Land and ZombiU. However, all Wii U Virtual Console titles purchased from the Nintendo eShop include the option to use Off-TV Play. Original Wii games and Wii Virtual Console games were not initially compatible either, although this was changed in the Wii U's September 30, 2013 system update, which allows it, but only through the use of original Wii peripherals as input methods, meaning that the image would appear on Wii U GamePad screen, but its buttons would not work, requiring the use of Wii Remotes and Wii accessories for button and joystick input. This was partially revised again in January 2015; when Nintendo began releasing Wii games digitally on the Wii U eShop. Because games re-released in this fashion were reworked to run straight from the Wii U operating screen, and not Wii Mode, the game allowed for Off-TV Play on Wii games with GamePad controls, provided the game allowed for Classic Controller usage in its Wii release.

== List of Off-TV Play compatible software ==
=== Games ===
Title	Genre	Developer	Publisher	Availability	Ref.
The Amazing Spider-Man: Ultimate Edition	Action-adventure	Beenox	Activision	^{NA, EU}	
The Amazing Spider-Man 2	Action-adventure	Beenox	Activision	^{NA, EU}	
Angry Birds Trilogy	Puzzle	Rovio Entertainment	Activision	^{NA, EU}	
Armillo	Action-adventure	Fuzzy Wuzzy Games	Fuzzy Wuzzy Games	^{NA}	
Assassin's Creed III	Action-adventure	Ubisoft Quebec	Ubisoft	^{AUS, EU, NA, JP}	
Assassin's Creed IV: Black Flag	Action-adventure	Ubisoft Quebec	Ubisoft	^{AUS, EU, NA, JP}	
Batman: Arkham City Armored Edition	Action-adventure	WB Games Montréal	Warner Bros. Interactive	^{AUS, EU, NA, JP}	
Batman: Arkham Origins	Action-adventure	WB Games Montréal	Warner Bros. Interactive	^{AUS, EU, NA, JP}	
Batman: Arkham Origins Blackgate – Deluxe Edition	Action-adventure	Armature Studio	Warner Bros. Interactive Entertainment	^{EU, NA}	
Bayonetta	Action, hack and slash	PlatinumGames	Nintendo	^{AUS, EU, NA, JP}	
Bayonetta 2	Action, hack and slash	PlatinumGames	Nintendo	^{AUS, EU, NA, JP}	
Ben 10: Omniverse	Action-adventure	D3 Publisher	D3 Publisher	^{AUS, EU, NA}	^{[a]}
Bit.Trip Presents... Runner2: Future Legend of Rhythm Alien	Platformer	Gaijin Games	Gaijin Games	^{AUS, EU, NA}	
Bombing Bastards	Action	Sanuk Games	Sanuk Games	^{NA}	
Call of Duty: Black Ops II	First-person shooter	Treyarch	Activision	^{AUS, EU, NA, JP}	
Call of Duty: Ghosts	First-person shooter	Infinity Ward	Activision	^{AUS, EU, NA, JP}	
Captain Toad: Treasure Tracker	Puzzle	Nintendo EAD Tokyo, 1-Up Studio	Nintendo	^{AUS, EU, NA, JP}	
Cars 3: Driven to Win	Racing	Avalanche Software	Warner Bros. Interactive Entertainment	^{AUS, EU, NA}	
Castlestorm	Puzzle, strategy	Zen Studios	Zen Studios	^{AUS, EU, NA}	
Chasing Aurora	Other	Broken Rules	Broken Rules	^{AUS, EU, NA}	
Child of Light	Platformer, role-playing	Ubisoft Montreal	Ubisoft	^{AUS, EU, NA, JP}	
Cloudberry Kingdom	Platformer	Pwnee Studios	Ubisoft	^{AUS, EU, NA}	
Darksiders II	Action-adventure	Vigil Games	THQ	^{AUS, NA, EU}	
Deus Ex: Human Revolution Director's Cut	Action role-playing, First-person shooter, stealth	Straight Right	Square Enix	^{AUS, EU, NA}	
Disney Infinity	Platformer, sandbox	Avalanche Software	Disney Interactive Studios	^{AUS, EU, NA}	
Disney's Planes	Amateur flight simulation	Behaviour Interactive	Disney Interactive Studios	^{AUS, EU, NA}	
Don't Starve: Giant Edition	Action-adventure	Klei Entertainment	Klei Entertainment	^{EU, NA}	
Donkey Kong Country: Tropical Freeze	Platformer	Retro Studios	Nintendo	^{AUS, EU, NA, JP}	
Dr. Luigi	Puzzle	Nintendo SPD, Arika	Nintendo	^{NA, EU, JP}	
Dragon Quest X	MMORPG	Square Enix, Armor Project	Square Enix	^{JP}	
DuckTales: Remastered	Platformer	Capcom, WayForward Technologies	Capcom, Disney Interactive Studios	^{AUS, EU, NA}	
Dungeons & Dragons: Chronicles of Mystara	Beat 'em up, action role-playing	Iron Galaxy Studios	Capcom	^{NA, EU}	
Edge	Puzzle, action	Two Tribes	Two Tribes	^{AUS, EU, NA}	
FIFA Soccer 13	Sports	EA Canada	EA Sports	^{AUS, EU, NA, JP}	
Gaiabreaker	Shoot 'em up	Ubiquitous Entertainment	Ubiquitous Entertainment	^{JP}	
Giana Sisters: Twisted Dreams	Platformer	Black Forest Games	Black Forest Games	^{AUS, EU}	
Guacamelee!: Super Turbo Championship Edition	Platformer, beat 'em up	DrinkBox Studios	DrinkBox Studios	^{EU, NA}	
Hyrule Warriors	Action, hack and slash	Omega Force, Team Ninja	Nintendo, Tecmo Koei	^{AUS, EU, NA, JP}	
Just Dance 4	Rhythm	Ubisoft Paris, Ubisoft Reflections, Ubisoft Bucharest, Ubisoft Pune, Ubisoft Milan	Ubisoft	^{AUS, EU, NA}	
Kirby and the Rainbow Curse	Platformer	HAL Laboratory, Nintendo SPD	Nintendo	^{AUS, EU, NA, JP}	
The Legend of Zelda: Breath of the Wild	Action-adventure	Nintendo EPD	Nintendo	^{AUS, EU, NA, JP}	
The Legend of Zelda: The Wind Waker HD	Action-adventure	Nintendo EAD Group No. 3	Nintendo	^{AUS, EU, NA, JP}	
The Legend of Zelda: Twilight Princess HD	Action-adventure	Nintendo EPD	Nintendo	^{AUS, EU, NA, JP}	
Lego Batman 2: DC Super Heroes	Action-adventure	Traveller's Tales	Warner Bros. Interactive	^{AUS, EU, NA}	
Lego Marvel Super Heroes	Action-adventure	Traveller's Tales	Warner Bros. Interactive	^{AUS, EU, NA}	
The Lego Movie Videogame	Action-adventure	TT Games, TT Fusion	Warner Bros. Interactive	^{AUS, EU, NA}	
Little Inferno	Puzzle	Tomorrow Corporation	Tomorrow Corporation	^{AUS, EU, NA}	
Madden NFL 13	Sports	EA Tiburon	EA Sports	^{NA}	^{[b]}
Mario Kart 8	Racing	Nintendo EAD Group No. 1	Nintendo	^{AUS, EU, NA, JP}	
Mass Effect 3: Special Edition	Action role-playing	Straight Right	Electronic Arts	^{AUS, EU, NA, JP}	
Mighty Switch Force!: Hyper Drive Edition	Platformer	WayForward Technologies	WayForward Technologies	^{AUS, EU, NA}	
Mighty Switch Force! 2	Platformer	WayForward Technologies	WayForward Technologies	^{AUS, EU, NA}	
Minecraft: Wii U Edition	Sandbox	4J Studios, Mojang	Microsoft	^{JP, EU, NA}	
Monster Hunter 3 Ultimate	Action role-playing	Capcom Production Studio 1, Eighting	Capcom	^{AUS, EU, NA, JP}	^{[c]}
Mutant Mudds Deluxe	Run and gun, platformer	Renegade Kid	Renegade Kid	^{NA}	
Nano Assault Neo	Shooter	Shin'en Multimedia	Shin'en Multimedia	^{AUS, EU, NA, JP}	
NBA 2K13	Sports	2K Sports	2K Sports	^{AUS, EU, NA}	
Need for Speed: Most Wanted U	Racing	Criterion Games	Electronic Arts	^{AUS, EU, NA, JP}	
NES Remix	Action, arcade	indieszero	Nintendo	^{AUS, EU, NA, JP}	
NES Remix 2	Action, arcade	indieszero	Nintendo	^{AUS, EU, NA, JP}	
New Super Mario Bros. U	Platformer	Nintendo EAD Group No. 4	Nintendo	^{AUS, EU, NA, JP}	^{[d]}
New Super Luigi U	Platformer	Nintendo EAD Group No. 4	Nintendo	^{AUS, EU, NA, JP}	
Ninja Gaiden 3: Razor's Edge	Action-adventure, hack and slash	Team Ninja	Nintendo	^{AUS, EU, NA, JP}	
One Piece: Unlimited World Red	Action-adventure	Ganbarion	Bandai Namco Games	^{AUS, EU, NA, JP}	
Pac-Man and the Ghostly Adventures	Platformer	Monkey Bar Games	Bandai Namco Games	^{AUS, EU, NA}	
Pikmin 3	Real-time strategy	Nintendo EAD Group No. 4	Nintendo	^{AUS, EU, NA, JP}	
Ping 1.5+	Puzzle	Nami Tentou Mushi	Nami Tentou Mushi	^{EU, NA}	
Pokkén Tournament	Fighting	Bandai Namco	The Pokémon Company	^{NA, JP}	
Pokémon Rumble U	Action role-playing	Ambrella	Nintendo	^{AUS, EU, NA, JP}	
Puddle	Puzzle	Neko Entertainment	Neko Entertainment	^{AUS, EU, NA}	
Pushmo World	Puzzle	Intelligent Systems	Nintendo	^{AUS, EU, NA, JP}	
Rayman Legends	Platformer	Ubisoft Montpellier	Ubisoft	^{AUS, EU, NA, JP}	
Resident Evil: Revelations	Survival horror	Capcom, Tose	Capcom	^{AUS, EU, NA, JP}	
Rush	Puzzle	Two Tribes	Two Tribes	^{AUS, EU, NA}	
Scribblenauts Unlimited	Puzzle	5th Cell	Nintendo	EU	
Scribblenauts Unmasked: A DC Comics Adventure	Puzzle	5th Cell	Warner Bros. Interactive	^{AUS, EU, NA}	
SDK Paint	Art application	HullBreach Studios	HullBreach Studios	^{NA}	
Shovel Knight	Platformer	Yacht Club Games	Yacht Club Games	^{EU, NA}	
Skylanders: Giants	Platformer	Vicarious Visions	Activision	^{AUS, EU, NA}	
Skylanders: Spyro's Adventure	Platformer	Toys for Bob	Activision	^{JP}	
Sniper Elite V2	Tactical shooter	Rebellion Developments	505 Games	^{AUS, EU, NA, JP}	
Sonic & All-Stars Racing Transformed	Racing	Sumo Digital	Sega	^{AUS, EU, NA, JP}	^{[e]}
Sonic Boom: Rise of Lyric	Action-adventure	Big Red Button Entertainment	Sega	^{AUS, EU, NA}	
Sonic Lost World	Platformer	Sonic Team	Sega, Nintendo	^{AUS, EU, NA, JP}	
Super Mario 3D World	Platformer	Nintendo EAD Tokyo	Nintendo	^{AUS, EU, NA, JP}	
Super Smash Bros. for Wii U	Fighting	Sora Ltd. and Bandai Namco Games	Nintendo	^{AUS, EU, NA, JP}	
Tekken Tag Tournament 2: Wii U Edition	Fighting	Namco Bandai	Namco Bandai	^{AUS, EU, NA, JP}	
Toki Tori	Puzzle	Two Tribes	Two Tribes	^{AUS, EU, NA}	
Toki Tori 2+	Puzzle	Two Tribes	Two Tribes	^{AUS, EU, NA}	
Tom Clancy's Splinter Cell: Blacklist	Stealth, action-adventure	Ubisoft Shanghai	Ubisoft	^{AUS, EU, NA, JP}	
Trine 2: Director's Cut	Puzzle	Frozenbyte	Frozenbyte	^{AUS, EU, NA}	
Unepic	Platformer, role-playing	Francisco Téllez de Meneses	EnjoyUp Games	^{EU, NA}	
Watch Dogs	Action-adventure	Ubisoft Bucharest	Ubisoft	^{AUS, EU, NA, JP}	
Wii Fit U	Fitness	Nintendo EAD Group No. 5, Ganbarion	Nintendo	^{AUS, EU, NA, JP}	^{[f]}
The Wonderful 101	Action	PlatinumGames	Nintendo	^{AUS, EU, NA, JP}	
Xenoblade Chronicles X	Role-playing video game	Monolith Soft	Nintendo	^{NA, EU, JP}	
Yakuza 1 & 2 HD Collection	Action-adventure	Sega	Sega	^{JP}	
Zen Pinball 2	Pinball	Zen Studios	Zen Studios	^{AUS, EU, NA}	

^[a]Off-TV Play must be initially activated via a menu on the TV screen.

^[b]Off-TV Play cannot be activated or disabled mid-game.

^[c]An update is required to use Off-TV Play.

^[d]When using the feature in multiplayer mode, only platforms can be placed using the Wii U GamePad's touchscreen and a Wii Remote and/or Wii U Pro Controller is required.

^[e]Off-TV Play is activated by swiping down on touchscreen.

^[f]Some activities require both the GamePad and TV screen and are not compatible with Off-TV Play.

=== Applications ===
Title	Developer	Publisher	Availability	Ref.
Amazon Video	Amazon	Amazon	^{EU, NA, JP}	
Internet Browser	Nintendo Network Business & Development	Nintendo	^{AUS, EU, NA, JP}	
Netflix	Netflix, Inc.	Netflix, Inc.	^{EU, NA, JP}	
Wii Karaoke U	Joysound, Nintendo	Nintendo	^{EU, JP}	
Wii Street U	Nintendo Software Technology	Nintendo	^{AUS, EU, NA, JP}	
Wii U Panorama View	Nintendo	Nintendo	^{AUS, EU, NA, JP}	

== Reception ==
The concept received mostly positive reviews, but was criticized due to the lack of a standardized way to activate it and it being an optional, instead of required, feature.

CNET praised the feature as being "nothing short of fantastic [...] because it prevents the monopolization of a TV while gaming – something anyone who doesn't live alone can appreciate. For those households where the main TV is in constant demand, off-TV sounds like a godsend." However, a major concern cited is that it wasn't a required feature, meaning the developers can opt out of making it possible in their respective games, so in theory, it could become obsolete. Kotaku praised it as well, stating that it is a good feature for those who like to multi-task, since it frees up the television for other uses. TechSpot described it as "a luxury few people asked for but that turns out to be wonderful to have". Destructoid praised it for being exactly the same as playing on the television, only "with some limited portability for no extra charge. Hard to find fault in that." GamesRadar praised the feature for being perfect for the avid television watcher, but criticized the fact that there wasn't a standardized way to activate it, such as its own button. IGN stated in their review for the Wii U, that in regards to single player experiences, they preferred it when the entire game could be transferred to the GamePad over using it in conjunction with a television.

Some critics argued that the image has superior quality while using Off-TV Play, while others cited concerns over the small size of the screen making it difficult to see all the details of the image. Eurogamer's "Digital Foundry" testing showed that the Wii U's Off-TV Play feature outperformed Sony's similar Remote Play feature on its PlayStation 4 and PlayStation Vita systems in image quality, latency, and frame-rate. Pocket Gamer agreed, stating that Off-TV Play-offered far less lag than Remote Play.

While critics generally praised the Wii U update enabling Off-TV Play support to original Wii software played in Wii Mode, they generally lamented the update's shortcoming of requiring Wii controllers and peripherals to play rather than the Wii U GamePad itself. This was partially rectified by Nintendo in January 2015, when they announced that Wii games digitally re-released for the Wii U eShop would allow for GamePad controls, because they play directly through the Wii U, and not "Wii Mode" when using the disc version of the games.

== See also ==
- Wii U GamePad
- Remote Play
- Xbox SmartGlass
- Steam Link
- List of Wii U software
