= Rive (video game) =

2016 video game

- Developer: Two Tribes
- Publisher: Two Tribes Publishing B.V.
- Engine: Open-source internal engine
- Platforms: PlayStation 4, Microsoft Windows, Nintendo Switch, OS X, Linux
- Release: Microsoft Windows, Linux, Mac OS X, PlayStation 4; September 13, 2016; Nintendo Switch; November 17, 2017
- Genres: Platform, shoot 'em up
- Mode: Single-player

Rive is a platforming shoot-em-up game created by the Dutch video game company Two Tribes for PlayStation 4, Microsoft Windows, OS X, Linux and Nintendo Switch, and is the first major release by the company after the company's downsizing and closure of their primary development team in late 2013. The game was unveiled in July 2014, after a long time of quiet development of the game that originated as a 3D shooter for the Nintendo DS in 2005. The game uses the same engine as Toki Tori 2+ and was developed by a three-man core team.

== Gameplay ==
Rive is a classic 2D side-scrolling platformer mixed with shooting elements, with the ability to shoot in full 360 degrees around the player character who gains the ability to "alter the behavior of their robotic enemies by collecting and uploading hacks." The game features a mission system and high scores for players to come back to after completing the game's story.

== Development ==
Rive was originally confirmed to be in development for the Wii U since September 2014, and a demo version was even included in the Wii U eShop's promotional "Nindies@Home" campaign in June 2015. Although the title was originally intended to release in September 2016 on the Wii U alongside other platforms, Two Tribes co-founder Collin van Ginkel was skeptical regarding the game's release for the console due to technical difficulties maintaining the title's optimal performance. Van Ginkel said if the Wii U build fails to reach expectations, they would move the title to the upcoming Nintendo Switch, then known as "NX".

Rive was later confirmed for Nintendo Switch, dropping the Wii U version. The Switch version was developed in collaboration with Engine Software. It includes an exclusive Copilot Mode, which allows two players to control the same ship co-operatively using each Joy-Con, as well as improved performance over the PlayStation 4 version running 60 frames per second at 1080p. The Nintendo Switch version was released on November 17, 2017, worldwide, with 48 additional achievements and HD Rumble support, under the title Rive: Ultimate Edition.

== Release ==
In September 2016, Two Tribes teamed up with IndieBox, a monthly subscription box service, to offer a custom-designed, physical version of Rive. This limited collector's edition included a DRM-free game disc, the official soundtrack on CD, an instruction manual and Steam key, as well as various collectible items. A physical version of Rive was also released for Nintendo Switch in August 2019 titled Rive: Ultimate Edition sold by Super Rare Games. This limited run release includes full interior artwork, game cart, manual and trading cards.

== Reception ==
Rive

Aggregate scores
Aggregator	Score
GameRankings	(PC) 72% (PS4) 71% (Switch) 85%
Metacritic	(PC) 73/100 (PS4) 75/100 (Switch) 82/100

Review scores
Publication	Score
GameSpot	8/10
IGN	6.5/10
Nintendo Life	9/10
Nintendo World Report	8/10

Rive received generally favourable reviews, particularly for its Switch port which earned an 82/100 on Metacritic and an 85% on GameRankings.

GameSpot rated the game 8/10, praising its game design, challenging encounters, environments, and graphics. They additionally highlighted how the Switch version added more score-based game modes and co-op gameplay.

IGN was less favourable towards the game, giving it a 6.5/10. They critiqued the game's margin for error and level design which lead to overly repetitive sections. They enjoyed many of the game's more puzzle-like sections but felt it included too few of them. IGN further critiqued the game's dialogue, limited enemy diversity, poor repeatability, and failing to provide a feeling of progression.
