= Garfield: A Tail of Two Kitties (Nintendo DS video game) =

2006 video game

- North America cover art
- Developer: Two Tribes
- Publisher: The Game Factory
- Platform: Nintendo DS
- Release: NA: October 5, 2006; EU: October 29, 2006
- Genre: Platform
- Mode: Single-player

Garfield: A Tail of Two Kitties, released in Europe as Garfield 2, is a 2006 platform video game developed by Two Tribes and published by The Game Factory for the Nintendo DS. The game received mixed reviews from critics.

== Gameplay ==
An example of gameplay in Garfield: A Tail of Two Kitties

Garfield: A Tail of Two Kitties is a 2.5D side scroller platform game. The player controls Garfield, who must travel through England to get to the castle in time for a lasagna dinner after being invited by Prince XII. The game consists of 22 levels, and there is a time attack mode for some levels. The player may collect various food items. At the start of each level the player receives 9 hit points, which are depleted by the contact with environmental hazards. The game over triggers once they lose all hit points.

== Development and release ==
Garfield: A Tail of Two Kitties was announced in January 2006. It was developed by Two Tribes, and published by The Game Factory. It was released in North America on October 5, 2006. and in Europe on October 29.

== Reception ==
Reception

Aggregate score
Aggregator	Score
Metacritic	59/100

Review scores
Publication	Score
GameZone	5.7/10
IGN	4.5/10
Jeuxvideo.com	9/20
HonestGamers	3.5/5

Garfield: A Tail of Two Kitties received "mixed or average" reviews according to review aggregator Metacritic. Lucas Thomas, writing for IGN, called it a "by-the-numbers platformer with little tie-in to its source material". While he found "a few impressive visual moments" in the game, he concluded the experience was overall uninspiring. GameZone likewise called the gameplay "as much repetitive as it is boring", dismissing the experience as uninteresting and unoriginal.
