= Two Tribes (company) =

Independent video game developer

Two Tribes B.V.
- Company type: Private
- Industry: Video games
- Founded: 2001
- Founders: Martijn Reuvers; Collin van Ginkel
- Headquarters: Harderwijk, Netherlands
- Key people: Martijn Reuvers; Collin van Ginkel
- Products: Toki Tori series
- Parent: Two Tribes Publishing B.V.
- Website: twotribes.com

Two Tribes B.V. is an independent video game developer based in Harderwijk, Netherlands. Founded in 2001 by Martijn Reuvers and Collin van Ginkel, it develops its own intellectual property and games for franchises. The office closed in September 2016, after the release of Rive, but Two Tribes continues development of the Nintendo Switch version of Rive, as well as supporting older games.

== History ==
Two Tribes originally specialized in portable games and later developed games for consoles due to the popularity of the Wii and Xbox 360. Two Tribes has focused on developing games for Windows and Macintosh, including online distribution. The company started by porting its franchises, Toki Tori and RUSH, to Windows and Mac OS through Steam and the Mac App Store. The company has started to work with other developers to port their games to other platforms, such as Swords & Soldiers, by Ronimo Games to iOS and Edge by Mobigame to Windows and Macintosh. Two Tribes has worked with major video game companies including Capcom, Nokia, Team17, and THQ.

In January 2014, Two Tribes B.V. filed for bankruptcy, mainly due to disappointing sales of Toki Tori 2, but Two Tribes Publishing B.V., which owns and publishes all Two Tribes B.V. games and handles all contracts, remained unaffected. A new daughter company was formed to handle the development of future titles. One working title was RE:Wind, later announced as Rive.

In 2024 Two Tribes teamed up with Modretro to release an ultimate edition of Toki Tori for their Chromatic handheld console. It includes some quality of life improvements over the original as well as being compatible with the original Game Boy handheld among others.

== Games ==
- Toki Tori
  - 2001, Game Boy Color; published by Capcom
  - 2003, mobile phone; published by Aim Productions
  - 2008, WiiWare
  - 2009, iOS
  - 2010, Windows/Macintosh/Linux
  - 2011, PlayStation 3/Android
  - 2013, Wii U
  - 2015, Nintendo 3DS (next to the earlier Game Boy Color version on Virtual Console, a new 3D remake was released in November 2015, both published by Two Tribes)
  - 2018, Switch
  - 2024, (Ultimate Edition, released for Modretro Chromatic handheld console)
- Three Tribes (cancelled, Game Boy Advance)
- Bonk's Return (2006, mobile phone; published by Hudson Entertainment)
- Monkeyball Minigolf (2006, mobile phone; published by Sega Mobile)
- Garfield: A Tail of Two Kitties (2006, Nintendo DS; published by The Game Factory)
- Golf Pro Contest 2 (2007, mobile phone; published by Blaze)
- SpongeBob SquarePants: Creature from the Krusty Krab (2007, mobile phone; published by THQ Wireless)
- Worms: Open Warfare 2 (2007, Nintendo DS; published by THQ)
- Rubik's Puzzle World (2008, Wii/Nintendo DS; published by The Game Factory)
- Rubik's Puzzle Galaxy: RUSH (2009, WiiWare)
- Frenzic (2010, DSiWare)
- Ice Age: Dawn of the Dinosaurs (2010, iOS)
- RUSH (2010, Windows; 2011, Macintosh/Linux; 2013, Wii U)
- Swap This! (2011, iOS; 2018 Switch)
- Swords & Soldiers (2011, iOS; 2014, Wii U)
- Edge (2011, Windows/Macintosh/Linux/Android; 2013, Wii U/Nintendo 3DS)
- Toki Tori 2 (2013, Windows/Macintosh/Linux/Wii U; 2016, PlayStation 4; 2018, Switch)
- Rive (2016, Windows/Macintosh/Linux/PlayStation 4; 2017, Switch)
