= Toki Tori =

2001 puzzle-platform game

- Developer: Two Tribes
- Publishers: Two Tribes; Capcom (GBC); Chillingo (mobile); ModRetro (Chromatic)
- Designers: Collin van Ginkel; Michiel Frishert; Martijn Reuvers; Laurens van Klaveren; Chris J. Hampton
- Composer: Chris J. Hampton
- Series: Toki Tori
- Platforms: Game Boy Color, Android, Linux, iOS, OS X, Microsoft Windows, Windows Mobile, PlayStation 3, Wii U, Nintendo 3DS, Nintendo Switch, ModRetro Chromatic
- Release: 26 September 2001: Game Boy Color; NA: 26 September 2001; PAL: 1 March 2002 WiiWare; PAL: 20 May 2008; NA: 2 June 2008 iOS; NA: 22 May 2009 Windows; NA: 28 January 2010; EU: 29 January 2010 Wii U; NA: 7 November 2013; PAL: 7 November 2013 PlayStation Network; PAL: 18 November 2011; NA: 17 December 2013 Nintendo 3DS; WW: 5 November 2015; JP: 23 March 2016 Nintendo Switch; WW: 30 March 2018 Chromatic; WW: 25 December 2024
- Genres: Platform, puzzle
- Mode: Single-player

Toki Tori is a puzzle-platform video game developed by Two Tribes and published by Capcom for the Game Boy Color. The game follows a young chick, Toki Tori, and his quest to rescue his younger siblings, still in their eggs. To progress through the game, the player must pick up each egg on a level using a set number of tools, with new tools being introduced as the player progresses through the four worlds. This usually involves careful planning and creative thinking.

Toki Tori was later released for Windows Mobile and an enhanced remake was released for Nintendo's Wii via WiiWare after Two Tribes acquired the rights to the game. In the Summer of 2009, Chillingo published another enhanced remake of the game for the iOS. In 2010, Two Tribes released a Windows remake on Steam. A DRM-free version of the game was released in January 2012 as part of the Humble Bundle for Android. This marked a simultaneous release of the game on OS X, Linux and Android. The original version of the game was re-released on the Nintendo 3DS's eShop as a Virtual Console title on 31 August 2012, and an HD remake of the game was released for the Wii U eShop on 7 November 2013. An updated version of Toki Tori was released on the Nintendo 3DS eShop on 5 November 2015. A release for the Nintendo Switch eShop followed on 30 March 2018.

A sequel, Toki Tori 2, was released in 2013.

== Story ==
The story begins in a chicken coop with many unhatched eggs. All of a sudden the eggs are swept away except one that coincidentally falls out of the coop and hatches. Out of the egg comes the chicken, Toki Tori. He watches as his brothers and sisters fly towards a scary looking castle. He decides to set out on an adventure and rescue his unborn family.

In the beginning cinematic, Toki Tori is on a cliff overlooking a castle and surrounded by a forest. He begins his quest in this forest, which ends with him entering the castle. In this castle, Toki Tori learns that he has special abilities that help him locate the eggs such as telewarp and bridge builder from a book he finds. He also learns in the castle that his powers were most likely the reason of the eggs' kidnapping. Upon finishing the castle world, Toki Tori falls through a trap door where he lands in the sewers, infested with slugs. When he is done collecting his brethren from this world, a strong torrent of water sweeps him up and sends him to Bubble Barrage, the last area of the game. After traversing this underwater world, Toki Tori returns home with his brothers and sisters.

== Gameplay ==
The first world, Forest Falls, of Toki Tori

Gameplay in Toki Tori consists of using a limited number of tools to gather up all the eggs in the level in a single run through it in a certain amount of time. Toki Tori is given a set number of tools in the beginning of a level. The puzzles are designed around the tools so they must be used intelligently and usually using a tool incorrectly makes the level unbeatable. Enemies usually appear following a simple patrol of walking back and forth, turning when they hit an obstacle. If they touch Toki Tori, he instantly dies, forcing the player to restart the level. Some tools are weapons that can defeat these monsters, but they must be used wisely to allow completion of the level. Besides the threat of monsters, a timer is constantly ticking down. If the timer reaches zero, the player must restart the level. Once the player has a clear idea of how to beat the level, however, there is usually ample time to execute the plan. There are fifteen levels in each of the four worlds, not including tutorial levels that appear when a previously unseen tool appears. Only the first ten are required to enter the next area. The other five are much more difficult and are there to add replay value.

=== Worlds ===
There are four worlds in Toki Tori: Forest Falls, Creepy Castle, Slime Sewers (Slime Caves in the Game Boy Color version) and Bubble Barrage. The worlds become progressively more challenging as the player progresses through them, with later levels usually only having one specific way of collecting all the eggs. The most obvious difference in the worlds and their unique enemies is simply cosmetics. Enemies all behave in the same fashion and the goal of each world is the same: collect all the eggs in one attempt.

The biggest difference in the worlds, besides cosmetics, is how each world has a specific tool associated with it. Forest Falls is the only level above water with the Freeze-o-matic, which used incorrectly can create obstacles as it freezes enemies in place. Creepy Castle contains the Ghost Trap, usable for passing through stone walls as well as beating ghosts. Slime Sewers contains the Snail Sucker, which is the only weapon that directly removes an enemy from the map. Bubble Barrage contains the Freeze-o-matic as well. When underwater, the frozen enemies float up so the game considers it a separate tool. Also Bubble Barrage uniquely contains the Bubble Suit.

At the end of the ten normal worlds, the player is treated to a short cinematic of Toki Tori entering the next world either on purpose or by accident. This is used to connect the levels more directly for the sake of the story.

=== Tools ===
Tools are Toki Tori's main method of accomplishing his goal. The game claims ten different tools, as they count Freeze-o-matic a second time when used underwater. At the start of each level, the player is given a certain number of up to four separate tools (not including the Eyes tool). Although not officially separated, tools come in two varieties: navigation and weapons.

Navigational tools help Toki Tori move around obstacles and get to higher and lower floors that would be otherwise inaccessible. For example, Toki Tori can jump half his height up and half his height forward. To cross a pit, then, he would need to fill the pit with blocks using his Crate Creator or place a platform over it with the bridge builder. Some items allow him to through walls, such as the telewarp. The most versatile tool is the Bubble Barrage-only Bubble Suit. It allows Toki Tori to travel one half his width/height in any of the four directions, to cross pits, climb up floors or avoid enemies. If the player has at least one use of it left, they may float indefinitely. It also can be refilled to five, ten or fifteen uses at recharge points scattered throughout most Bubble Barrage levels.

Weapon tools allow Toki Tori to hinder enemies or even remove them from the level. These are especially useful as Toki Tori has no life bar so a single hit will end the current attempt. The Freeze-o-matic freezes an opponent in a block of ice which will either fall to the ground or float up to the ceiling depending on whether the level is underwater or not. In both cases, careful planning can ensure that the block of ice is a platform while poor planning can make it a road block. The Ghost Trap, when placed on stone floors, causes the floor to give way when a ghost walks on it. This doesn't destroy the ghost but can get it out of the player's way. It also allows the Ghost Trap to work as a navigational tool to get to lower floors. The Snail Sucker sucks can either suck in slugs, removing them from the level, or cause them to change directions if they aren't sucked all the way into the Snail Sucker. The latter use does not cost one use of the Snail Sucker.

One tool that is different from the rest is the Eyes tool. This tool is available on every level and has unlimited uses. It pauses Toki Tori and any enemies in the level, but not the timer, and allows the player to freely look at the level, controlling the camera with the directional pad, which assists in planning their path.

The Eyes tool and timer were only present in the GBC version of Toki Tori.

== Development ==
=== Eggbert ===
Eggbert was released in 1994 for the MSX 2 by Fony, a game developer. This game later served as the basis for Toki Tori when some staff from Fony went on to found Two Tribes.

As a predecessor, many elements from Eggbert reappear in Toki Tori. The goal of an older brother rescuing his egg-bound siblings is maintained. The fundamental gameplay style was also carried over from predecessor to successor. Eggbert is given a limited amount of up to three tools which must be used conservatively and intelligently to gather eggs while avoiding enemies which lurk about the stages. The character appearance of Toki Tori is the same as Eggbert, though with graphical improvements to the sprite. Eggbert provided three of the four worlds for Toki Tori. Many tools from Eggbert reappear in Toki Tori, though some are cosmetically different: for example, Toki Tori's Freeze-o-matic works identically as Eggbert's slime gun; Eggbert's clone creator, which makes a gray, life-sized doll of Eggbert that acts both as a blockade and a platform, is functionally identical to Toki Tori's Crate Creator.

The Chip Level of Eggbert, which was replaced by Creepy Castle in Toki Tori

The changes between the two are minor, showing no drastically redesigned composition. The name change from Eggbert to Toki Tori was because a game similar in name, called Speedy Eggbert had emerged and partly due to phonological aesthetic, as the Japanese language interpretation 'time bird' (時鳥; トッキー・トリー) has no pertinence to the Two Tribes design. The major difference between story plots is a strong wind sweeping away Toki Tori's siblings, whereas they ran away from Eggbert. There is no exposition of Eggbert's abilities as there is of Toki Tori at the end of the "Creepy Castle" level, which replaced the predecessor's "Chip Level". In technical gameplay, Eggbert had shorter and simpler levels than its successor, which also added a complement of 20 "extra-hard" levels. The tutorial levels of Eggbert were all placed in the same optional world, as opposed to Toki Tori's mandatory tutorial levels scattered throughout the game. A few of Eggbert's tools were omitted, including one that turned him invisible or one magnet that caused an enemy to reverse direction, though the ability of this latter tool was added to the "Snail Sucker" in Toki Tori. An example of a tool unique to the successor is an Eye which allows Toki Tori to peer around the entire level, an ability unnecessary in Eggbert.

=== Remakes and re-releases ===
AIM Productions published a port of the game for Windows Mobile with improved graphics and slight changes to certain levels in 2003. In 2009, Chillingo published the game for iOS (iPhone).

=== Wii version ===
An enhanced remake of Toki Tori was released for the Wii via WiiWare in 2008. It was a WiiWare launch title in Europe, being released on 20 May, and later in North America on 2 June.

The Wii remake of Toki Tori features a 3D design while retaining his two dimensional scrolling gameplay, and allows players to use a control scheme that uses the Wii Remote's pointer function to lead Toki Tori through each level. Traditional control is also available. A second player can also draw hints on screen with the Wii Remote.

The remake features redesigned versions of the original levels, in addition to new levels, on a new game code base.

=== iPhone version ===
An iPhone version was released in May 2009, published by Chillingo. It includes a new touch control system, and a few extra bonus levels not included in the Wii version.

=== PC version ===
A PC version was released on Steam in January 2010. It includes the same extra bonus levels as the iPhone version. Possible control devices for the character on screen include keyboard, mouse and gamepad. Two Tribes has promised to release periodic bonus levels as a free update through Steam, and also stated that a level editor for the PC version was considered as well. As of February 2010, a number of bonus levels were released exclusive to the PC version. Also, a new rewind/fast forward feature was released exclusive for the PC version that allows the player to undo a mistake without having to redo the level all over again.

=== PlayStation Network version ===
A PlayStation Network version was released for PlayStation 3 on 18 November 2011 in Europe which supports the PlayStation Move feature and 3D-compatible. A North American version was released on 17 December 2013.

=== Wii U version ===
After releasing the updated Toki Tori 2+, developer Two Tribes planned to release a line of three of their classic titles for the Wii U console via Nintendo eShop. One of the first of these classic titles was the HD version of the first Toki Tori game. Based on the enhanced PC version rather than the WiiWare release, the Wii U version features touchscreen controls using the GamePad, Off-TV Play, and the Portal 2 ARG content. Although it was scheduled for release on 31 October 2013 for both North American and PAL versions of the console, the game was delayed until 7 November, which was shown on the Nintendo US official game page.

=== Nintendo 3DS version ===
Despite the classic Game Boy Color version being re-released for the Nintendo 3DS Virtual Console in 2012, Two Tribes developed a new version of Toki Tori specifically for the Nintendo 3DS, alongside fellow indie developer Engine Software, whose staff is composed of people that originally worked on Eggbert, the game that inspired Toki Tori. This version supports stereoscopic 3D visuals and was released on 4 November 2015.

=== Nintendo Switch version ===
A Nintendo Switch version of Toki Tori was released on 30 March 2018. Two Tribes cited this version as "the most detailed portable version of the game so far". It was released at a budget price whilst featuring all the content from the HD remaster, in addition to HD Rumble and video capture support.

=== Chromatic version ===
A Chromatic version titled Toki Tori - Ultimate Edition by ModRetro was released on 25 December 2024. It's largely the same as the Game Boy Color original with quality of life features such as faster movement, an auto-jump and the removal of the timer. Other changes include a new splash screen, minor text edits, the removal of the option to swap A and B's actions and the addition of viewing the credits via the options menu.

== Reception ==
Reception

Aggregate scores
Aggregator	Score
GameRankings	GBC: 80% iOS: 94%
Metacritic	WII: 79/100; PC: 80/100; PS3: 75/100; 3DS: 76/100; NS: 82/100

Review scores
Publication	Score
Game Informer	7.5/10
GamePro	4/5
GameSpot	8.2/10
IGN	9/10
Nintendo Life	8/10; 9/10
Cubed3	8/10

Award
Publication	Award
IGN	Editors' Choice Award

Toki Tori was one of the last games released for the Game Boy Color. Some critics have attributed the interest surrounding the newly released Game Boy Advance, coupled with the fact that Toki Tori was a new name in the industry as the reason it was ignored by the public at large.

Reviews were generally positive from the critics, being viewed as an intelligent addition to the dying Game Boy Color system. A GamePro writer commented how its challenging puzzles made it an enjoyable game. One Game Informer reviewer called it "thoughtful title in Game Boy Color's sea of pooped-out platformers". Besides the puzzles, critics also praised the graphics saying the game "even fits right at home on the Game Boy Advance, looking as close to a native GBA game as any Game Boy Color title has ever come".

Reviews for the WiiWare release of the game were also positive, with IGN giving the game an 8/10, saying that the gameplay holds up extremely well, with the presentation significantly better than the original Game Boy Color release. N-Europe highly praised the title, giving it a 9/10 and commenting that it was 'oozing with charm and held together with love'. The WiiWare version was nominated for multiple Wii-specific awards by IGN in its 2008 video game awards, including Best WiiWare Game and Best Puzzle Game.

== Sequel ==
A sequel, Toki Tori 2, was released in 2013.
