= Rubik's Puzzle World =

2008 video game

- PAL Wii cover art
- Developer: Two Tribes
- Publisher: The Game Factory
- Platforms: Nintendo DS, Wii
- Release: Nintendo DS: NA: October 28, 2008; EU: November 14, 2008; Wii: NA: November 4, 2008; EU: November 21, 2008
- Genre: Puzzle
- Modes: Single-player, multiplayer

Rubik's Puzzle World, known as Rubik's World in North America, is a puzzle video game for the Wii and Nintendo DS platforms developed by Two Tribes and published by The Game Factory. The video game features the famous Rubik's Cube, originally designed by the Hungarian inventor Ernő Rubik. The game contains the likeness of the cube as well as a playable version of the Rubik's Cube, as well as multiple puzzle game modes involving the Cube's constituent parts, known as "Cubies".

== Gameplay ==
Rubik's Puzzle World features multiple game modes, which capitalize on the Wii and Nintendo DS' pointer-based motion controls and differ across the two platforms:

- Rubik's Cube: Players can learn how to solve any of three Rubik's Cubes of differing size, then use interactive controls to manipulate a virtual replica of one, racing against time to either solve it or reproduce as many configurations of the cube as possible with increasing complexity.
- Guide/Roll/Color: The player must place signs on a board that can help safely guide single file lines of Cubies to like-colored receptacles, similar to ChuChu Rocket. The Nintendo DS version replaces this mode, known as "Guide", with two different variants: a "Roll" mode where players must manually and individually guide cubes to receptacles on a board and a "Color" mode in which the player must strategically color the sides of Cubies before rolling them to goal receptacles.
- Fit: The player must position Cubies behind holes of a series of advancing walls, taking care to not let any wall hit a Cubie, similar to the game show Human Tetris. The Wii version factors in gravity and the ability to alter the shape and size of Cubies, while the DS version has the player manipulating a group of Cubies, moving them around to help the group fit into the holes in the wall while maintaining an unbroken shape.
- Switch: The player must strategically swap one particular Cubie with another such that at least five Cubies of like colors are connected to each other so that they can be freed, similar to Puzzle League. The Wii version has a multi-level puzzle campaign for this mode, while the DS version implements this as a procedurally generated endless survival arcade game.
- View: (Wii exclusive) The player is challenged to use a limited supply of certain Cubies to build a structure that simultaneously matches certain images from certain points of view.
- Deconstruct: (Wii exclusive) The player aims and fires white Cubies at a structure to knock down cool-colored Cubies and score enough points to clear each level, while avoiding warm-colored ones, utilizing physics similar to Boom Blox.
- Calculate: (DS exclusive) The player races to solve pairs of two simple math problems to place Cubies on a 10x10 grid to build a bigger image as fast as possible. Each mode that features a multi-level campaign contains 40 levels to play across two difficulty tiers (except the Wii version's Fit mode, which has only 30 levels), with several tutorial levels. As players clear more puzzle levels in each mode's campaign, the titular Rubik's World seen in the main menu screen will start to gain more and more color. Both version also have two creative game modes, Create and Compose, in which the player uses Cubies to freely design their own 3-D structures or tunes respectively, which go on to influence the game's interface in particular ways. Some modes in the Wii version support the Nunchuk and utilize its analog stick for camera control. Some modes can also be played against up to three other players.

== Reception ==
Reception

Aggregate score
Aggregator	Score
Metacritic	64/100

Review scores
Publication	Score
GamesRadar+	3.5/5
IGN	6.5/10
PALGN	7.9/10 (Wii); 7.5/10 (DS)

Rubik's Puzzle World received "mixed or average" reviews, according to review aggregator Metacritic, which assigned the game a weighted average score of 64 out of 100, based on nine critics.

== Follow-up games ==
Some of the game modes in Rubik's World have been used later in another Two Tribes release, Rubik's Puzzle Galaxy: Rush (Wiiware). In 2010, Two Tribes released a PC follow-up simply titled Rush on Steam.
