= Pet Alien: An Intergalactic Puzzlepalooza =

2007 video game

- North American cover art
- Developer: Shin'en Multimedia
- Publisher: The Game Factory
- Series: Pet Alien
- Platform: Nintendo DS
- Release: AU: June 14, 2007; NA: July 30, 2007; EU: September 14, 2007
- Genre: Puzzle
- Mode: Single-player

Pet Alien: An Intergalactic Puzzlepalooza (French: Alien Bazar : Mission Crétinus), also known as simply Pet Alien, is a puzzle game developed by Shin'en Multimedia and published by The Game Factory for the Nintendo DS. It is based on the television series Pet Alien.

== Gameplay ==
In An Intergalactic Puzzlepalooza, players control the five aliens: Dinko, Gumpers, Flip, Swanky and Scruffy. They all have their special abilities, and the purpose of the game is to utilize these abilities in order to obtain certain gems that lie scattered around various levels. The player starts out controlling Gumpers, and as the player progresses throughout the game, the other aliens become unlocked.

The game centers on five aliens and their quest to save their Earthling friend Tommy Cadle. The aliens and Tommy Cadle are taken into space in the evil Robotix (who want them and Tommy for their zoo)'s spaceship, where the aliens have to overcome numerous obstacles in order to escape and save their friend using their unique abilities.

== Reception ==
Reception

Aggregate score
Aggregator	Score
Metacritic	58/100

Review scores
Publication	Score
Eurogamer	4/10
GamePro	1.75/5
GameZone	5.9/10
IGN	5/10
Jeuxvideo.com	11/20
NGamer	70%
Nintendo Power	8/10
Official Nintendo Magazine	69%
PALGN	5/10
Pocket Gamer	3.5/5

The game received "mixed" reviews according to the review aggregation website Metacritic. GameZone gave the Australian version a mixed review, a month-and-a-half before its U.S. release date.
