= Legend of the Dragon (video game) =

2007 video game

- PlayStation 2 cover of Legend of the Dragon
- Developer: Neko Entertainment
- Publisher: The Game Factory
- Composer: Raphaël Gesqua
- Engine: Proprietary
- Platforms: Wii; PlayStation 2 PlayStation Portable
- Release: Wii, PlayStation 2: NA: May 1, 2007; PlayStation Portable: NA: May 29, 2007; AU: June 14, 2007; EU: June 15, 2007
- Genre: Fighting
- Modes: Single-player, Multiplayer

Legend of the Dragon (French: La Legende du Dragon) is a fighting game for the Wii, PlayStation 2 and PlayStation Portable. It was developed by French company Neko Entertainment and published by The Game Factory on May 1, 2007. The story follows the animated series of the same name.

== Gameplay ==
The game's roster features 24 characters from the series. Players are able to move around freely in the outside universe or places of combat. Locations featured in the series are present in the game as combat arenas: the 12 Sacred Temples, the Dragon Dojo, the Zodiac Master's hideout, the Temple of Shadow Dragon, the Great Wall of China, and Hong Kong Bay. Eight game modes are present for players to choose from: Play Quest, Arcade, Training, Survival, Time Attack, Versus, Team Battle, and Tag.

=== Playable Characters ===
- Ang (Golden Dragon)
- Bastet (Bastet Lioness)
- Beingal (Tiger Guardian)
- Billy (Ram Guardian)
- Chang Wo (Shadow Ape Dragon)
- Chow (Dog Guardian)
- Cobra (Snake Guardian)
- Jaguar God (Were-Jaguar)
- K Ho (Shadow Wolf Guardian)
- Ling (Shadow Dragon)
- Lo Wang (Rooster Guardian)
- Ming (Rat Guardian)
- Robbie (Ox Guardian)
- Shoong (Pig Guardian)
- Victor (Shadow Ox Guardian)
- Woo Yin (Zodiac Master)
- Xuan Chi (Monkey Guardian)
- Yin Wi (Shadow Rat Guardian)

== Reception ==
Reception

Aggregate scores
Aggregator	Score		
Aggregator	PS2	PSP	Wii
GameRankings	28.50%	42.07%	39.50%
Metacritic	29/100	38/100	37/100

Review scores
Publication	Score		
Publication	PS2	PSP	Wii
G4			2/5
GameSpot	3.0/10	3.2/10	3.0/10
GamesRadar+		1.5/5	
GameZone		3.7/10	3.2/10
IGN	3.0/10	2.5/10	3.8/10

Legend of the Dragon received negative reviews from critics. On Metacritic, the game holds scores of 29/100 for the PlayStation 2 version based on 4 reviews, and 37/100 for the Wii version based on 14 reviews, and 36/100 for the PSP version based on 12 reviews. On GameRankings, the game holds scores of 28.50% for the PlayStation 2 version based on 4 reviews, 42.07% for the PSP version based on 14 reviews, and 39.50% for the Wii version based on 14 reviews. Various publications criticized the game for poor graphics and animations, lack of variety in fighting moves for the characters, and poor controls for the Wii version.
