= Toki Tori 2 =

2013 video game

- Developer: Two Tribes B.V.
- Publishers: Two Tribes B.V. Rainy Frog^{JP}
- Series: Toki Tori
- Platforms: Wii U, PlayStation 4, Nintendo Switch, Microsoft Windows, OS X, Linux
- Release: Wii U: WW: April 4, 2013; JP: September 3, 2014; Microsoft Windows, OS X: WW: July 11, 2013; Linux: WW: January 3, 2014; PlayStation 4: WW: February 23, 2016; Nintendo Switch: WW: February 23, 2018
- Genres: Platform, puzzle, Metroidvania
- Mode: Single-player

Toki Tori 2 is a puzzle platform game, developed by Dutch video game development company Two Tribes. It is the sequel to the 2001 game Toki Tori. The game was originally announced in December 2011 with an intended release for Spring 2012 for Steam and iOS devices (and later as a Wii U game), but the game was pushed back due to longer than expected development times. The game was released on April 4, 2013 for Wii U and on July 11 on Steam for Windows and for Mac OS X.

An updated version called Toki Tori 2+ was released for the Wii U in September 2013, adding new music and puzzles. Toki Tori 2+ made its Linux debut with Humble Bundle X launched on January 3, 2014. The game was later released in Japan and published by Rainy Frog on September 3, 2014. Toki Tori 2+ launched for the Nintendo Switch on February 23, 2018.

== Gameplay ==
The gameplay in Toki Tori 2 is very different compared to its predecessor, the main difference being the absence of items for Toki Tori to use. These are replaced by two skills that Toki Tori has during the game that are used to manipulate the environment and the creatures within it, the first one being Whistle which generally causes creatures to move closer to Toki Tori as well as being used to whistle songs that perform various actions. The other ability available to Toki Tori is Stomp. Stomp generally scares creatures into moving away from Toki Tori as well as breaking some parts of the environment. There are also other elements that make up the game, for example if Toki Tori walks into water his feathers will become wet which can then be used for other tasks such as walking through cut grass while wet will cause it to grow so it can be used.

In-game screenshot

The game also features various features that are new to the series, one of these features being the Tokidex. The Tokidex is one of the collectables in the game, as the game is played the player can use a song to bring up the camera which is controlled via the Wii U controller (or through the keyboard on the computer version). This camera is then used to take pictures of the creatures that appear in the world, the player is rewarded for collecting pictures of every creature in the game.

== Development ==
Before the game was announced it was hinted at numerous times by Two Tribes; the main example of this was a QR Code that could be found in the Windows/Mac port of Edge which led to a countdown timer. When this countdown timer ended it changed to show a picture of a buried Toki Tori skeleton with a hole in the ground next to it. After the countdown ended, Toki Tori 2 was announced shortly after.

When the game was revealed, the work started on the game and at this point Two Tribes invited fans to become part of the development process by providing access to an alpha build of the game through Steam. This started off as a concept art viewer but as new features for the game were created they were implemented into the alpha, such as the level editor. Two Tribes also implemented an input recording function in the alpha which allowed them to ask players to complete tasks or levels in the alpha and then send their recording to Two Tribes for it to be used to improve the game as well as fix bugs.

The level editor for the Wii U was cancelled due to lower than anticipated sales and various technical difficulties.

The planned iOS version of the game was cancelled.

Toki Tori 2+ was released on Nintendo Switch eShop in February 2018, officially launching in North America, Europe, and Australia. Described as definite version of the game by Two Tribes, it runs at 1080p in TV Mode and 720p in Handheld Mode and 60 fps and comes with new secrets, HD Rumble, and video capture support.

== Reception ==
Reception

Aggregate score
Aggregator	Score
Metacritic	(Wii U) 76/100 (PC) 76/100 (PS4) 78/100 (NS) 84/100

Review scores
Publication	Score
IGN	8/10
Joystiq	4/5
Nintendo Life	7/10
Nintendo World Report	9/10
Official Nintendo Magazine	87%

Toki Tori 2 received positive reviews. IGN praised the game for its exploration, graphics and subtle controls meanwhile criticising the game for its slow pace and lack of action. Joystiq also praised the game for explorative and non hand holding nature, beautiful artwork and brain-bending puzzles. Nintendo World Report praised the game for its vibrant game play.
