= Strawberry Shortcake: Musical Match-ups =

- Official box art
- Developer: Parker Brothers
- Publisher: Parker Brothers
- Programmer: Dawn Stockbridge
- Series: Strawberry Shortcake
- Platform: Atari 2600
- Release: NA: April 1983
- Genre: Puzzle
- Mode: Single-player

Strawberry Shortcake: Musical Match-ups is a 1983 puzzle video game published by Parker Brothers for the Atari 2600. It was designed for young girls aged four to seven and is based on the Strawberry Shortcake franchise created by American Greetings. It was programmed by Dawn Stockbridge. The evil Purple Pieman has rearranged the body parts of Strawberry Shortcake and her friends. Players are tasked with rearranging the characters to receive musical jingles and brief animations at various levels of difficulty.

Critics had difficulty rating the experience due to its target demographic, but it was praised generally for its colorful, crisp graphics and its abundance of musical tunes. The few critics that gave it to young children however found they lost interest with the game quickly. It also received criticism for its limited dancing animations.

== Gameplay ==
Strawberry Shortcake: Musical Match-ups is a puzzle game aimed at girls aged four to seven. The plot follows Strawberry Shortcake and her friends Huckleberry Pie, Blueberry Muffin, and Lime Chiffon who are putting on a talent show in a gazebo. The evil Purple Pieman has scrambled their bodies and the player is tasked with reassembling them. Each character is split into three parts, head, torso, and legs. Players use the joystick to scroll through each body parts in an attempt to arrange the characters correctly. Pressing the action button submits an answer, playing a musical jingle arranged based on the selected body parts. On correct guesses, the characters name appears and the player get to start again. On the easiest difficulty players can arrange any character they want, but have to assemble an assigned character on harder difficulties. On the hardest difficulties, the player has to arrange the character correctly before the sun in background sets.

== Development & release ==
Strawberry Shortcake: Musical Match-ups was designed by Dawn Stockbridge, an employee of Parker Brothers. It is based on the Strawberry Shortcake franchise, first created in 1972 for American Greetings. The property was later spun off into a series of dolls manufactured by Kenner, then owned by General Mills who also owned Parker Brothers. According to Stockbridge's colleague Laura Nikolich, the game was planned by marketing for brand synergy and was relatively successful. The game was announced at Winter CES 1983 for a March 1983 release. An Intellivision version was also announced to be released in late Summer, but it was never released. The Video Game Update stated that the game was released in North America in April.

== Reception ==
Rick Johnson in Vidiot sarcastically derided the game as "uncontested game of the year" and "the single most important event in human history", though he did call the graphics "really sharp" and thought it was the first time he had "voluntarily enjoyed the tunes". Mike Wilson of the The Logical Gamer had trouble judging the game due to its target demographic but claimed his daughter, who was initially excited, stopped playing the game after a day saying it was "too easy to bother with". Alan R. Bechtold, also from The Logical Gamer, claims his five year old son had a similar experience, though he gave Parker an "A for effort". Brett Weiss in 2007 said it had "some of the cutest graphics ever seen in an Atari 2600 game" but complained about the limited animation "comprised solely of characters moving their legs".

Video Games said "Parker Brothers have genuinely gone out of its way to take into consideration the needs and limitations of the four-to-seven year old age group". They called attention to the fact that players cannot lose, no score is kept, and the game plays a nice jingle instead of a loud buzzer on failure. The Video Game Update said children should have a good time playing because of the colorful graphics and popular characters and thought there was bonus educational value as well. Video Games Player commented that "never before have so many different tunes been heard in one VCS cartridge". JoyStik magazine's Todd Rogers called the music and graphics "captivating". The Book of Atari Software thought it would be appealing to young children because of the "color, cheerfulness, nonviolence, and catchy musical tunes".

== See also ==
- List of Strawberry Shortcake video games
- Cabbage Patch Kids: Adventures in the Park
