= List of Strawberry Shortcake video games =

Provided is a list of all Strawberry Shortcake games (excluding video titles playable only on gaming devices) released to date.

The first game produced was Strawberry Shortcake: Musical Match-Ups in 1983, which featured simplistic gameplay, graphics and sound that were crude by today's standards. No further games based on the franchise were produced until 20 years later, in 2003, when Strawberry Shortcake: Amazing Cookie Party was released for PC.

No.	Game	Publisher	Release year	Platform	Genre	Notes
1	Strawberry Shortcake: Musical Match-ups	Parker Brothers	1983	Atari 2600	Educational/Puzzle/Music	
2	Strawberry Shortcake: Amazing Cookie Party	The Learning Company	2003	Microsoft Windows/Classic Mac OS	Educational/Puzzle	Does not work on Intel-based Macs unless the Windows version is run using Boot Camp or Parallels Desktop.
3	Strawberry Shortcake: Berry Best Friends	The Game Factory	2004	Microsoft Windows/Classic Mac OS/Mac OS X (up to Snow Leopard only)	Educational/Puzzle	Requires Rosetta as codebase is PowerPC, as such the Mac version of the game will not run on Mac OS X Lion, unless the Windows version is run using Boot Camp or Parallels Desktop.
4	Strawberry Shortcake: Summertime Adventure	Majesco	2004	Game Boy Advance	Action/Platformer/Plant growing simulation	A limited version packaged with the GBA video version of Meet Strawberry Shortcake on the same cartridge also exists. Released only in North America.
5	Strawberry Shortcake: Ice Cream Island Riding Camp	The Game Factory	2005	Game Boy Advance	Action/Puzzle	Only released in Europe in limited quantities.
6	Strawberry Shortcake: Sweet Dreams	Majesco	2006	Game Boy Advance	Action/Platformer	Only released in North America.
7	Strawberry Shortcake: Strawberryland Games	The Game Factory	2006	Nintendo DS	Sports/Platformer/Party/Puzzle	
8	Strawberry Shortcake: The Sweet Dreams Game	The Game Factory	2006	PlayStation 2/Microsoft Windows	Action/Platformer	The game was originally planned to be released under the name of Strawberry Shortcake: Adventure in the Land of Dreams before going with the final name, despite not sharing the same story as The Sweet Dreams Movie. A PC port was released exclusively in Europe in 2007.
9	Dance Dance Revolution: Strawberry Shortcake	Konami/Majesco	2006	Plug-and-Play	Dance/Music	Dance mat plugs straight into (NTSC-compatible) TV via RCA connectors. Single player. Comes with scented stickers. Features music from Strawberry Jams and Seaberry Beach Party Music CD.
10	Strawberry Shortcake: The Four Seasons Cake	The Game Factory	2007	Nintendo DS	Action/Platformer	The game was originally scheduled to be released in November 2007, but was only formally announced to be on sale in December edition of the Strawberry Shortcake e-mail newsletter. It is notoriously difficult to find the title in stores and online. The game was given a wide release in Europe, though.
11	Strawberry Shortcake	Those Characters From Cleveland/Soma Creates Inc	2010	iOS	Puzzle	A simple match-the-items game for iOS devices created to celebrate Strawberry Shortcake's 30th anniversary. It is not available in iTunes App Stores outside of the US or Canada.
12	Strawberry Shortcake Bake Shop	Budge Studios	2013	iOS/Android	Simulation/Baking	Players help Strawberry Shortcake and her friends bake a variety of desserts by mixing ingredients, decorating with icing and sprinkles, and completing special orders to earn stars and rewards. The game has in-app purchases.
