= Garfield: A Tail of Two Kitties (video game) =

2006 video game

- European PlayStation 2 cover art
- Developer: Asobo Studio
- Publisher: The Game Factory
- Platforms: Microsoft Windows, PlayStation 2
- Release: PlayStation 2 & Windows: EU: October 6, 2006; NA: October 17, 2006
- Genres: Action, platform
- Mode: Single-player

Garfield: A Tail of Two Kitties, known in PAL regions as Garfield 2, is a video game for PlayStation 2 and Microsoft Windows, released on October 17, 2006. It is based on the film Garfield: A Tail of Two Kitties.

== Gameplay ==
Garfield is a playable character in all versions; the PlayStation 2 and Windows versions, which feature 3D platforming, allow players to switch to playing as Christophe and Claudius. The gameplay loosely follows the plot of the film. The game starts with a quick tutorial.

== Story ==
The story is very similar to the plot of Garfield: A Tail of Two Kitties, with few differences. The game starts in the garden. Garfield must defeat Dargis by completing missions in four areas of the castle.

== Release ==
Garfield: A Tail of Two Kitties was released on PC in North America on October 18, 2006.

== Reception ==
Reception

Aggregate score
Aggregator	Score
GameRankings	PC: 71.50%

Review scores
Publication	Score
GameZone	PC: 7/10
Jeuxvideo.com	PC: 8/20; PS2: 8/20
PC Gamer (US)	PC: 77%
PCMag	PC: 3.5/5

Garfield: A Tail of Two Kitties received moderate reviews. GameRankings gave it a score of 71.50% for the PC version. The PC/PS2 version was viewed more favourably, with PC Gamer calling it "a surprisingly good movie-to-game" and complemented its "outstanding graphics". GameZone referred to the PC version as cute and commented that the game was engaging, but was critical of the controls and inconsistent difficulty.
