= Wii Karaoke U =

2012 video game

- European logo
- Developer: Xing
- Publisher: Nintendo
- Series: Wii
- Platform: Wii U
- Release: JP: December 8, 2012; EU: October 4, 2013
- Genre: Rhythm
- Modes: Single-player, multiplayer

Wii Karaoke U by Joysound (also known as Karaoke Joysound for Wii U) is a karaoke video game developed by Xing and published by Nintendo for the Wii U. The game is a successor to the Wii game Karaoke Joysound, licensing the same Joysound online song library. The game was free to download but required the purchase of a karaoke ticket to sing songs, as well as an internet connection.

The service ended on March 31, 2017, for Europe and June 30, 2023 for Japan.

== Gameplay ==
Several Miis performing a song

The game provides access to an extensive library of songs, launching with over 90,000 songs in Japan and just 1,500 songs in Europe, with more added over time with updates. Users can browse the library by genre, artist, popularity, among other filters. The Wii U GamePad is used to browse and select songs, as well as create a playlist and adjust settings.

Players can either use a USB microphone or the microphone on the Wii U GamePad to sing along to the music. The game was released alongside the Wii U microphone, an official USB microphone accessory from Nintendo. Lyrics are displayed on the TV screen, with visual cues to assist with timing. The GamePad can also be used to show lyrics, allowing a singer to focus on it instead of the TV.

The Wii Karaoke U Menu shown on a Wii U GamePad

After a performance, the singer will be given a score based on pitch, timing, and accuracy. Players can sing solo, as a group, or in a competitive multiplayer mode. The game allows players to connect online, competing for higher online rankings and in the karaoke battle modes.

Songs are performed on stage by Miis, who can be customized to wear different costumes to suit the player's Mii and the performance. Similarly, the stage can be customized to add band members, choreographed dancers, pyrotechnics, among other additions.

Despite being a free download, the game operates on a ticket system that allows users to subscribe to a service for temporary access all the games content, similar to the "day pass" pricing system later used in Wii Sports Club. Users can purchase 1-hour tickets, 2-hour tickets, 24-hour tickets, and a 30-day ticket to access the Joysound song library.

== Controversy ==
Shortly after its launch in Europe, Nintendo Life broke a story revealing that Wii Karaoke U did not censor any of the songs in the Joysound library. This led to concerns as the title granted access to songs with explicit content, making no attempt to warn users that they might sing songs with inappropriate language.

In response, Nintendo issued a statement to Eurogamer announcing the addition of a mature content warning on Wii Karaoke U's eShop page as well as in the app itself.

== Reception ==
Reception

Review scores
Publication	Score
Eurogamer	7/10 (Italy); 6/10 (Portugal)
Official Nintendo Magazine	68%
Megaconsolas	16/24
Multiplayer.it	7.0/10

Official Nintendo Magazine UK gave the game a score of 68%. They claimed Wii Karaoke U ticked all the boxes for a karaoke game but criticized the heavy use of cover songs. Italian Eurogamer gave the game 7/10, citing that the heart of the experience was polished, but notes that the lack of stage customization options and a superficial management of the social components of karaoke hold it back.
