= Brazil cost =

Brazil cost (Portuguese: Custo Brasil [ˈkustu bɾaˈziw]) refers to the increased operational costs associated with doing business in Brazil, making Brazilian goods and services more expensive compared to other countries. For this reason, it is identified as a set of factors that undermine the competitiveness and efficiency of the domestic industry. The “Brazil cost” drains more than 1.5 trillion reais from the economy each year.

There are several factors that contribute to the extra cost, including:

- High levels of public deficits;
- The economy divided into cartels;
- Inefficiency of public services;
- Maintenance of high real interest rates;
- Exaggerated net interest spread of financial institutions (among the highest in the world);
- Excessive bureaucracy for importing and exporting, creating difficulties for foreign trade;
- Low education levels and lack of qualified labour;
- Excessive layers of bureaucracy (red tape), e.g., starting a company in Brazil takes at least 120 days;
- High levels of corruption within the public sector;
- High tax burden;
- Expensive labour costs;
- High social security costs;
- Complex and inefficient fiscal legislation;
- Economic instability;
- High electricity cost;
- Legal uncertainty;
- High interest rates;
- High crime rate, which adds extra security costs;
- Underdeveloped infrastructure, including a deteriorated network for domestic shipping by rail, highway and coastal navigation*.

In 2007, transport costs consumed 13% of GDP, 5% more than in the United States. The high transport costs are exacerbated by the scattering of industry over Brazil's vast territory. In 2013, the poor condition of Brazil’s federal highways increased fuel costs by 1.4 billion reais. The lack of logistics infrastructure for grain transportation alone results in an estimated loss of US$4 billion per harvest.

A study shows that a domestically manufactured good is, on average, 34.2% more expensive than its imported counterpart from Brazil’s main trading partners, solely due to the deficiencies in the country’s business environment.

The World Bank ranked Brazil 123rd in its Doing Business Ranking, which classifies countries by “ease of doing business.” The ranking includes 190 countries (2017).

== See also ==
- Licence Raj
- Fakelaki
