= Edge (video game) =

2008 video game

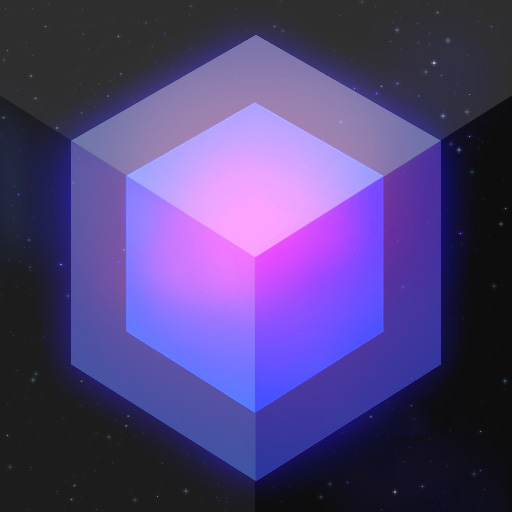
- App icon
- Developer: Mobigame
- Publisher: Mobigame
- Platforms: Linux, iOS, Android, PlayStation Portable, Windows, Mac OS X, Wii U, Nintendo 3DS
- Release: December 2008: iOS; WW: December 2008; Mobile phone; EU: December 17, 2009; PlayStation Portable; EU: December 2, 2010; NA: September 20, 2011; Windows, Mac, Linux; WW: August 11, 2011; Android; WW: February 3, 2012; Wii U; WW: November 21, 2013; Nintendo 3DS; WW: December 26, 2013
- Genre: Puzzle-platform
- Mode: Single-player

Edge is a puzzle-platform game developed by Mobigame for PC and iOS devices. The objective is to guide a rolling cube through maze-like levels and reach the goal. Originally released on the App Store in December 2008, it has been removed and re-added to the store multiple times due to a trademark dispute with Tim Langdell of Edge Games, concerning the use of the word "Edge" in the title. This had caused the game to be briefly released as Edge by Mobigame and Edgy, before ultimately returning to the App Store under its original name in January 2010. The game was released on multiple platforms including mobile phones, PlayStation Portable, Windows, Mac OS X, Linux, Android, Wii U, and Nintendo 3DS. It was released on Steam in August 2011 by publisher Two Tribes.

Edge had a positive reception among reviewers, who praised its minimalistic level design and chiptune soundtrack. The game also received multiple awards including the Milthon Award for Best Mobile Game, two categories in the 5th International Gaming Award, and nominations for three Independent Games Festival categories. An expansion titled Edge Extended was released with new levels, new music, a new 3D engine, and a new computer-controlled dark cube opponent. This expansion was released separately as an independent app for iOS on August 25, 2011, and Android on January 27, 2012. Two Tribes released the expansion as downloadable content (standard levels 10, 12, 14, 19, and the 15 bonus levels) and built-in levels (the remaining 44 standard levels) for the Mac OS X, Linux, and Windows versions of the original game and included in the Wii U and Nintendo 3DS versions of the original game.

== Gameplay ==
Gameplay and edge hangtime, on the iOS release

Edge is a platform puzzle video game with an isometric viewpoint. The player moves a cube by "rolling" its faces toward a given direction. The cube can climb over ledges of equal height. By balancing the cube along the edge of a wall or space, the player can hang across certain edges to cross large gaps. The objective is to navigate the cube through maze-like levels and reach the goal. Levels consist of platforms, moving blocks, switches, and collectible prisms. After completing a level, the player receives a performance ranking based on completion time, number of prisms obtained, and number of times the cube falls off the map. Collecting all prisms in a level and clearing it quickly earns the player a special rank. The player can reduce their level completion time by making the cube hang on the edges and ledges of the maze for extended periods. Smartphone versions offer two control schemes: swiping fingers across the screen (the default) or pressing on-screen buttons. There are 48 main levels and 17 bonus levels. Completing the 48 main levels unlocks Turbo mode, which makes levels move at a faster pace.

Edge Extended adds 48 new levels (plus 15 new bonus levels) and new features. It also introduces an AI-controlled antagonist named "Darkcube" that moves on its own and can disrupt the player by blocking paths and pressing switches.

== Development and release ==
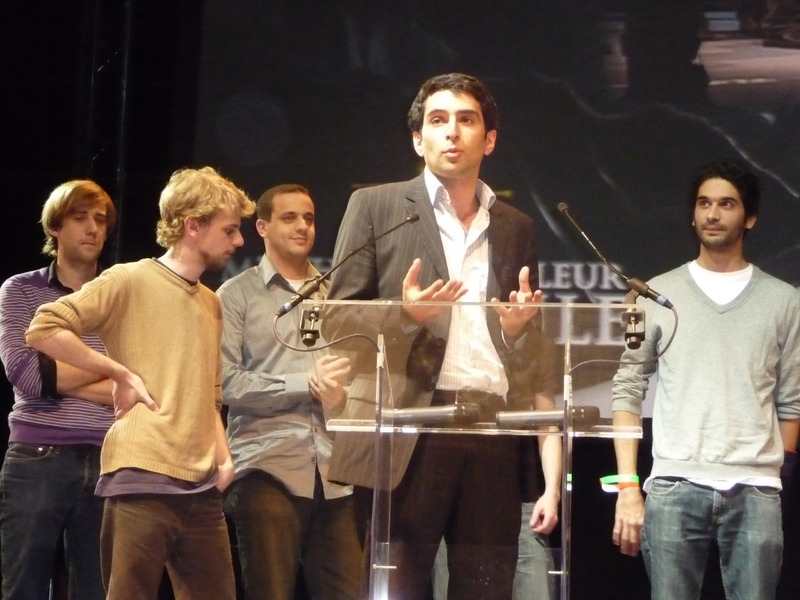
Mobigame at the Paris Game Festival 2008

Edge was developed by a two-man team: David Papazian and Matthieu Malot, collectively known as Mobigame. Malot conceived the core concept of a cube-rolling game in 2004. Development began in 2006. Papazian programmed the game and Malot served as its artist and game designer. Its composers included Romain Gauthier, Simon Périn, Richard Malot, Jérémie Périn, and Matthieu Malot. The team's initial intention was to develop a game dedicated to mobile platforms. After its initial release, Mobigame considered support for keyboard and joypad controllers. They increased the number of levels from 26 to 46, and then to 48 in a few months with free updates. Shortly after the game returned to the Apple App Store, Mobigame upgraded Edge's graphics for compatibility with Retina Display resolution and the iPad's larger screen.

Edge was originally released in December 2008 but was removed from the App Store in May 2009 in a trademark dispute with Tim Langdell of Edge Games. As one of several disputes Langdell had made over his apparent ownership of the trademark for the word 'edge' in video games, Langdell requested a share of the game's revenue but did not reach a resolution with Mobigame. Mobigame's lawyers disputed the enforceability of Langdell's trademark and details of Langdell's claimed communications. The game briefly returned to the App Store five months later under the title Edge by Mobigame despite not having reached an agreement with Langdell, but Apple removed it again after a month. Edge returned to the App Store as Edgy in December, but Mobigame again removed it for fear that Langdell would use the legal precedent in his legal battle against Electronic Arts. By January 2010, Edge was available under its original name in countries other than the United States and the United Kingdom. It returned to the American App Store under its original name several months later.

Connect2Media ported the game onto mobile phone versions in Europe on December 17, 2009. Mobigame also ported to the PlayStation Network as a PlayStation minis in PAL regions on December 2, 2010 and September 20, 2011, in North America. Two Tribes ported the game onto Steam on August 11, 2011, and on the Mac App Store on August 19. Android version was released on February 3, 2012, as part of the first Android Humble Indie Bundle.

Mobigame released an expansion, Edge Extended, as a standalone release for iOS on August 25, 2011, and for Android on January 27, 2012. Unlike the original Edge, whose advanced 2D engine approximated 3D rendering, Edge Extended uses a new 3D graphic engine with optimizations for Retina Display and the iPad 2. Jérémie Torton was hired as a level designer for the game. In 2013, both Edge and Edge Extended were updated with widescreen support. The extended counterpart was initially released with 44 levels, but in a few months they increased the number of levels to 48, and then to 48+15.

Two Tribes developed the Windows, Wii U versions and co-developed the Nintendo 3DS version with Cosmigo. Two Tribes converted the original's tilt and touch controls into keyboard and analog stick controls. In addition, Two Tribes created the 17 bonus levels, new achievements, new leaderboards, and screen resolution modification options. Both the Wii U and 3DS versions contain all levels from the original, Edge Extended, and Windows versions. Two Tribes ported Edge Extended as built-in levels (standard levels 1-9, 11, 13, 15-18, 20-48) and downloadable content expansion (standard levels 10, 12, 14, 19, and the 15 bonus levels) on the existing Windows and Mac OS X releases on August 28, 2011. Two Tribes had since ported both Edge and Edge Extended as a single release onto the Wii U and Nintendo 3DS. The Wii U version was released on November 21, 2013, and December 26 for the Nintendo 3DS version.

The game's original soundtrack was released on March 13, 2009.

== Reception ==
Aggregate review scores
Game	GameRankings	Metacritic
Edge	88% (iOS); 85% (PSP); 73% (PC); 79% (WiiU)	- - 74/100 (PC); 79/100 (WiiU)
Edge Extended	94% (iOS)	91/100 (iOS)

Edge won the Milthon Award for Best Mobile Game at The Paris Game Festival in 2008, and the "Excellence in Gameplay" and "Operator's Choice Award" categories at the 5th International Mobile Gaming Awards. Edge was nominated for "IGF Mobile Best Game", "Audio Achievement" and "Best iPhone Game" at the 2009 Independent Games Festival. The game was included in Edge magazine's top iPhone games as of 2011, and was featured in the 2010 edition of 1001 Video Games You Must Play Before You Die.

The game was well received by critics, albeit to different degrees based on the platform. The PC release received a 74/100 score from Metacritic, based on 12 reviews. The Wii U release of the game received a 79/100 score from Metacritic, out of 9 reviews. Multiple reviewers praised the game's minimalist aesthetics, lively level design, and soundtrack. Kotaku and Slide to Play compared its level designs to that of Marble Madness, and Bonnie Eisenman of 148Apps thought of the levels as "massive playgrounds". Ryan Hewson of Gamezebo praised the game's visual representation for not having "distracting textures" or "throbbing animated backgrounds". GameSpot writer Chris Watters singled out the game's minimalist graphics for creating a unique atmosphere that belied its concept of blocks floating in space. Slide to Play praised its chiptune soundtrack as perfectly fitting the game's minimalist aesthetics. Kotaku's reviewer agreed that the soundtrack matched the game, and called it the best soundtrack of any iPhone game. He further described the music as pensive, soothing, energetic, and mysterious. Pocket Gamer writer Spanner Spencer gave considerable mention to the music stating that "it oozes class and positively pulsates with style".

Regarding Edge's control scheme, Slide to Play noted that some control schemes worked better in certain circumstances than others and criticized the inability to switch control schemes mid-game. Kotaku found some levels impossible to complete with the tilt or touch options, but the D-pad controls were too easy for those who could not handle the former, albeit necessary for the aforementioned impossible levels. Chris Watters made note that the game had a vague clumsiness to it no matter the chosen control scheme due to the cube's rolling momentum. Zachary Miller, in particular, criticized the game's ability to hold onto moving blocks by balancing the cube's edge against it and also found the minimap unhelpful at times.

The Edge Extended expansion's iOS release received "universal acclaim", according to video game aggregator Metacritic. TouchArcade writer Troy Woodfield gave the game a perfect score. Harry Slater of Pocket Gamer gave the expansion the same Gold Award rating as the previous title. Slide to Play described the levels as "cleverly built", but found the dark environments difficult to see in when played in bright sunlight.
