= The Game Factory =

Danish video game publishing company

- Company type: Subsidiary of K.E. Mathiasen A/S
- Industry: Video games
- Founded: 2004
- Defunct: July 2012; 13 years ago
- Headquarters: Aarhus, Denmark
- Parent: K.E. Mathiasen A/S

The Game Factory was a Danish video game publisher operating in Europe and North America. The Game Factory was founded in 2004 and fully owned by K.E. Mathiasen A/S, with headquarters just outside Aarhus, Denmark. Its titles were distributed either by the company's own sales force in Scandinavia, their parent company K.E. Media or from their two fully owned subsidiaries in Santa Monica, California and London, England.

Their final known release was Rubik's World for the Nintendo DS and Wii on November 4, 2008. Both their American and European websites lay dormant until July 2012 when their hosting expired. Their domains eventually followed.

== Games published ==
- Babar
- Babar to the Rescue
- Biker Mice From Mars
- Bratz Ponyz
- Bratz Ponyz 2
- Care Bears: Care Quest
- Cartoon Network Racing
- Code Lyoko
- Code Lyoko: Fall of X.A.N.A.
- Code Lyoko: Quest for Infinity
- Di-Gata Defenders
- Franklin's Great Adventures
- Franklin A Birthday Surprise
- Garfield: A Tail of Two Kitties
- Garfield's Nightmare
- Garfield and His Nine Lives
- Garfield: The Search for Pooky
- Koala Brothers: Outback Adventures
- Miss Spider: Harvest Time Hop and Fly
- Miss Spider: Scavenger Hunt
- The Land Before Time: Into the Mysterious Beyond
- Legend of the Dragon
- Noddy: A Day in Toyland
- Noddy and the Magic Book
- Pet Alien: An Intergalactic Puzzlepalooza
- Postman Pat
- Postman Pat and the Greendale Rocket
- Rubik's Puzzle World
- Strawberry Shortcake And Her Berry Best Friends
- Strawberry Shortcake: The Sweet Dreams Game
- Strawberry Shortcake: Strawberryland Games
- Strawberry Shortcake: The Four Seasons Cake
- Strawberry Shortcake: Summertime Adventure
- Strawberry Shortcake: Ice Cream Island Riding Camp
- Zenses: Ocean
- Zenses: Rain Forest
