= Wii U =

Home video game console by Nintendo

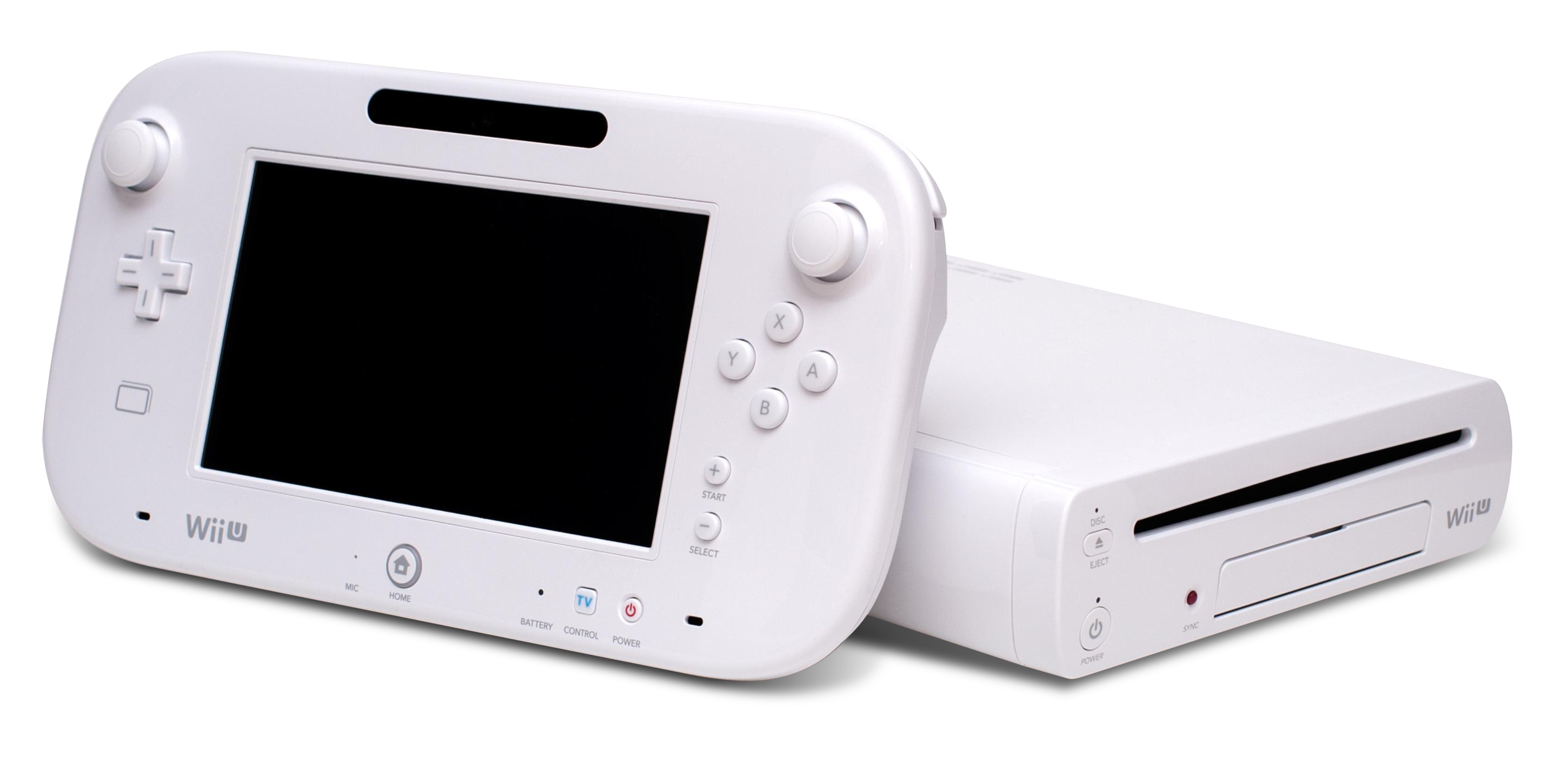
- A Wii U (right) and Wii U GamePad
- Codename: Project Café
- Developer: Nintendo IRD, NTD
- Manufacturer: Nintendo, Foxconn, Mitsumi
- Type: Home video game console
- Generation: Eighth
- Released: NA: November 18, 2012; PAL: November 30, 2012; JP: December 8, 2012
- Introductory price: US$299/¥26,250 (Basic Set) (Deluxe/Premium Set (later bundles)); US$349/¥31,500 (Deluxe/Premium Set)
- Discontinued: January 31, 2017
- Units sold: 13.56 million (as of December 31, 2019) (details)
- Media: Physical and digital: Wii U Optical Disc (25 GB); Wii Optical Disc (4.7 GB/8.54 GB); Digital distribution (Nintendo eShop)
- Operating system: Wii U system software
- CPU: 1.24 GHz tri-core IBM PowerPC "Espresso"
- Memory: 2 GB DDR3
- Storage: Internal flash memory: 8 GB (Basic Set) / 32 GB (Deluxe Set)
- Removable storage: SD/SDHC card (up to 32 GB); USB storage device (up to 2 TB)
- Display: Video output formats: Composite video; S-Video (480i); RGB SCART (480i, 576i) Component video; YP_{B}P_{R}; D-Terminal (480i, 480p, 720p, 1080i, 1080p) HDMI (480p, 720p, 1080i, 1080p); Wii U GamePad (FWVGA)
- Graphics: 550 MHz AMD Radeon-based "Latte"
- Sound: 5.1 linear PCM, analog stereo
- Controller input: Wii U GamePad, Wii U Pro Controller, Nintendo 3DS (select games and applications only) Wii Remote (Plus): Nunchuk attachment; Classic Controller attachment Wii Balance Board
- Camera: 1.3 megapixels (Wii U GamePad)
- Touchpad: Resistive touchscreen (Wii U GamePad)
- Connectivity: Wi-Fi IEEE 802.11 b/g/n Bluetooth 4.0; 4 × USB 2.0
- Power: 75 W
- Current firmware: 5.5.6, as of August 29, 2022; 4 years ago
- Online services: Nintendo Network: Nintendo eShop (discontinued); Miiverse (discontinued); Nintendo TVii (discontinued); Wii U Chat (discontinued)
- Dimensions: Width: 17.2 cm (6.8 in); Height: 4.6 cm (1.8 in); Length: 26.9 cm (10.6 in)
- Weight: 1.5 kg (3.3 lb)
- Best-selling game: Mario Kart 8, 8.46 million (as of March 31, 2026) (list)
- Backward compatibility: Wii
- Predecessor: Wii
- Successor: Nintendo Switch

The Wii U (/ˌwiː ˈjuː/ WEE YOO) is a home video game console developed by Nintendo as the successor to the Wii. Released in late 2012, it was the first eighth-generation video game console and competed with Microsoft's Xbox One and Sony's PlayStation 4.

The Wii U was the first Nintendo console to support high-definition (HD) graphics. The primary controller, the Wii U GamePad, features an embedded touchscreen, a D-pad, analog sticks, and action buttons. The screen can be used either as a supplement to the main display or in supported games to play directly on the GamePad. The Wii U is backward compatible with Wii software and accessories. Games can support any combination of the GamePad, Wii U Pro Controller, Wii Remote, Nunchuk, Balance Board, or Classic Controller. Online functionality included the Nintendo Network and Miiverse, an integrated social networking service which allowed users to share content in game-specific communities.

The Wii U received praise for its GamePad, backward compatibility, lower price compared to its competitors, and first-party game library, but criticism for its user interface, hardware performance, and the GamePad's short battery life and its misuse in games and software. It was a commercial failure; with 13.56 million units sold worldwide, it is Nintendo's lowest-selling home console, and its second-lowest-selling console overall, ahead of the Virtual Boy. While first party games saw moderately high sales attributed to a small but "loyal and passionate fan base for Nintendo-developed content", the console's poor sales have been attributed to a weak launch game lineup, limited third-party support, and lackluster marketing that failed to clearly distinguish it from the original Wii.

Nintendo discontinued the Wii U on January 31, 2017. On March 3, it released a successor, the Nintendo Switch, which retained and refined concepts introduced with the Wii U.

== History ==
=== Development ===
The system was first conceived in 2008 after Nintendo recognized several limitations and challenges with the Wii, such as the general public's perception that the system catered primarily to a casual audience. With the Wii U, Nintendo wished to bring back core gamers. Game designer Shigeru Miyamoto admitted that the lack of HD and limited network infrastructure for the Wii also contributed to the system being regarded in a separate class to the PlayStation 3 and Xbox 360, the Wii's competitors. It was clear that a new console would have to be developed to accommodate significant structural changes, but ideas on which direction to take for the new console led to much debate within the company, and the project started over from scratch on several occasions. The concept of a touchscreen embedded within the controller was originally inspired by the blue light on the Wii disc slot that illuminates to indicate new messages. Miyamoto and his team wanted to include a small screen to provide game feedback and status messages to players (similar to the VMU for Sega's Dreamcast). Much later in development, this was expanded to a full screen that could display the game being played in its entirety, a concept that was suggested but not financially viable earlier in the project.

Public rumors surrounding the console began to appear in 2008, with speculation of an upcoming revision of the Wii scheduled for 2011 known as the "Wii HD", that would support high-definition video and have a Blu-ray drive. However, Nintendo president Satoru Iwata later stated that he saw "no significant reason" to include HD into the Wii and that such an addition would be better suited for a successor. Miyamoto also expressed Nintendo's interest in working with HD graphics, but clarified that the company is primarily focused on gameplay. In October 2009, Miyamoto said that Nintendo had no concrete plans about its next console, but thought that the new system would continue to feature motion controls and also expected its interface to be "more compact" and cheaper. Iwata also mentioned that the Wii's successor might be 3D-compatible but concluded that the adoption rates of 3D televisions should increase to at least 30% first. In 2010, Nintendo of America president Reggie Fils-Aimé commented that he felt "confident the Wii home entertainment console has a very long life in front of it" and declared that a successor would not be launched in the near future.

After its E3 2010 presentation, Iwata revealed to the BBC that Nintendo would begin announcing a new console once it ran "out of ideas with the current hardware and cannot give users any more meaningful surprises with the technology". Later, at an investor's meeting, he disclosed that Nintendo was "of course studying and developing the next console to Wii", but it was simultaneously keeping its concepts secret because it was "really important for [Nintendo's] business to positively surprise people." Fils-Aimé also stated that Nintendo's next home console would likely not feature stereoscopic 3D, based on the 3D technology Nintendo had experimented with.

In April 2011, an uncredited source indicated that Nintendo was planning to unveil a successor to the Wii known as "Project Café" at its E3 2011 presentation. Café was claimed to be a high definition console, and to also have backward compatibility with Wii software. Conflicting reports also surrounded the console's new controller, with reports suggesting a tablet-like device with an embedded touchscreen and the ability to stream games from the console directly to the screen, while others reported that the controller would be similar to the GameCube controller and feature dual analog sticks, shoulder buttons, and triggers.

=== Announcement ===
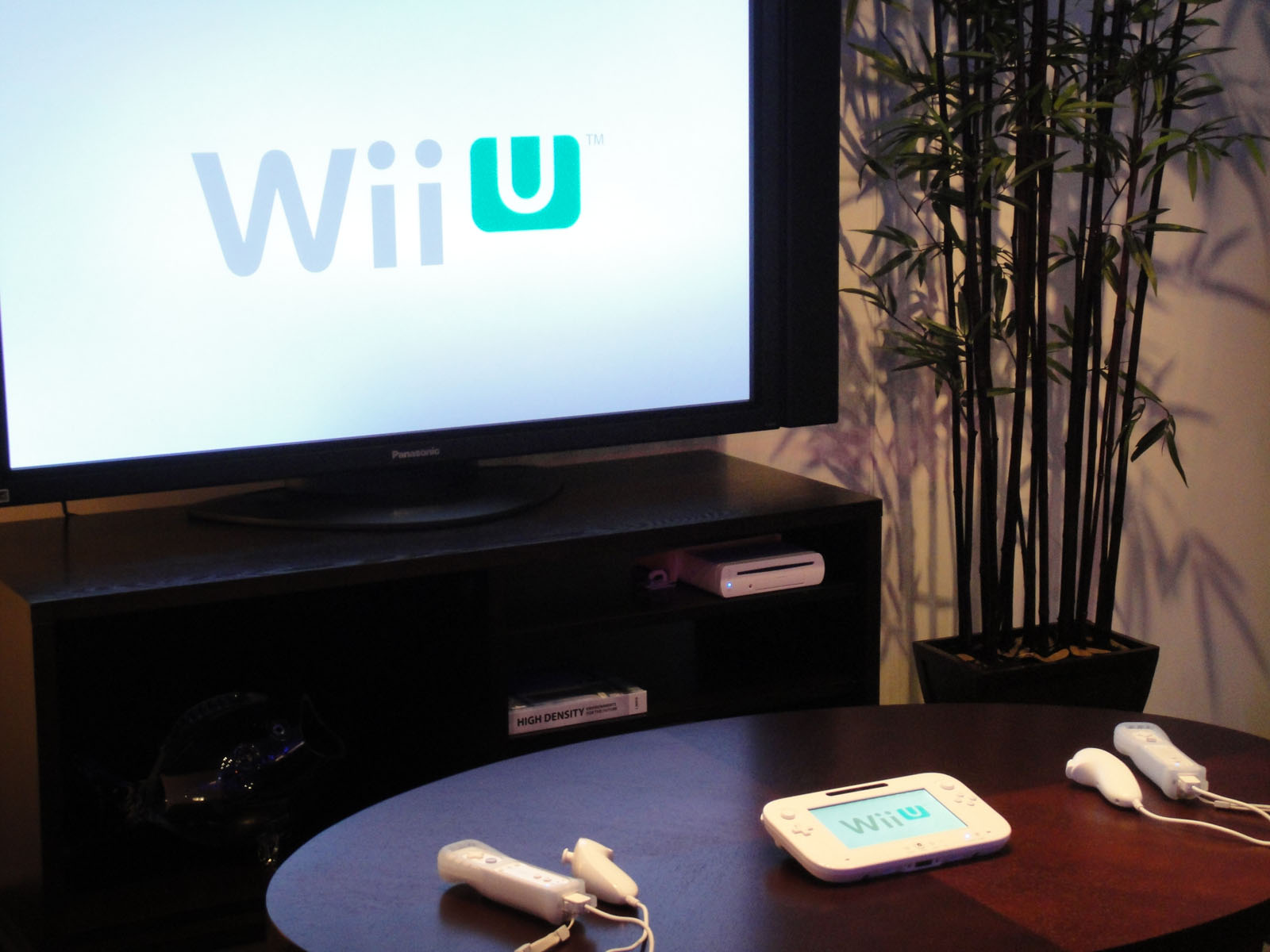
A display of the console and GamePad (referred to as the "New Controller" at the time) at E3 2011

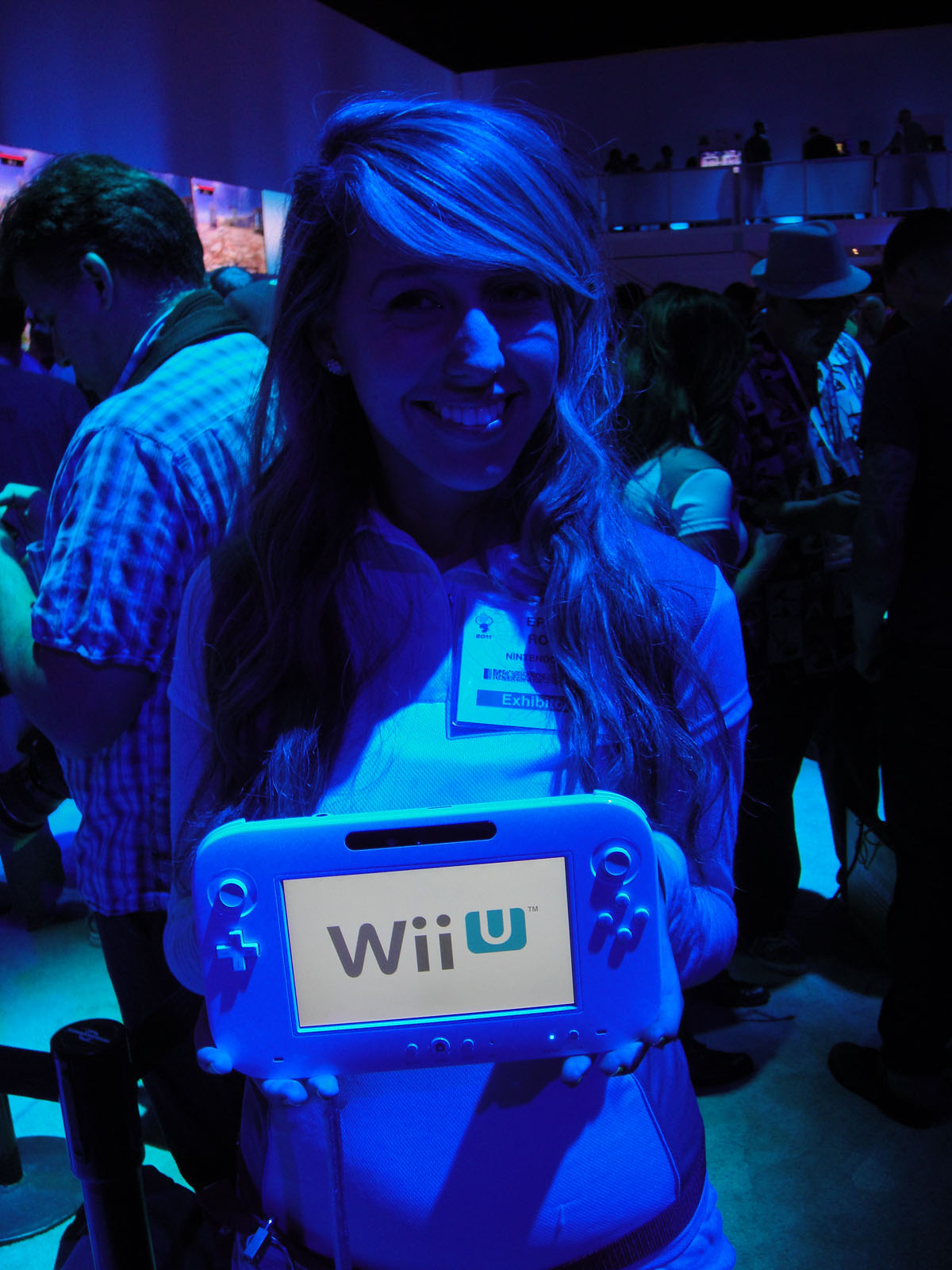
The Wii U GamePad prototype originally shown at the same convention

On April 25, 2011, Nintendo released an official statement announcing a system to succeed the Wii to be released during 2012, and that playable console units would be present at E3 2011. Speaking at an investor's conference, Iwata stated the Wii successor would "offer something new for home game systems." He also confirmed that the device would not launch in fiscal year 2012, meaning that it would release after April 2012. In early June, Nikkei issued a report confirming earlier rumors that the new console would feature a controller with a 6-inch touchscreen that would give tablet-like controls to games, as well as a rechargeable battery and camera. Project Café was officially unveiled as the Wii U during Nintendo's press conference at E3 2011 by Nintendo of America president Reggie Fils-Aimé; he explained that the Wii U would be "a system we will all enjoy together, but also one that's tailor-made for you". The rumored tablet controller was also shown at this time. No first-party games for the Wii U were announced during the presentation, but several major third-party studios announced games for Wii U in a pre-recorded video, the possibility of a new Super Smash Bros. game was teased, and Electronic Arts' then-CEO John Riccitiello appeared on-stage to discuss the company's prospective plans for products on the Wii U. Prototype hardware and a series of tech demos were available to attendees, showcasing gameplay concepts and the technological capabilities of the console—including a The Legend of Zelda-themed graphics demo, and New Super Mario Bros. Mii.

In the two days following the unveiling of the Wii U, Nintendo's stock fell nearly 10% to levels not seen since 2006. Some analysts expressed skepticism in regards to the addition of a touch-screen, expressing concern that the controller would be less affordable and less innovative than the original Wii Remote. When asked about whether or not the Wii U was going to support stereographic 3D via 3D televisions, Iwata stated that it was "not the area we are focusing on." On January 26, 2012, Iwata announced that the Wii U would be launched by the end of the 2012 shopping season in all major regions and that its final specifications would be revealed at E3 2012. He also stated that the console would feature a unified online system known as Nintendo Network, which would feature user account support as opposed to the use of friend codes. Nintendo Network would also provide the framework for online multiplayer interactions, add-on content, as well as online distribution of applications and video games. Iwata mentioned that the Wii U GamePad would support NFC, which would allow the system to wirelessly interact with figurines and cards. It would also allow for microtransactions to take place wirelessly using credit cards with NFC support.

On September 13, 2012, Nintendo announced that the Wii U would launch in Japan on December 8, 2012. Later that day, Nintendo announced that the North American launch date would be November 18, 2012. Nintendo of Europe and Nintendo Australia also announced that the Wii U would be released in both regions on November 30, 2012. In an interview with GameSpot the next day, Nintendo of America's Senior Product Marketing Manager Bill Trinen admitted that Nintendo's pre-launch marketing and presentations of the Wii U had focused too much on the GamePad, to the extent that some consumers mistook the device as an accessory for the existing Wii rather than a component of an entirely new platform. Trinen ensured that future promotional material for the console, including its packaging, would emphasize both the Wii U console and GamePad.

=== Release ===
The Wii U was originally released in two bundles: the Basic bundle and the Deluxe (U.S.) / Premium (WW) bundle. The Basic bundle contains a white Wii U with 8 GB of storage, a white Wii U GamePad, stylus and an HDMI cable, while the Deluxe (U.S.) / Premium (WW) contains a black Wii U with 32 GB of storage, a black GamePad and stylus, an HDMI cable, and adds a Nintendo Network Premium subscription, the Nintendo Land game (except Japan), as well as stands for the console and controller and the Sensor Bar (except Japan). The Wii U launched in North America priced at US$299.99 for the Basic Set and US$349.99 for the Deluxe Set. The system launched in Europe, Australia and South Africa, with European pricing set by retailers. The system launched in Japan priced at ¥26,250 for the Basic Set and ¥31,500 for the Premium Set.

=== Post-release ===
On July 13, 2013, Nintendo released a white version of the Premium Pack in Japan, as well as an official battery pack and charger dock for the Wii Remote. The battery pack is capable of about 3 hours of gameplay before needing to be recharged. On July 25, the company released an improved battery pack for the Wii U GamePad. In contrast to the standard 1500mAh battery bundled with the console, the new 2550mAh battery pack increases longevity to between five and eight hours before needing to be recharged. On August 28, 2013, Nintendo announced that the Deluxe (U.S.) / Premium (WW) 32 GB model would drop in price from US$349.99 to US$299.99 in North America. The price drop took effect on September 20, 2013. In Europe, Nintendo did not confirm a formal price cut since individual retailers set their own prices. However, starting October 4, 2013, the company reduced the wholesale price of the system to retailers. Coinciding with the system's price cut, Nintendo released a limited edition The Legend of Zelda: The Wind Waker HD Wii U Deluxe Set bundle. The bundle included a black Wii U console with 32 GB of storage, a black Wii U GamePad decorated with a golden Triforce and other thematic symbols, a download code for the game and, in North America, a digital copy of The Legend of Zelda: Hyrule Historia, a collector's book about The Legend of Zelda series. In Europe, Nintendo also released a limited edition Lego City Undercover Wii U Premium Pack bundle. Both European bundles featured a 7-day trial of the Wii Karaoke U service. Nintendo did not cut the price of the Wii U in Australia or New Zealand nor did it release any of the previous bundles in the regions.

On October 31, 2013, Nintendo introduced two new Wii U Premium Pack bundles in Japan, called the Family Set. The first included either a black or white Wii U console with 32 GB of storage, a black or white Wii U GamePad, New Super Mario Bros. U and Wii Party U preloaded, a black or white Wii Remote, a Wii Sensor Bar, and a 30-day trial of the Wii Karaoke U service. The second bundle included all of the previous one's contents, additionally preloaded with Wii Fit U and including Nintendo's official Fit Meter pedometer (with the Wii Balance Board available separately). On November 1, 2013, Nintendo released a Mario & Luigi Deluxe Set in North America with the intention of replacing the original Wii U Deluxe Set, which included a copy of Nintendo Land. The Mario & Luigi bundle contains both New Super Mario Bros. U and New Super Luigi U packaged as a "2 in 1" disc alongside a black Wii U console with 32 GB of storage and black Wii U GamePad controller. The bundle was later released in Europe on November 8. On November 14, Nintendo released a Just Dance 2014 Basic Pack bundle in Australia and New Zealand. It contains a white Wii U console with 8 GB of storage, a white Wii U GamePad and Wii Remote Plus controllers, a Sensor Bar, and disc versions of both Ubisoft's Just Dance 2014 and Nintendo Land. The bundle was later released in Europe on November 22. On November 15, Nintendo released a Wii Party U Wii U Basic Pack bundle in Europe. It features a white Wii U console with 8 GB of storage, a white Wii U GamePad and Wii Remote Plus controllers, a Sensor Bar, and disc versions of both Wii Party U and Nintendo Land. On November 15, Nintendo also released a Skylanders: Swap Force Wii U Basic Set bundle in North America. It contains white Wii U with 8 GB of storage, Activision's Skylanders Swap Force game, a Portal of Power, three Skylanders figures, a collector poster, trading cards and sticker sheets, and a Nintendo Land game disc. The bundle was released in Australia and New Zealand on November 21.

On November 26, 2013, the Wii U was released in Brazil. However, the system is only available in the black Deluxe Set in the region. On January 10, 2015, Nintendo announced that it would cease selling consoles and games in Brazil due to the high cost of doing business in the country. On May 30, 2014, Nintendo released a Mario Kart 8 Deluxe (U.S.) / Premium (WW) Set bundle in Europe and North America. It features a black Wii U console with 32 GB of storage, a black Wii U GamePad, a copy of Mario Kart 8, a Sensor Bar, and special edition red Wii Wheel (North America only). Additionally, registering the game on Club Nintendo before July 31, 2014, presents the buyer a free Wii U game from a selection of four in North America and ten in Europe. The bundle was released in Australia and New Zealand on May 31.

=== Discontinuation ===
In June 2015, the basic Wii U was discontinued in Japan, and replaced by a 32 GB "Premium" set that includes white hardware and a Wii Remote Plus.

Nintendo had planned to diminish production of the Wii U ahead of the release of the Nintendo Switch. Nintendo formally announced the end of its production on January 31, 2017.

The ability to purchase content through the Nintendo eShop was discontinued on March 27, 2023. Online functionality was discontinued at 00:00 UTC on April 9, 2024, with the servers shutting down at 02:00 UTC that same day.

== Hardware ==
=== Console ===
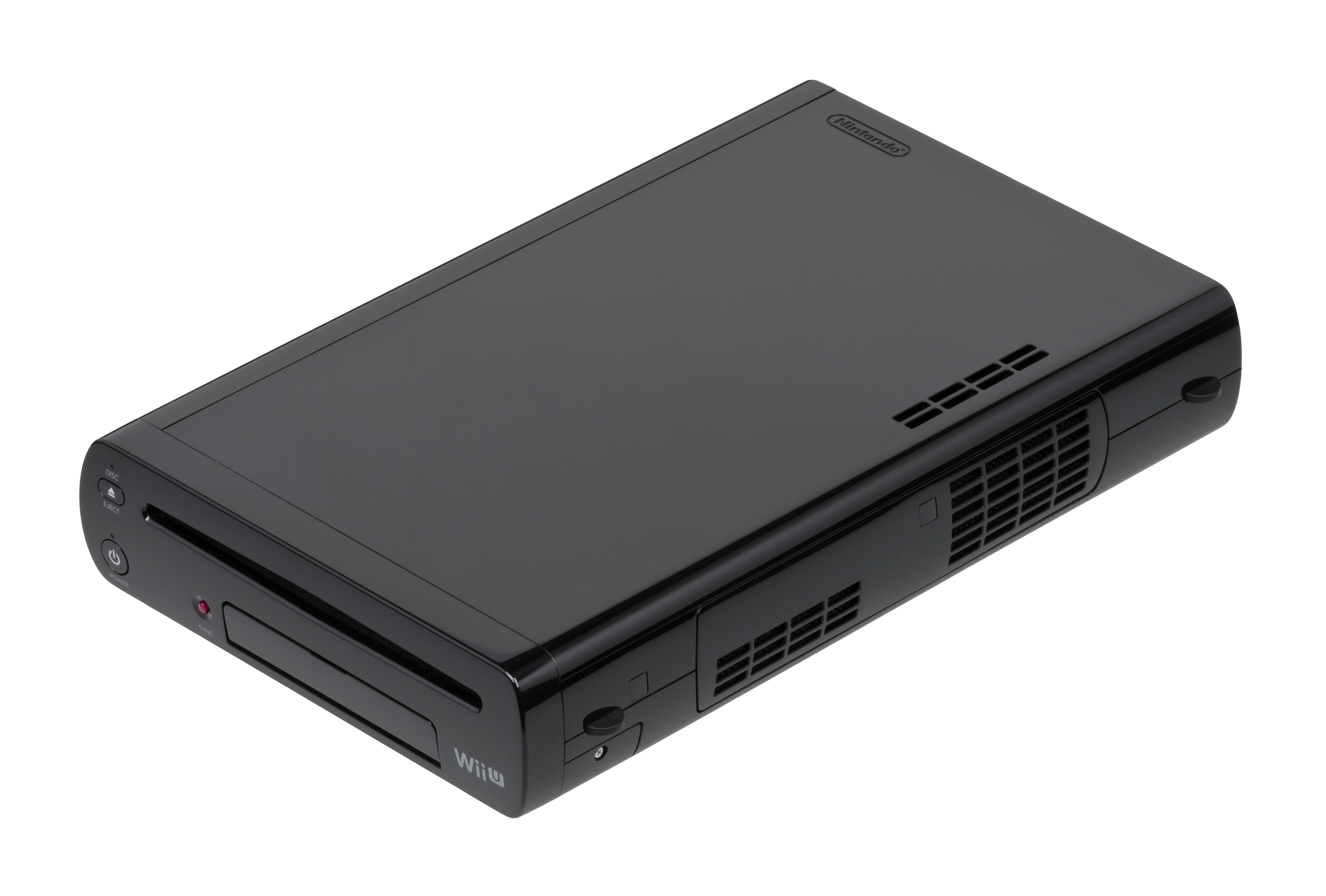
The black Wii U console, with 32 GB of internal storage

The Wii U uses a custom multi-chip module (MCM) developed by AMD, IBM and Renesas in co-operation with Nintendo IRD and Nintendo Technology Development. The MCM combines an "Espresso" central processing unit (CPU) and a "Latte" graphics chip (GPU), as well as a SEEPROM memory chip. The Espresso CPU, designed by IBM, consists of a PowerPC 750-based tri-core processor with 3 MB of shared L2 cache memory and clocked at approximately 1.24 GHz. (Note: Neither Nintendo, IBM nor AMD has revealed detailed specifications, such as the number of cores, clock rate, or cache sizes.) Despite being based on the PowerPC 750, the Espresso also shares some architectural concepts with the POWER7 architecture, such as the use of eDRAM cache and being manufactured at a 45 nm node. (Note: Official reports made by IBM only confirm that the chip contains "a lot" of eDRAM and "the same processor technology found in Watson".) The Latte graphics chip contains both a "GX2" GPGPU, which runs Wii U applications, and a "GX" GPU, which enables backward compatibility with Wii games. The GX2, designed by AMD, is based on the Radeon R600/R700 architecture and is clocked at approximately 550 MHz.. It contains 32 MB of eDRAM cache memory, which can also act as an L3 cache for the CPU. The GX, originally designed by ArtX, contains a 1 MB and a 2 MB bank of eSRAM cache memory. The Latte chip also includes a secondary custom ARM9 processor with 96 KB of SRAM memory that handles system tasks in the background during gameplay or while the system is in sleep mode, and dedicated hardware audio DSP module.The console contains 2 GB of DDR3 system memory consisting of four 512 MB DRAM chips with a maximum bandwidth of 12.8 GB/s. This is 20 times the amount found in the Wii. Of this, 1 GB is reserved for the operating system and is unavailable to games. The memory architecture allows the CPU and GPU to access both the main DDR3 memory pool and the eDRAM cache memory pool on the GPU, removing the need for separate, dedicated memory pools. The console includes either an 8 GB (Basic) or 32 GB (Deluxe (NA) / Premium (WW)) internal eMMC flash memory, expandable via SD memory cards up to 32 GB and USB external hard disk drives up to 2 TB. The Nintendo Wii U can also use DVD-RAM for extended storage over USB.

The Wii U features 802.11 b/g /n wireless network connectivity and support for Fast Ethernet with an accessory, Bluetooth 4.0, a total of four USB 2.0 ports, and an SD/SDHC memory card slot. An additional power port is also included to power the Wii Sensor Bar, an auxiliary infrared emitter used by Wii Remote peripherals for motion tracking. Video output options include 1080p, 1080i, 720p, 576i, 480p and 480i, through HDMI 1.4 and component video (YP_{B}P_{R}, D-Terminal and RGB SCART) or 576i, 480i anamorphic widescreen through composite video (S-Video, SCART and D-Terminal). Audio output options include six-channel 5.1 linear PCM surround sound and analog stereo. The console also supports stereoscopic (3D) images and video.

=== Controllers ===
An illustration of the Wii U GamePad (White)

The Wii U GamePad is the console's primary controller: its main feature is a built-in 6.2 inch (15.7 cm) resistive touchscreen, which can be used as a companion to games being played on a television, or as a means of playing games on the GamePad itself without a television. The GamePad is designed to enable a concept referred to by Nintendo as "asymmetric gaming": in multiplayer games, a player using the GamePad may have a different gameplay objective and experience than other players.

The GamePad's display contents are rendered on the Wii U itself, and streamed wirelessly as video to the GamePad. The GamePad also supports near field communications; cards and specially designed figurines, such as Nintendo's Amiibo line, can be used with the GamePad to interact with games. In Japan, it can also be used for contactless payments from eShop with Suica cards.

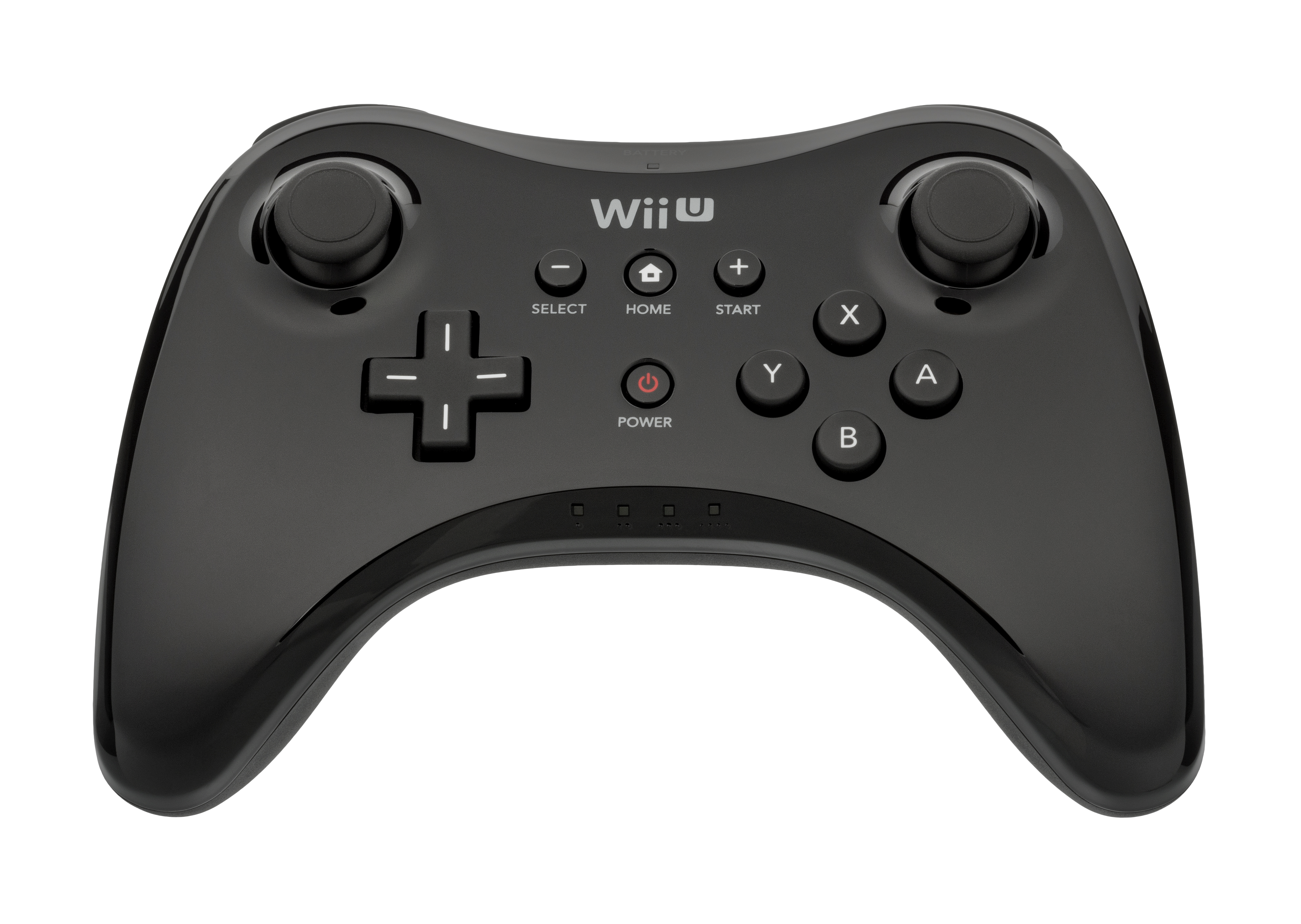
The Wii U Pro Controller, a more conventional controller compared to the GamePad

A new Wii U Pro Controller was released alongside the Wii U. The Wii U Pro Controller is an updated version of the Wii's Classic Controller that is designed to appeal to "hardcore" players, with a more traditional gamepad design that resembles those used by the PlayStation and Xbox lines (and in particular, the Xbox 360's controller), and a claimed 80-hour battery life. The Wii U Pro Controller is compatible with supported Wii U games, but is not supported by Wii games.

The Wii U is compatible with existing Wii Remote and Wii Remote Plus controllers, along with their Nunchuk and Classic Controller attachments. A combination of up to four Wii Remotes or Pro Controllers can be used simultaneously, and the console can theoretically support up to two GamePads. Most software requires a Wii Sensor Bar in order to use Wii Remotes with the system, though some aspects, such as Off-TV Play and the Wii Mode, allow the Wii U GamePad to detect Wii Remotes. The Wii U does not support GameCube controllers – while a USB adapter accessory allows GameCube controllers to be used on the console in Super Smash Bros. for Wii U, it is not compatible with any other software.

== Software ==
The Wii U's main menu has two main components: by default, the GamePad displays a home screen consisting of a grid with shortcuts to games and apps, while the television screen displays a lobby (WaraWara Plaza) populated by other users' Miis. The two displays can be switched between the television screen and GamePad.

Pressing the controller's "Home" button suspends the current game or app and opens the Home Menu: it shows basic information (such as the current time, controller battery levels, and notifications), and allows access to several "multitasking" functions, including the Nintendo eShop, Miiverse, download manager, a web browser, and the user's friends list. To play Wii games, the user must enter "Wii Mode", a legacy mode that emulates the Wii's system software and Wii Menu interface. Initially, Wii Mode could only be used on the television screen, but the October 2013 firmware update enables Wii Mode to be used off-TV. Either way, Wii controllers must be used.

=== Online services ===
The Wii U used the Nintendo Network platform for online services (replacing the friend code system of the Wii), enabling online multiplayer, downloading and purchasing games or apps via Nintendo eShop, video chat using the GamePad's camera and the Wii U Chat service, and other services. Up to twelve accounts can be created per console.

A social networking service known as Miiverse was integrated into the Wii U's system software; it allowed players to interact and share content in game-specific communities using their Mii as an avatar. Miiverse allowed users to share accomplishments, screenshots, drawings, and hand-written notes. Select games are integrated with Miiverse, where social interactions can also occur within the game, or appear within their content (such as in Splatoon, where drawn posts can appear as graffiti on walls in its settings). Miiverse was moderated through software filtering as well as a human resource team in order to ensure that the content shared by users is appropriate and that no spoilers are shared. In order to facilitate this, it was initially stated that comments posted could take up to 30 minutes to appear on Miiverse.

=== Multimedia integration ===
The Wii U supported online video services through apps, such as Amazon Video, Crunchyroll, Hulu, Netflix, and YouTube. The Wii U does not support playback of DVDs or Blu-rays; Iwata explained that the decision to exclude these formats was motivated primarily by patent licensing fees, and the fact that such functionality would be redundant to DVD and Blu-ray players that users may already own.

The Nintendo TVii service allowed program listings from a user's television provider to be aggregated with online video on demand services into an electronic program guide with recommendations and search functionality, and the ability to use the GamePad's infrared functionality to tune a set-top box to a particular program. The app also provided integration with IMDb, Rotten Tomatoes, and Wikipedia to provide additional information, and social connectivity through Facebook, Twitter, or Miiverse. TVii was made available with the Wii U's release in Japan on December 8, 2012, and in North America on December 20, 2012. Following delays, a European launch was cancelled.

TVii was discontinued in North America on August 11, 2015, and was discontinued in Japan on November 8, 2017. The Netflix app was discontinued on July 1, 2021. The YouTube app was delisted from the Nintendo eShop on April 27, 2022, and discontinued on October 27, 2022.

Wii Street U was an app that used Google Maps and released as a digital download on the Nintendo eShop. The software allows players to use Google Street View using the GamePad. Upon initial release, the software was available for free until October 31, 2013, and the software was ended altogether on January 29, 2016, when it was announced that service for Wii Street U would be discontinued effectively on March 31, 2016.

Wii Street U was announced in 2013 as part of Nintendo's Nintendo Web Framework, and is one of the first applications to use it.

== Games ==
Wii U games could be downloaded digitally through Nintendo eShop, or at retail on physical media. Retail copies of Wii U games are distributed on Wii U Optical Disc, a proprietary high-density optical disc format co-developed with Panasonic. The format is similar in design and specifications to a Blu-ray, with a capacity of 25 GB per layer, but the discs themselves have a soft, rounded rim. Unlike previous Nintendo consoles, game manuals were only available digitally. The console is region locked; software purchased in a region can be only played on that region's hardware. New games in Nintendo's flagship franchises (including Super Mario, Donkey Kong and The Legend of Zelda), as well as several Wii series games (including Wii Sports Club, Wii Fit U and Wii Party U) have been released, in addition to many original games and third-party-developed games. Nintendo has received third-party support from companies such as Ubisoft, Sega, Warner Bros. Interactive Entertainment, Activision Blizzard, and Capcom, and various independent developers such as Two Tribes. As of late July 2016, there have been 39 first-party and 118 third-party Wii U games physically released in the United States; both figures are the lowest for any Nintendo console.

A total of 103.60 million Wii U games have been sold worldwide since March 31, 2023, with ten games surpassing the million-unit mark. The highest selling game is Mario Kart 8 at 8.46 million units, followed by Super Mario 3D World at 5.89 million units, and New Super Mario Bros. U at 5.82 million units. Super Smash Bros. for Wii U was the fastest selling Wii U game as of November 25, 2014.

=== Launch games ===
The Wii U was launched with 29 games in North America, 26 games in Europe, 25 games in Australia, and 11 games in Japan. Some download-only games were also available on launch day for the Wii U via Nintendo eShop. An additional 30 games were announced for release during the system's launch window, which included the three months after the system's launch date.

Key:

- ^{NA} North America
- ^{JP} Japan
- ^{PAL} PAL region (broadly)

List of Wii U launch games by region released
Launch game	Region(s) released on launch day
Assassin's Creed III	^{JP, NA, PAL}
Batman: Arkham City – Armored Edition	^{JP, NA, PAL}
Ben 10: Omniverse	^{NA, PAL}
Call of Duty: Black Ops II	^{NA, PAL}
Darksiders II	^{NA, PAL}
Epic Mickey 2: The Power of Two	^{NA, PAL}
ESPN Sports Connection; Sports Connection^{PAL}	^{NA, PAL}
FIFA 13	^{NA, PAL}
Funky Barn	^{NA, PAL}
Game Party Champions	^{NA, PAL}
Just Dance 4	^{NA, PAL}
Madden NFL 13	^{NA}
Mass Effect 3: Special Edition	^{NA, PAL}
Monster Hunter 3 Ultimate	^{JP}
NBA 2K13	^{NA, PAL}
New Super Mario Bros. U	^{JP, NA, PAL}
Ninja Gaiden 3: Razor's Edge	^{JP, NA}
Nintendo Land	^{JP, NA, PAL}
Rabbids Land	^{NA}
Scribblenauts Unlimited	^{NA, PAL}
Sing Party	^{NA}
Skylanders: Giants	^{NA, PAL}
Sonic & All-Stars Racing Transformed	^{NA, PAL}
Tank! Tank! Tank!	^{NA, PAL}
Tekken Tag Tournament 2: Wii U Edition	^{JP, NA, PAL}
Transformers: Prime – The Game	^{NA}
Warriors Orochi 3 Hyper	^{JP, NA}
Wipeout 3	^{NA}
Your Shape: Fitness Evolved 2013	^{NA}
ZombiU	^{JP, NA, PAL}

=== Virtual Console ===
In January 2013, Nintendo announced that NES and Super NES games would be made available for the Virtual Console service on the Wii U in April 2013 and would include the option to use Off-TV Play on the GamePad. On March 26, 2014, Game Boy Advance games were confirmed and started to appear on the eShop the following month. Nintendo 64 and Nintendo DS games were added in April 2015.

=== Backward compatibility ===
The Wii U is compatible with all Wii games and Wii accessories such as the Wii Remote (Plus), Wii Nunchuk, and the Wii Balance Board. It is possible to migrate most downloaded software and save files from a Wii to a Wii U. Although Wii games can be displayed on the GamePad's screen, they can only be controlled using a Wii controller, and not the GamePad's controller.

Users cannot boot Wii games immediately; instead, they navigate to a Wii sandbox from the Wii U menu. The Wii U variant of the Wii system software includes the Mii Channel, Wii Shop Channel, and a utility to transfer data from a Wii console to a Wii U. The Wii U does not support upscaling for Wii games. Unlike the Wii, the Wii U is not compatible with GameCube games, although it is possible to restore this functionality through a homebrew application. A USB GameCube controller adapter with four ports was released exclusively for use with Super Smash Bros. for Wii U, though it does not support any other Wii or Wii U games.

== Development tools ==
The Nintendo Web Framework, unveiled in 2013, is a toolset that uses modern web technology (WebKit, HTML5, and JavaScript) to simplify the process of porting games to the Wii U's GamePad and TV. It was designed to make web-based games easier to port to the system than it would to code specifically for the Wii U. Nintendo also released a custom Unity package to allow game developers to quickly make games on Unity for the Wii U. These tools are no longer available on the Nintendo Developer Portal, however users who have these tools downloaded are still able to use them.

== Reception ==
John Teti of The A.V. Club's Gameological Society considered the Wii U a compelling video game system which lacks focus, citing Nintendo Land as "ideas act[ing] in service of the technology". Ben Gilbert of Engadget stated that Nintendo delivered on its promise of releasing "a modern HD gaming console" but noted that "there are also some major missteps and half-baked ideas: a befuddling Friends List/Miiverse connection, a complete lack of many system-wide console standards (group chat, achievements, the ability to play non-game disc-based media) and a game controller that lasts only 3.5 hours", and stated that he could not give a complete assessment of the console with online components such as Nintendo TVii missing at launch. Similarly, TechRadar praised the system's GamePad functionality and HD graphics, but criticized the limited battery power on the GamePad, and the insufficient number of top-tier launch games. Some industry figures do not consider the Wii U to be an eighth-generation console, with many citing the hardware's processing speed. However, Fils-Aimé has noted that similar comments were made in 2006 when the Wii first launched.

Following the launch of other eighth-generation consoles, the PlayStation 4 and Xbox One, in November 2013, some critics suggested that the Wii U would continue to struggle as it lacked the third-party support of its rivals. In a December 2013 article, Chris Suellentrop of The New York Times argued that the Wii U was the only new console with a video game worth playing—Super Mario 3D World—which he described as being "the best Mario game in years". Despite the praise, he noted that "one great game won't save a console", and although other games exist on the Wii U, he admitted that its original lineup "was still pretty thin". Time writer Matt Peckham said that the Wii U was the system of choice to pick up during that Christmas season, praising the console's game lineup, affordable price, Off-TV Play, the absence of subscription fees for its online services, backward compatibility and media features. However, he noted that the system still needs a price cut and an improved first and third-party software lineup. CNET also noted that the Wii U had a better lineup of games and lower price in comparison to its competitors, mainly due to its one-year head start.

== Sales ==
Life-to-date number of hardware and software units shipped, in millions
Date	Japan		Americas		Other		Total	
Date	Hardware	Software	Hardware	Software	Hardware	Software	Hardware	Software
2012-12-31	0.83	1.48	1.32	6.40	0.90	3.82	3.06	11.69
2013-03-31	0.92	1.73	1.52	7.28	1.01	4.40	3.45	13.42
2013-06-30	1.01	1.91	1.58	7.80	1.02	4.73	3.61	14.44
2013-09-30	1.15	2.57	1.75	10.97	1.01	6.17	3.91	19.71
2013-12-31	1.75	5.21	2.61	15.23	1.49	8.94	5.86	29.37
2014-03-31	1.81	5.62	2.81	16.98	1.56	9.67	6.17	32.28
2014-06-30	1.87	6.43	3.08	19.28	1.73	10.95	6.68	36.67
2014-09-30	1.97	6.96	3.43	22.58	1.88	12.13	7.29	41.67
2014-12-31	2.30	8.48	4.45	29.25	2.46	15.15	9.20	52.87
2015-03-31	2.33	8.95	4.65	31.59	2.56	16.13	9.54	56.68
2015-06-30	2.48	9.97	4.85	33.65	2.68	17.61	10.01	61.23
2015-09-30	2.66	11.00	5.21	38.28	2.87	19.77	10.73	69.05
2015-12-31	3.08	12.68	6.10	43.76	3.42	22.86	12.60	79.30
2016-03-31	3.13	13.48	6.20	46.38	3.47	24.18	12.80	84.04
2016-06-30	3.21	14.08	6.29	48.84	3.53	25.79	13.02	88.72
2016-09-30	3.30	14.55	6.41	50.62	3.65	27.18	13.36	92.35
2016-12-31	3.34	15.10	6.49	52.84	3.73	28.59	13.56	96.52

By December 2019, Nintendo reported life-time sales of 13.56 million Wii U console units and by March 2023 103.60 million software units worldwide.

=== Launch ===
During its first week of release in the United States, Nintendo sold its entire allotment of over 400,000 units and sold a total of 425,000 units for the month of November, according to the NPD Group. It also sold over 40,000 consoles in the UK in its first weekend. In Japan, over 600,000 Wii U units were sold during December 2012. Nearly 890,000 Wii U units were sold in the United States after 41 days on the market. From the Wii U's launch till December 31, 2012, Nintendo reported that 3.06 million consoles and 11.69 million software units had been shipped worldwide. In January 2013, Nintendo sold 57,000 Wii U units in the US. By comparison, the original Wii sold 435,000 in January 2007, also two months after launch. Initial sales numbers in the U.S. and other territories were lower than expected, resulting in Nintendo cutting sales projections for fiscal year 2013 by 17%, from 5.5 million to 4 million; the system actually ended up selling 3.5 million units. During the first quarter of 2013, Nintendo reported that 390,000 consoles and 1.73 million software units were shipped worldwide. From March to June 2013, the system sold approximately 160,000 units, which was down 51% from the three months prior. During the second quarter of 2013, Nintendo reported that 160,000 consoles and 1.03 million software units were shipped worldwide.

=== Loss of support ===
In May 2013, Electronic Arts announced that it was reducing support for the Wii U and had no games in development for it, but then partially reconsidered this decision a few days later, with EA's CFO announcing that "We are building titles for the Nintendo console, but not anywhere near as many as we are for PlayStation or Xbox". At E3 2013, Ubisoft revealed that it was not going to make any more exclusives for the Wii U until sales of the console improved, though it stated shortly thereafter that it was still a "big supporter" of the Wii U, and planned to release as many Wii U games in 2013 as it did in 2012. In July 2013, Bethesda Softworks announced that it had no games in development for the Wii U, with Bethesda VP of PR and marketing Pete Hines explaining: "It depends on the games that we are making and how we think it aligns with that console, and how the hardware aligns with the other stuff we are making". This explanation was later refined to being largely due to the hardware. Contrarily, Activision has stated that it will "do everything they can" to support the system. At the end of July 2013, Asda, the second-largest supermarket chain in the UK, confirmed that it had no plans to stock the Wii U, but would still stock games "on a title by title merit basis". Despite this, many specialist retailers continued to emphasize their support, with Game CEO Martyn Gibbs saying "We fully support all Nintendo products, including Wii U."

=== Price cut and first-party games ===
Following the system's $50 price cut and the release of The Legend of Zelda: The Wind Waker HD on September 20, 2013, Wii U sales in North America saw a 200% rise over August. From July to September 2013, the system sold approximately 300,000 units, which was up 87% from the three months prior. Despite only having sold 460,000 consoles since April, Nintendo maintained its 9 million Wii U sales forecast for the fiscal year through March 2014. Wii U software showed improvement in the Q2 period, reaching 5.27 million units, a 400% jump on the previous quarter. Nintendo credited the software growth to key first-party releases like Pikmin 3 and The Legend of Zelda: The Wind Waker HD. During the third quarter of 2013, Nintendo reported that 300,000 consoles and 5.27 million software units were shipped worldwide. In October 2013, online retailer Play.com announced that its Wii U sales saw a 75% sales increase. The company also predicted that the Wii U would be more popular than its competition, the PlayStation 4 and Xbox One, among children during the holiday season. Following the release of Wii Party U on October 31 in Japan, weekly Wii U sales spiked to 38,802 units sold. On November 29, 2013, Nintendo of France deputy general manager Philippe Lavoué announced that the Wii U had sold approximately 175,000 units in France since launch. During the first two weeks of December, the Wii U was the top performing home console in Japan, with 123,665 units sold. After one year in the market, the Wii U had sold approximately 150,000 units in the United Kingdom. According to the NPD Group, Wii U sales in November increased by 340% over sales in October in North America, selling approximately 220,700 units sold in that month. According to several publications, including NPD Group, December 2013 was the best-selling Wii U month in the US since its launch, selling around 481,000 units. Independent estimates put the number of Wii U consoles sold by the end of 2013 between 4.5 and 5.2 million. During the fourth quarter of 2013, Nintendo reported that 1.95 million consoles and 9.96 million software units were shipped worldwide.

In January 2014, citing lower-than-expected sales during the 2013 holiday season, Nintendo announced that Wii U sales forecasts for fiscal year 2014 had been cut from 9 million units to 2.8 million. In light of this announcement, the Wii U's long-term viability had been called into question. In February 2014, Nintendo revealed that the Wii U had improved about 180% in year-over-year sales in the United States due to the launch of Donkey Kong Country: Tropical Freeze, which sold 130,000 copies. By February 26, Wii U sales had surpassed those of the Xbox 360 in Japan. In March 2014, Nintendo sold just over 70,000 Wii U units, tracking it down 50% less than the GameCube and 90% less than the Wii during equivalent time periods. During the month, total worldwide sales of the PlayStation 4 surpassed those of the Wii U. During the first quarter of 2014, Nintendo reported that 310,000 consoles and 2.91 million software units were shipped worldwide. During an annual investors' meeting, Satoru Iwata revealed Nintendo's projection of 3.6 million Wii U unit sales during the fiscal year ending March 2015. On May 22, 2014, Nintendo France announced that sales were 50% higher compared to the last year. With Mario Kart 8 being Nintendo's biggest game launch, Wii U console sales reportedly increased by 666% in the United Kingdom, with the Mario Kart 8 console bundle representing 82% of the region's Wii U console sales for the week. NPD Group reported that in the United States, when comparing the month of June 2013 to the same month in 2014, Wii U software sales were up 373% and console sales were up 233%.

The record would be surpassed in November 2014 by Super Smash Bros. for Wii U, which sold 490,000 copies in the United States during its first three days of availability. According to Nintendo of America, December 2014 was Wii U's biggest month in terms of sales in the United States. Hardware sales increased 29%, and software sales increased 75% in comparison to December 2013.

In July 2015, Nintendo announced that as of the end of fiscal third quarter 2015, and nearly three years following its launch, it had shipped over ten million Wii U units worldwide. However, sales of Wii U units during this quarter were down in comparison to the same quarter in 2014, with 470,000 units sold (in comparison to 510,000 in 2014). In comparison, PlayStation 4 and Xbox One had each yielded sales of ten million units after approximately one year from their respective launches.

During the later years of its life cycle, Nintendo tried to broaden the Wii U's appeal by highlighting indie games alongside major franchises in its eShop. In August 2015, Head of 3rd Party Marketing & Communications Damon Baker attributed the moderately high sales of first party games to the console's small but "really loyal and passionate fan base for Nintendo-developed content" that would check the eShop for new releases, and looked to encourage indie developers to publish games which used the system's features to create distinctive experiences that could catch the interest of the aforementioned fan base.

== Legacy ==
The future of the Wii U was left unclear with Nintendo's announcement of a new console platform codenamed NX, which was scheduled to be launched worldwide in March 2017. Nintendo stated that NX would have a "brand-new concept", and not be a direct successor to the Wii U or 3DS product lines; in an interview with the Asahi Shimbun, company president Tatsumi Kimishima reiterated this position and stated that while he thinks that the Wii U business would "slow" after the release of NX, he felt that the console would "have a larger impact than the Wii U". The announcement that The Legend of Zelda: Breath of the Wild was in development for both Wii U and NX further supported Nintendo's view of the console as being a new product line, rather than a replacement for its existing hardware. In a shareholders report in July 2016, Kimishima and Miyamoto stated that they had expected the Wii U to sell one hundred million units, comparable to the success of the Wii, but with only thirteen million units sold worldwide, they would now need to rely on NX to make up for losses on Wii U sales.

The new platform, now known as the Nintendo Switch, was officially announced on October 20, 2016; it is a tablet-like hybrid video game console with detachable controllers, and the ability to be placed in a docking station with an output to allow games to be played on a television. Although it is a hybrid device capable of being used as both a portable and home console, Nintendo officially positioned the platform as "a home gaming system first and foremost". Following the unveiling, a Nintendo spokesperson confirmed that the company would slow production of Wii U hardware, stating that "as we prepare for the launch of Nintendo Switch in March 2017, Nintendo will ship 800,000 Wii U hardware units to the global market for this fiscal year." In mid-November 2016, Nintendo announced that Japanese production of the Wii U would be ending "in the near future", and that shipments to the North American market for the year had already been sent out.

In an interview with Time Magazine in January 2017, Reggie Fils-Aimé commented that the system was "a necessary step, in order to get to Nintendo Switch." Fils-Aimé also compared the system to the GameCube, claiming that the Wii U will be remembered fondly despite its relatively poor sales. Fils-Aimé stated that the commercial failure of the Wii U, specifically the lack of clarity of the Wii U GamePad's function, and the lack of support from third-party publishers to build out its software library, led to how they changed the marketing and promotion for the Switch. He said the Switch's promotion was developed "to make it crystal clear what the proposition is" for the systems, and that they had "strong support" from large and small software developers and publishers to support the new console.

In mid-January 2017, Fils-Aimé told Polygon that Breath of the Wild, which would ship at launch with the Switch in March 2017, would be Nintendo's final first-party game for the Wii U. Nintendo formally announced that production of the Wii U had ended worldwide on January 31, 2017. Despite this, the console had third party releases until 2020. Most of the Wii U's popular exclusive games have been re-released on the Nintendo Switch.
