= List of Nintendo Switch games (0–9) =

This is part of the list of Nintendo Switch games.

== List ==
There are currently 4122 games across this page (0–9), List of Nintendo Switch games (A–Am), List of Nintendo Switch games (An–Az), List of Nintendo Switch games (B), List of Nintendo Switch games (C–G), List of Nintendo Switch games (H–P), and List of Nintendo Switch games (Q–Z).

Key
D Digital only games

List of Nintendo Switch games
Title	Developer(s)	Publisher(s)	Release date	Options	Ref.
.hack//G.U. Last Recode	CyberConnect2	Bandai Namco Entertainment	March 10, 2022		
0 Degrees	EastAsiaSoft, Nerd Games, Kiddo Dev	EastAsiaSoft	May 19, 2021	D	
0x0 Minimalist	Indie Team	GAME NACIONAL	December 4, 2021	D	
#1 Anagrams	Eclipse Games	Eclipse Games	May 14, 2021	D	
#1 Crosswords	Eclipse Games	Eclipse Games	February 12, 2021	D	
#1 Sudokus	Eclipse Games	Eclipse Games	November 25, 2021	D	
1-2-Switch	Nintendo EPD	Nintendo	March 3, 2017		
10 Second Ninja X	Four Circle Interactive	Thalamus Digital	July 30, 2021	D	
10 Second Run Returns	Blue Print	Blue Print	December 21, 2017	D	
1000xRESIST	Sunset Visitor	Fellow Traveller Games	May 9, 2024	D	
100animalease	sewohayami	woof	April 28, 2023	D	
103	Dystopia Interactive	Dystopia Interactive	October 2, 2020	D	
11111Game	Insane Code	Insane Code	June 29, 2023	D	
112 Operator	Games Operators	SONKA	July 23, 2021	D	
112th Seed	Nerd Games, Slider Games	EastAsiaSoft	August 6, 2020	D	
12 Is Better Than 6	Ink Stains Games	HypeTrain Digital	March 5, 2019	D	
12 Labours of Hercules	JetDogs, Zoom Out Games	JetDogs	March 24, 2019	D	
12 Labours of Hercules II: The Cretan Bull	JetDogs, Zoom Out Games	JetDogs	April 6, 2020	D	
12 Labours of Hercules III: Girl Power	JetDogs	JetDogs	January 15, 2021	D	
12 Labours of Hercules IV: Mother Nature	JetDogs, Zoom Out Games	JetDogs	August 31, 2021	D	
12 Labours of Hercules V: Kids of Hellas	JetDogs	JetDogs	March 2, 2022	D	
12 Labours of Hercules VI: Race for Olympus	JetDogs	JetDogs	January 2, 2023	D	
12 Labours of Hercules VII: Fleecing the Fleece	JetDogs	JetDogs	March 18, 2023	D	
12 Orbits	Roman Uhilg	Roman Uhilg	April 26, 2018	D	
123 Dots	Artax Games	Artax Games	August 5, 2021	D	
13 Sentinels: Aegis Rim	Vanillaware	Atlus	April 12, 2022		
140	Carlsen Games	Carlsen Games	January 9, 2020	D	
15in1 Solitaire	Inlogic Software	Silesia Games	February 24, 2022	D	
16-Bit Soccer	Sprakelsoft	Sprakelsoft	January 14, 2021	D	
1912: Titanic Mystery	Ocean Media	Ocean Media	February 25, 2021	D	
1917: The Alien Invasion DX	Andrade Games	Korion	June 14, 2018	D	
1971 Project Helios	Reco Technology	Reco Technology	June 9, 2020		
1979 Revolution: Black Friday	Ink Stories	Ink Stories	August 2, 2018	D	
198X	Hi-Bit Studios	JP: Hachinoyon; WW: Hi-Bit Studios	January 23, 2020	D	
1993 Shenandoah	Limit Break	Limit Break	July 9, 2020	D	
20 Minutes Till Dawn	Flanne	Indienova	December 21, 2023	D	
2045, Tsuki Yori	MELLOW	Entergram	December 23, 2023		
2048 Cat	Millo Games	Millo Games	December 23, 2019	D	
2064: Read Only Memories Integral	MidBoss	MidBoss	August 14, 2018		
20XX	Batterystaple Games	Batterystaple Games	July 10, 2018		
The 25th Ward: The Silver Case	Grasshopper Manufacture, Active Gaming Media	Playism	February 18, 2021		
2in1: Application Driver and Serial Killer / Sniper	Studio João Victor	Game Nacional	May 5, 2021	D	
2urvive	2Bad Games	2Bad Games	November 24, 2020	D	
2weistein: The Curse of the Red Dragon	Red Octopus	Red Octopus	September 14, 2020	D	
2weistein: The Curse of the Red Dragon 2	Red Octopus	Red Octopus	October 1, 2021	D	
3 Little Pigs & Bad Wolf	Making	Making	July 4, 2019	D	
3 out of 10: Season One	Terrible Posture Games	Terrible Posture Games	March 3, 2021	D	
32 Secs	isTom Games	isTom Games	May 27, 2021	D	
35MM	Sergey Noskov	Sometimes You	March 2, 2022	D	
36 Fragments of Midnight	Petite Games	JP: Rainy Frog; WW: Ratalaika Games	September 14, 2017	D	
39 Days to Mars	Its Anecdotal	Its Anecdotal	May 16, 2019	D	
3000th Duel	Neopopcorn	Neopopcorn	February 19, 2020	D	
3D Advantime	Game Nacional	Game Nacional	August 7, 2021	D	
3D Air Hockey	Benoit Varasse	Pix Arts	July 14, 2021	D	
3D Arcade Fishing	Independent Arts Software	Treva Entertainment	March 18, 2021	D	
3D MiniGolf	Joindots	Joindots	February 1, 2018	D	
4x4 Dirt Track	BoomBit Games	BoomBit Games	August 21, 2020	D	
5-fun Go Ni Igai no Ketsumatsu: Monochrome no Toshokan	Gakken	D3 Publisher	February 22, 2024		
6 Games in 1 Time Management Game Collection	GS2 Games	GS2 Games	October 26, 2021		
60 Parsecs!	Robot Gentleman	Robot Gentleman	December 20, 2019	D	
60 Seconds!	Robot Gentleman	Robot Gentleman	December 18, 2017	D	
60-in-1 Game Collection	Digital Bards	Digital Bards	November 10, 2023		
6180 the moon	Turtle Cream, PokPoong Games	Turtle Cream	May 24, 2018	D	
64.0	Rebel Rabbit	Indienova	October 31, 2019	D	
7 Billion Humans	Tomorrow Corporation	Tomorrow Corporation	October 25, 2018		
7 Years From Now	Fumi&Room6	PQube	June 17, 2021	D	
7'Scarlet	Idea Factory	Idea Factory	July 11, 2025		
7th Sector	Sergey Noskov	Sometimes You	February 5, 2020		
8-Ball Pocket	Super PowerUp Games	Super PowerUp Games	November 21, 2019	D	
8-Bit Farm	Kairosoft	Kairosoft	November 5, 2020	D	
80 Days	inkle	inkle	October 1, 2019		
80's Overdrive	Insane Code	JP: Rainy Frog; WW: Insane Code	May 7, 2020	D	
88 Heroes: 98 Heroes Edition	Bitmap Bureau	Rising Star Games	October 12, 2017		
9 Monkeys of Shaolin	Sobaka Studio	JP: Teyon; WW: Buka Entertainment	October 16, 2020		
9 -Nine-	Palette	Palette	June 23, 2022		
9 R.I.P.	Otomate	Idea Factory	October 15, 2024		
9 R.I.P. sequel	Otomate	Idea Factory	2026		
'90s Super GP	Pelikan13, Nicalis	Nicalis	TBA		
911 Operator	Jutsu Games	Sonka	October 26, 2018	D	
99Moves	EnjoyUp Games	JP: Starsign; WW: EnjoyUp Games	February 8, 2019	D	
99Seconds	EnjoyUp Games	JP: Starsign; WW: EnjoyUp Games	January 4, 2019	D	
99Vidas	QuByte Interactive	QuByte Interactive	November 27, 2018		
9th Dawn III: Shadow of Erthil	Valorware	Valorware	October 6, 2020		
