= Entertainment Technology Center =

Computer science facility at Carnegie Mellon University

Coordinates: 40.43184°N 79.96192°W

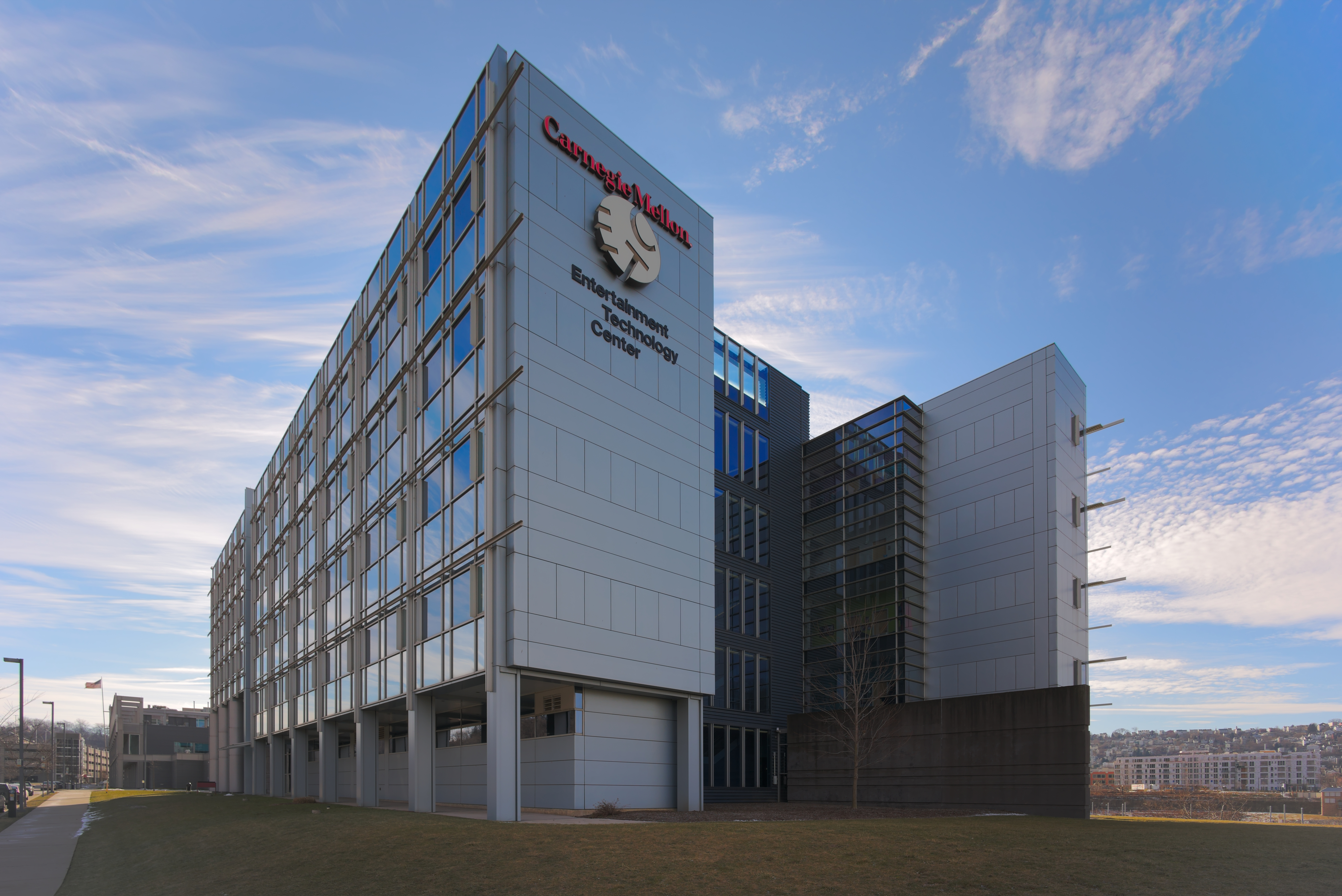
- Entertainment Technology Center in 2016
- Type: Private
- Established: 1999
- Director: Derek Ham
- Location: Pittsburgh, Pennsylvania
- Campus: Urban
- Website: www.etc.cmu.edu

The Entertainment Technology Center (ETC) is a department at Carnegie Mellon University in Pittsburgh, Pennsylvania, United States. The ETC offers a two-year terminal Masters of Entertainment Technology (MET) degree.

Students enrolled in the ETC learn interdisciplinary skills in design, art, and technology, and are prepared for industries where artists and technologists work hand-in-hand, such as video game development, theme park design, location-based entertainment, interactive storytelling, animation, visual effects, robotics, and technology.

== History ==
The Entertainment Technology Center (ETC) at Carnegie Mellon University was founded in 1999 by computer science professor Randy Pausch and drama professor Donald Marinelli as a joint initiative between the School of Computer Science and the College of Fine Arts. Conceived as an interdisciplinary graduate program, the ETC was created to bridge the gap between technology and the arts by preparing students to work collaboratively in emerging entertainment industries, including video games, themed entertainment, animation, and interactive media.

The program grew out of Carnegie Mellon’s longstanding emphasis on interdisciplinary research and experimentation. Pausch brought experience in virtual reality and human-computer interaction, including work with Walt Disney Imagineering, while Marinelli contributed expertise in theater, arts management, and digital storytelling. Together, they designed a project-based curriculum centered on team collaboration, rapid prototyping, and experiential learning.

The ETC is the first and only to offer a Master of Entertainment Technology (MET) degree, emphasizing production-oriented work over traditional academic research. Early courses such as Building Virtual Worlds became widely recognized for immersing students from artistic and technical backgrounds in emerging technologies like virtual reality (VR) and requiring them to collaborate on rapid prototypes.

The ETC gained international visibility through Pausch’s viral 2007 talk The Last Lecture, which highlighted the center’s philosophy of creativity, teamwork, and applied learning in the context of Pausch’s life. Following Pausch’s death in 2008, the ETC honored Pausch’s legacy by naming the building’s largest space — the Randy Pausch Interdisciplinary Studio — in his honor.

The ETC developed strong relationships with industry partners in gaming, location-based entertainment, tech, and film. One example of this is the program’s annual West Coast Trip, where first-year students visit companies in Los Angeles and San Francisco including Electronic Arts, Industrial Light & Magic, Naughty Dog, Riot Games, Sony Pictures Entertainment, and Blizzard Entertainment.

In 2007, the ETC opened a Silicon Valley campus embedded within Electronic Arts’s offices in the Bay Area. Run by ETC faculty members Carl Rosendahl and Jiyoung Lee, students could choose to spend a semester at the Silicon Valley campus working on projects with the faculty there and with EA often serving as a client. The campus closed in 2020 during COVID.

From 2004 to 2016, Star Wars actor Anthony Daniels held a visiting professor position at the ETC. In that role, he gave lectures on the history of robotics, consulted on character intelligibility, and advised student projects. In 2015, actor Michael Keaton was a visiting scholar at the ETC.

The ETC continues to maintain and develop Alice, the free and open-source educational programming software created by Randy Pausch, through the Alice Project initiative. In 2025, the platform celebrated its 30th anniversary.

== Curriculum ==
All students at the ETC follow the same four-semester curriculum, which has remained unchanged since the program’s inception.

All first-year students take the same four courses in their first semester, sometimes called the Immersion Semester. This sequence of four foundational courses — Building Virtual Worlds, Improvisational Acting, Visual Story, and ETC Fundamentals — teaches them how to collaborate, problem-solve, communicate and lead. For each of the three remaining semesters, students will spend the 14-week period working together on a real product or prototype in what’s called a project course. Some of these projects are on behalf of clients, while others center on a student or faculty pitch idea.

Students also have the opportunity after their first semester to choose elective courses aligned with their specific areas of interest — whether that’s a course within the ETC or offered by another Carnegie Mellon University school.

== Notable Faculty ==
- Chris Klug — award-winning game designer, creator of James Bond 007
- Carl Rosendahl — founder of Pacific Data Images
- Jesse Schell – founder and CEO of Schell Games, author of The Art of Game Design
- Jessica Hammer — associate professor in Carnegie Mellon University’s Human-Computer Interaction Institute, director of the Center for Transformational Play
- Heather Kelley — award-winning indie game designer, co-founder of Kokoromi

== Notable alumni ==
- Neil Druckmann — creator of The Last of Us, co-studio head of Naughty Dog
- Chris Bell — game designer of What Remains of Edith Finch
- Asi Burak — Peacemaker designer, former chairman of Games for Change, author of Power Play: How Video Games Can Save the World
- Cort Stratton – Playstation and Unity developer behind official rendering API for Playstation 4
- Allan Blomquist, Kyle Gabler, and Kyle Gray — founders of Tomorrow Corporation; Gabler co-developed World of Goo and later all three worked on World of Goo 2
- Kevin Primm — Super Nintendo World production designer
- Liangzheng Luo, Josh Li, and Ziheng Xiao — game designers on Black Myth: Wukong
- Albert Shih — game designer of Superliminal
- Arnab Basu — game designer on Tomb Raider
- JeongHyun “Junction” Bae and Soo Jeong Bae — founders of Korean game studio Loadcomplete

== Notable projects ==
- Panda3D
- Peacemaker
- Skyrates
- World of Goo
- Superliminal
- GameSalad
- Quasi
