= Power Play =

Power play is a sporting term used in various games.

Power play or powerplay may also refer to:

== Sports ==
- Powerplay (cricket), a rule concerning fielding restrictions in one-day international cricket
- Power play (curling), a rule concerning the placing of stones in doubles curling
- PowerPlay Golf, a variation of nine-hole golf, featuring two flags on a green

== Literature ==
=== Fiction ===
- Power Play, a 1977 novel by James Herbert Brennan
- Power Play, a 1979 novel by Warren Murphy and Richard Sapir; the thirty-sixth installment in The Destroyer novel series
- Power Plays, a 1979 novel by Collin Wilcox
- Power Play, a 1982 novel by Jayne Castle
- Power Play, a 1983 novel by Francine Pascal; the fourth installment in the Sweet Valley High series
- Power Play, a 1988 novel by Penny Jordan
- Power Play, a 1991 Hardy Boys novel by Rick Oliver writing as Franklin W. Dixon; the 50th installment in the Hardy Boys Casefiles series
- Power Play, a 1995 Petaybee series novel by Anne McCaffrey and Elizabeth Ann Scarborough
- Tom Clancy's Power Plays, a 1997–2004 novel series created by Tom Clancy
- Mighty Ducks: Power Play, a 1997 chapter book by Nancy E. Krulik; part of the Disney Chapters book series and based on the television series Mighty Ducks: The Animated Series
- Power Play, a 1998 novel by Alan Gibbons

=== Non-fiction ===
- Power Play: How Video Games Can Save the World, a 2017 book by Asi Burak and Laura Parker
- Power Play: Tesla, Elon Musk, and the Bet of the Century, a 2021 book by Tim Higgins

== Film and TV ==
=== Film ===
- Power Play (1978 film), a 1978 British-Canadian political thriller film
- Power Play (2003 film), a 2003 American action film
- Power Play (2021 film), a 2021 Indian crime thriller film

=== Television ===
- Power Play (1998 TV series), a 1998–2000 Canadian series about a hockey team in Hamilton, Ontario
- Power Play (2009 TV program), a 2009 Canadian political affairs program
- Power Play, an American program from Night Tracks that aired on TBS from 1985 to 1988 and from 1988 to 1989 as Power Play Dancin'

==== Episodes ====
- "Power Play" (Angel), 2004
- "Power Play" (Cheers), 1983
- "Power Play" (Hit the Floor), 2016
- "Power Play" (Knots Landing), 1982
- "Power Play" (Pretty Little Liars), 2017
- "Power Play" (Star Trek: The Next Generation), 1992
- "Power Play" (Static Shock), 2002
- "Power Play" (White Collar), 2011

== Music ==
- Power Play (quartet), an American barbershop quartet
- Powerplay (band)
- Power Play (April Wine album), 1982
- Power Play (Dragon album), 1979

== Video games ==
- PC PowerPlay, a PC games magazine published in Australia
- Power Play (magazine), a defunct German computer and video game magazine published by Markt+Technik
- PowerPlay (technology), a defunct standard for networked video gaming headed by Valve and Cisco Systems
- Logitech PowerPlay, a mousepad released in 2017
- Powerplay Cruiser, a joystick released in the early 1990s
- Commodore Power/Play, a defunct video game magazine
- Powerplay: The Game of the Gods, an ZX Spectrum games

== Other uses ==
- Powerplay (theory), international politics theory, raised by Victor D.Cha
- AMD PowerPlay, a power management technology from ATI Technologies/AMD
- Power Play (audio drama), an audio drama based on the Doctor Who television series
- PowerPlay (lottery)

== See also ==
- Power (play), multiple stage works
