= PeaceMaker =

2007 video game

- Developer: ImpactGames
- Designers: Tim Sweeney, Eric Brown, Asi Burak
- Platforms: Mac OS X, Windows, Android
- Release: February 1, 2007
- Genres: Government simulation, turn-based strategy
- Mode: Single player

PeaceMaker is a video game developed by ImpactGames, and published in February 2007 for Windows, Mac OS and Android. It is a government simulation game which simulates the Israeli–Palestinian conflict. Labelled as a serious game, it is often pitched as "a video game to promote peace".

The game was originally a university project started in 2005 by a small team from the Entertainment Technology Center at Carnegie Mellon University. After graduating, two of the members founded a game development company in order to finish the project.

Peacemaker players can choose to represent either the Prime Minister of Israel or the President of the Palestinian Authority. They have to deal with events presented using real world pictures and footage. They have to react and make social, political, and military decisions that their position entails within a gameplay system similar to turn-based strategy. The goal of the game is to resolve the conflict with a two-state solution.

PeaceMaker was well received by both the gaming and general press and won several awards. Critics praised its gameplay and the accuracy of the conflict representation. It is seen as an important game for the serious game movement and is becoming a flagship of the genre. Its educational value allows for a better understanding of the conflict and promotes peace.

== Gameplay ==
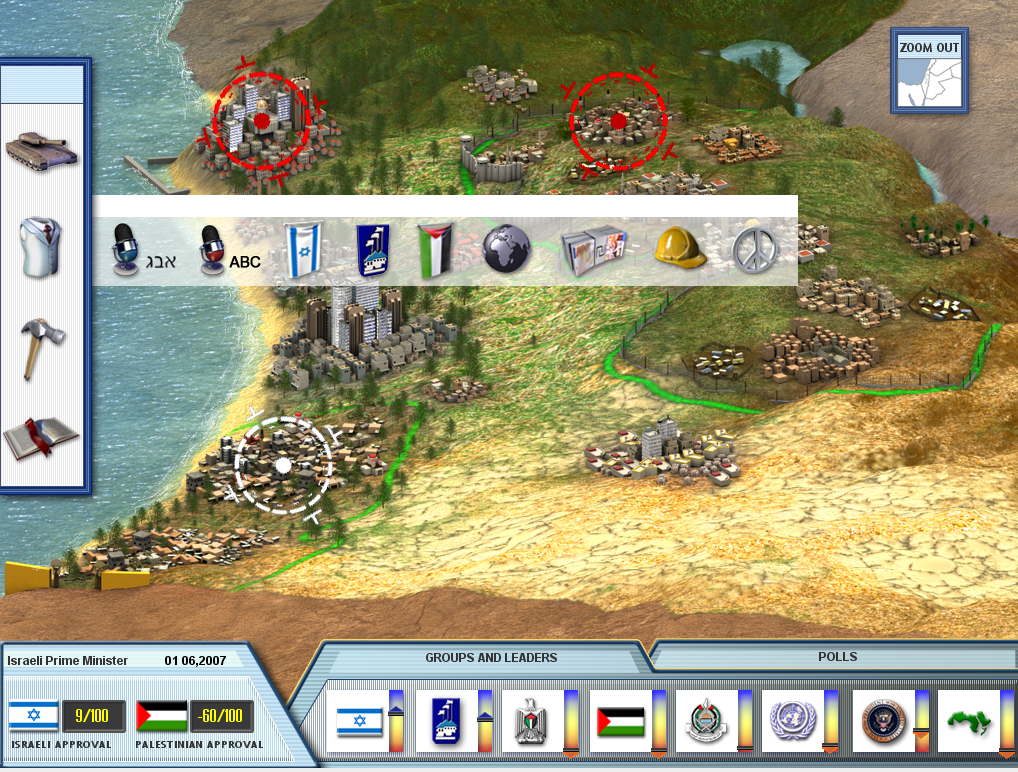
The game interface includes a map of the region, reminiscent of the turn-based strategy conventions.

PeaceMaker is a government simulation game that incorporates elements of turn-based strategy. The player choose to be either the Prime Minister of Israel or the President of the Palestinian National Authority, and must resolve the conflict peacefully. The game interface includes a map, like Civilization, showing the Gaza Strip, the Galilee, the West Bank and the north of the Negev. After each turn, the events of the week are pointed on the map. By clicking on it, the player views a news report, with real-world pictures and footage, of a demonstration or a bomb attack.

Each week, the player makes a decision regarding security, construction or politics. The player may seek the advice of two advisers with differing opposite views. The Palestinian President is helped by a national and a foreign adviser. The Israeli Prime Minister has the views of a hawk, advocating repressive measures, and a dove, willing to help the Palestinians. The player has access to panel of decision, such as making a speech, negotiating with other leaders or staging military operations. Reflecting the asymmetric conflict, the two leaders cannot make the same decisions. The Israeli Prime Minister has major financial and military power, and can for example order missile strikes or a curfew. The Palestinian President is much more helpless, and has to ask the third-party help for most of his actions.

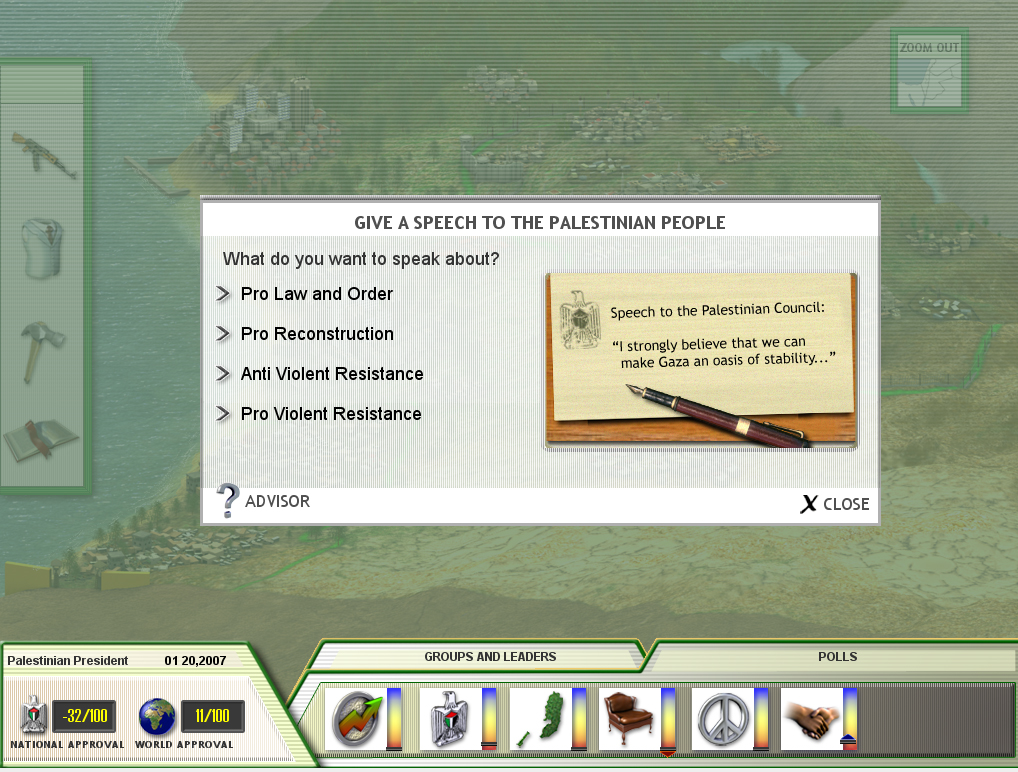
The player performs one actions at each turn, such as giving his people a political speech.

A key-point of the game is that the actions of the players do not always have the expected outcome. For example, an Israeli proposal for medical aid shortly after an air strike will be turned down, and will deteriorate even further the relation with the Palestinians. The player actions provoke immediate reactions, such as public protest or political critics. They also influence several long-term variables, classified into two categories. The first is the approval of the policy of the player by different groups and leaders. The second covers economical, social or political indicators. Their values are displayed on the screen as thermometers.

Each leader must take into account the approval of his counterpart, of both people, of the United Nations, the United States and the Arab world. The Palestinian President also has to deal with the Fatah and Hamas; and the Israeli Prime Minister with the Yesha Council (representing the settlers) and all the Palestinian militant organisations (such as the Islamic Jihad, the Izz ad-Din al-Qassam Brigades and the Al-Aqsa Martyrs' Brigades). The player has access to polls, which represent the different indicators. Each leader is informed of his leadership and the quality of his relations with the other party. On the Palestinian side, the polls cover the authority of the President, the opinion of the man of the street towards Israel, economic health and national independence. On the Israeli side, they reflect the insecurity, the suppression, and the Israeli compassion towards the Palestinians.

The opinions of the different parties are summarised by two counters displayed on the screen. Ranging from −100 to 100, they measure the approval of two groups. In the role of the Prime Minister of Israel, those two groups are the Israeli and Palestinian people; in the role of Palestinian President, of its citizens and the international community. The game starts with both counters at zero. Any of them dropping too low cause the game over: either the leader is removed from office, or the new intifada begins. When both counters are up to the maximum, the conflict is solved by the two-state solution.

== Development ==
PeaceMaker started as a university project in 2005. It was carried out by a small team of master's students at Carnegie Mellon's Entertainment Technology Center in Pittsburgh, a department shared between the College of Fine Arts and the School of Computer Science. American Eric Brown and former Israeli officer Asi Burak were the producers of the game. Tim Sweeney was the lead game designer, working with Olive Lin, writer Victoria Webb and composer Ross Popoff. Eric Keylor and Lin were the programmers. The team was supervised by two professors of the university.

The goal of this group was to create a meaningful interactive experience about one of the most serious political conflicts in the world. Our mission was to prove that such an experience could reach new audiences and convey the message of understanding in a fresh way.

— Asi Burak

To prototype the game design, the team used board games. They helped to "model the stakeholders in the conflict". They were then converted into a dice game which could be coded. The logic engine and the artificial intelligence were developed in Java. The graphical user interface used Adobe Flash and QuickTime. The different graphic elements were made by Patrick Bannan. He used the software 3ds Max, Adobe Photoshop and Adobe Illustrator, starting with 3D modeling, texture mapping and lighting.

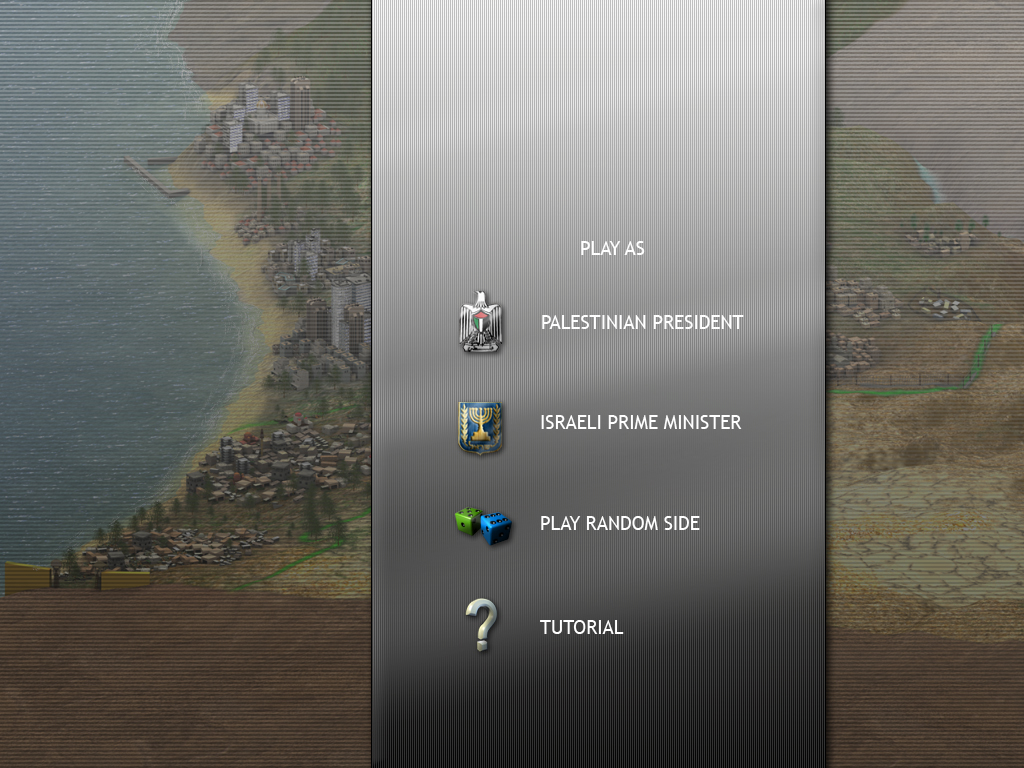
Having the choice of the leader, between the Prime Minister of Israel and the President of the Palestinian National Authority, is a central part of the educative side of the game.

A prototype of the game was presented at the Game Developers Conference in 2005. Given the excellent reception, Brown and Burak decide to complete the project, in order to distribute it to the general public and educators. After graduating, they founded the studio ImpactGames and planned to produce other games of the same kind. Their objective is to "impact society and promote change through interactive media". They also want to change the industry, by "making something that compares to the role documentaries play in the movie industry". In order to make an unbiased game, they wanted the contribution of Palestinians; two joined the team.

Initially, the developers did not want to "define the end-solution", in order to avoid controversy. Victory was then defined by the lowering of violence. Early players' reactions showed the necessity for "a more meaningful outcome". With the input of experts from both sides and the United States, they chose the two-state solution. It was mainly because of the support of the United Nations Security Council resolution, the roadmap for peace and the Arab peace initiative.

This choice was one of the design assumptions made by the developers. Game designer Tim Sweeney, although he admitted they are debatable, claimed his right to define the scope of the work. He considered that they do not favour any side, but rather peace. The developers assumed that both sides wanted peace and that the player can make a difference, but does not have total control of their side, and that peace could be achieved through small, concrete actions.

The first stable version of PeaceMaker was released on 1 February 2005, downloadable from the company website. A box version was published on Amazon.com four months later. The game is playable in English, Hebrew and Arabic, to "strengthen the multiple point-of-views". The game was sold for twenty dollars. ImpactGames was criticised for this, from people considering that such a game should be free of charge. This had been a major debate at the beginning of the development. Eric Brown explained that being for-profit allowed to find investors more easily. Moreover, they wanted to make an example of commercially viable game within the industry. On 4 November 2013, Brown updated the ImpactGames blog to announce that PeaceMaker was now free to download and play, hoping this would "allow the game to find an even larger audience in schools, community centers, and the general public.".

== Reception ==
Reception

Aggregate score
Aggregator	Score
Metacritic	75 % (with five reviews)

Review scores
Publication	Score
Eurogamer	7 / 10
PC Gamer (UK)	82 %

PeaceMaker received positive reviews from both the gaming and general press. In an article published in Gamasutra, Ernest W. Adams stated that the game is "fun and challenging", and holds a deep level of subtlety. He compares it to Balance of Power, a simulation of geopolitics during the Cold War, published by Chris Crawford in 1985. Adams claimed that while Balance of Power can be summarised as a zero-sum game, PeaceMaker is "a richer and more difficult challenge".

Eurogamer's Oliver Clare noted a few minor game design flaws, which he attributed to "Impact Games' inexperience with interface design". According to him, "the narrow theme" limits the replay value and appeal of the game. He stressed that the game shows no bias, and holds an "amazingly positive educational potential". Clare claimed he suffered viewing all the tragedies in the game, and that the first time he won the game, tears came to his eyes : "For a few poignant moments you get an inkling of what peaceful co-existence in the Middle East might actually feel like, what it might mean". Judy Siegel-Itzkovich from The Jerusalem Post had a similar opinion, stating that the game is "immersive" and that "learning the background of this endless dispute could be very educational". Her colleague Calev Ben-David was impressed by the graphics and texts. He also appreciated the winning condition: according to him, setting a time limit would have been unrealistic.

Critics agreed that the game model is relevant. Alexander Gambotto-Burke from The Guardian described it as "an astonishingly sophisticated simulation of the Israel/Palestine conflict". In a column published in July 2009, Steven Poole claimed that the game "provides a roughly accurate model of the political and security options on both sides of an actual conflict", and that it was rightly praised. Poole pointed out the game's most educational side is that the intentions of the player do not always lead to the expected outcome. According to him, PeaceMaker makes the player understand that "even people who do have power cannot control everything, and they, too, can be at the mercy of events". The Globe and Mail's Marc MacKinnon agreed, stating that "it gives players a feel for the impossibility of Mahmoud Abbas and Ehud Olmert's jobs".

In July 2007, PeaceMaker was the most sold second PC game of the week in North America on Amazon.com. The website mentioned a "suddenly high level of demand", that Asi Burak attributed to an interview at the National Public Radio the same month. As of February 2008, the game had sold 100,000 copies worldwide.

== Impact ==
The rise of Internet allows alternative distribution channels, such as downloading freeware or through platforms such as Steam, and later Xbox Live Arcade, PlayStation Network or WiiWare. New mainstream developments tools, like Flash, allow a democratization of game production. These elements have given rise to new dynamics in the industry, such as fangame, independent game and serious game. This last category refers to games tackling serious issues like war, global warming or gerrymandering. In the 2000s, these games receive more coverage by both gaming and general press. They have however a bad reputation because of widely criticised gameplay and game design flaws.

PeaceMaker has become a flagship of the serious game, and a major step for the acknowledgement of the genre. In 2006, it took the award in a competition organized by the University of Southern California, entitled "Reinventing public diplomacy through games". It won the " Best Transformation Game" award in 2007. This prize rewards "the best game which engages players on a deep and meaningful level around an important social issue, whose aims and outcomes are no less than to foster a powerful intellectual or behavioural transformation in it users". It is awarded by the association Games for Change, whose mission is to promote "games that engage contemporary social issues in meaningful ways to foster a more just, equitable and tolerant society". Suzanne Seggerman, co-founder of the association, stated in 2009 that just like Darfur is Dying, Food Force and Ayiti: The Cost of Life, PeaceMaker was just such a game, "having had an impact".

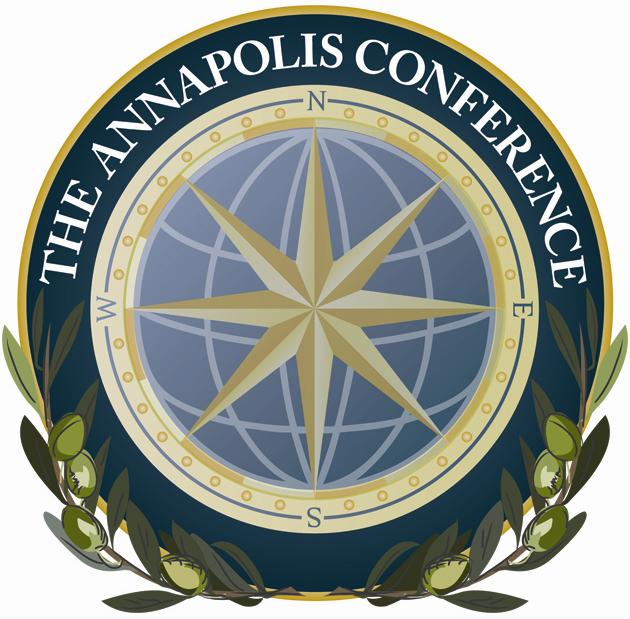
For the Annapolis conference, the Peres Center for Peace funded a large-scale distribution of the game in Israel and Palestine.

PeaceMaker is described by its creators as "a video game to teach peace", and is primarily intended for Israeli and Palestinian students. In November 2007, the Peres Center for Peace funded the distribution of 100,000 copies in Israel and Palestine. 75,000 copies are sent to the subscribers of the Israeli daily Haaretz, 10,000 to subscribers to the Palestinian daily Al-Quds. The remaining 15,000 are distributed in high-schools of both sides. This action is made in conjunction with the Annapolis conference, during which all parties agree on the two-state solution. Shortly after the Centre set up the "PeaceMaker Educational Program". It consists in using the game in Israeli and Palestinian schools, and to lead a supervised debate with the students. Over fifty workshops were held in 2008, involving 1,600 students from two states. This total amounts to 3,000 students in September 2009.

Can PeaceMaker achieve peace? No. That depends on the hearts and minds of the people who live in the Middle East – both in the affected areas and the neighboring countries too. Can it promote peace, which it states as its goal? Definitely, if it reaches a wide enough audience. Impact Games wants PeaceMaker to be more than merely a classroom tool; they hope it will be a genuinely popular game and a springboard for discussion among many people.

— Ernest W. Adams, The Designer's Notebook: Asymmetric Peacefare

== Legacy ==
In February 2008 ImpactGames launched the program Play the News. It is a web-based platform used to publish mini-games based on the news. The idea is that interactivity allows a better understanding of an event, rather than passive reading. A game is designed to be played for ten to twenty minutes, and to be developed in a day.

The game is divided into three steps. The player firstly has access to information about the event and its context, using timelines and maps. Then, they can play successively as the different protagonists of the event. They are asked to make a decision, following what they think the stakeholder should do. Finally, the player predicts which decision the protagonist will make. When the player returns later, he is informed of the decisions that were made in the real world. Play the News is built around a community, where every player has a profile. He may read statistics on the accuracy of his predictions and the tendency of his opinions (mainstream or fringe within the community).

Shortly after the launch, Ian Bogost described Play the News as "very casual", and feared that it could be summarised as a simple quiz. He claimed that the game had some potential to engage people with the news, "by making them think about what will happen next and by creating a natural reason to read stories one otherwise might not". The game won in May 2009 the first "Knight News Game Awards", awarded by the association Games for Change. It rewards "news game", games that "[enhance] people's ability to make decisions in a democracy".
