= Little Inferno =

2012 video game

- Developer: Tomorrow Corporation
- Publishers: Tomorrow Corporation; Experimental Gameplay Group (iOS)
- Producer: Kyle Gabler
- Designers: Kyle Gabler; Kyle Gray
- Programmer: Allan Blomquist
- Artists: Kyle Gabler; Kyle Gray
- Writer: Kyle Gabler
- Composer: Kyle Gabler
- Platforms: Wii U; Microsoft Windows; iOS; OS X; Linux; Android; Nintendo Switch
- Release: Wii U: NA: November 18, 2012; PAL: November 30, 2012; Windows; November 19, 2012 iOS: NA: January 31, 2013; EU: March 28, 2013; OS X April 10, 2013; Linux; June 5, 2013; Android; December 3, 2013; Switch: NA: March 16, 2017; PAL: March 23, 2017
- Genre: Puzzle
- Mode: Single-player

Little Inferno is a puzzle video game developed and published by American independent game developer Tomorrow Corporation. The game was released for the Wii U in November 2012 in North America, Europe and Australasia. Microsoft Windows, iOS, OS X, Linux and Android versions followed throughout 2013. A Nintendo Switch version was released in March 2017 in North America, Europe and Australia.

Little Inferno is set in front of a brick fireplace, which the player uses to set various objects, such as toys, dolls, and electronics, on fire. The game encourages the player to burn any combination of objects to see how they react when lit ablaze, as most of the objects have unique properties. Little Inferno is classified as a sandbox game as it offers few traditional objectives to complete and has no states of failure. The game was designed as a satire of similarly themed video games in which the player dedicates long amounts of time to performing tasks considered to be unrewarding.

Little Inferno garnered widely varied reactions upon its release. Some reviewers praised the unique gameplay concepts and satirical narrative, while others believed the gameplay was too simplistic.

== Gameplay ==
Little Inferno focuses on setting fire to objects placed in the on-screen fireplace. Money that emerges from the ashes is used to purchase more objects to burn.

Little Inferno is a sandbox-oriented puzzle video game primarily viewed from a first-person perspective. The player assumes the role of a small, largely unseen character who possesses the fictional "Little Inferno Entertainment Fireplace", which they use to incinerate various objects, such as toys and appliances, to keep warm (necessary due to a seemingly unending drop in the game world's temperature). The objects release money when they are burned, which is used to purchase more burnable objects from mail order catalogs. In order to progress the narrative, the player must burn the newest objects available to them, unlocking new catalogs and expanding the selection of (more expensive) objects. There is no scoring system, nor are there any penalties or time limits imposed on the player, allowing them to freely experiment with burning any combination of objects. The game uses a drag and drop interface to position and ignite the objects. The PC versions are controlled using a mouse, while the Wii U version can be controlled with the Wii Remote pointer or with the Wii U GamePad's touchscreen, which also allows for Off-TV Play.

Many of the game's available objects possess special properties that may influence the other objects in the fireplace. For example, frozen objects such as dry ice cause others to freeze and easily shatter, and objects with strong gravitational pull move or attract all other objects. When set on fire, many objects react by activating, exploding, or changing the properties of the flames. All objects automatically vanish from the fireplace upon being reduced to ash.

Little Inferno offers the player several goals to achieve. The player can trigger "Combos" when two or three specific objects are burned simultaneously. The player is presented with a list of the game's 99 possible Combos; the names of the Combos hint the relationship of the required objects, and it is up to the player to determine the correct objects to burn. By burning new Combos, the player can earn stamps which speed up shipping new objects, along with a small amount of bonus money.

== Story ==
In Little Inferno, the story is told through letters from various characters, primarily the player's eccentric neighbor, Sugar Plumps. Set in the snowy city of Burnington, where the Tomorrow Corporation produces the "Little Inferno Entertainment Fireplace" to keep residents warm, the game focuses on the player burning items in their fireplace to stay entertained. Sugar Plumps, who becomes progressively more disturbed as the game goes on, requests items for burning and eventually reveals that she intentionally set her house on fire. Her disappearance leads to mysterious letters from an apparition resembling her, prompting the player to burn certain items, ultimately causing their house to explode and escape into a new phase of gameplay.

The second part of the game transitions to a side-scrolling adventure, where the player explores Burnington and meets characters like the postman and the CEO of Tomorrow Corporation, Miss Nancy. Nancy confesses her plan to escape the doomed city in a rocket, and the player is given a choice to join her. The game ends with the player and the Weather Man, who has been reporting the city's bleak weather throughout the game, soaring through the sky as the sun breaks through the endless snow.

== Development ==
Little Inferno is the debut game by Tomorrow Corporation, an independent game developer studio founded in 2010 by Kyle Gray, Kyle Gabler, and Allan Blomquist. Gabler and Blomquist previously worked on World of Goo, while Gray worked on Henry Hatsworth in the Puzzling Adventure. Inspired by the "Yule Log" TV program, the team aimed to create a game that started with an underwhelming premise but turned out to be surprisingly engaging. The goal was to make the game unpredictable and immersive, allowing players to discover the gameplay without knowing where it would lead. Announced in August 2010, Little Inferno was released as a launch title for the Wii U in November 2012, with versions for other platforms following shortly after. The game was localized into several languages, including Japanese, with Nintendo's help. It also saw a release for the Nintendo Switch in 2017. After five years without updates, Tomorrow Corporation released the Ho Ho Holiday Expansion in 2022, adding a Christmas-themed update to the game.

=== Music ===
Kyle Gabler composed the soundtrack for Little Inferno. Unlike World of Goo, whose musical themes were recycled from previous projects, Gabler wrote Little Inferno's score from scratch, using the works of John Williams, Danny Elfman, and Vangelis for inspiration, which have "strong melodic themes and instantly identifiable orchestration." Gabler used REAPER to compose all the game's music, with some synthesized instruments used from a personal collection of SoundFont2 files.

Knowing that Little Inferno is a "difficult game to describe", one of the songs, "Little Inferno, Just For Me," was written to describe the game's premise in the form of a jingle. The jingle is used in-game in a fictional advertisement for the Little Inferno Entertainment Fireplace, which itself is featured in promotional trailers for the title. Travis Hill, illustrator and friend of Kyle Gray, voiced the narrator featured in the song. Shortly after the game's release, Gabler released the soundtrack for free on Tomorrow Corporation's website.

Little Inferno Original Soundtrack
No.	Title	Length
1.	"Little Inferno Titles"	1:18
2.	"Miss Nancy Welcomes You"	1:04
3.	"Your New Friend Sugar Plumps"	0:32
4.	"Reporting From the Weather Balloon"	2:39
5.	"Just Like You"	0:37
6.	"8 Bit Inferno"	0:09
7.	"Something to Tell You"	1:26
8.	"Inferno Beta"	0:16
9.	"Cardboard Sword"	0:06
10.	"Up Up Up the Chimney"	1:08
11.	"Incident on the Other Side of the Wall"	0:48
12.	"Transhumanist Connects"	0:19
13.	"Ooo It's so Bright"	0:56
14.	"The City"	3:03
15.	"Gate Operator, Open the Gates!"	1:07
16.	"Productivity Tengo"	0:56
17.	"Miss Nancy Remembers"	1:10
18.	"The City Limits"	1:34
19.	"Breaking Weather Report"	1:01
20.	"Over the Smokestacks, Over the City"	1:17
21.	"Little Inferno, Just For Me"	1:26
22.	"Tomorrow Corporation, the Future is Tomorrow!"	0:04

== Reception ==
Reception

Aggregate score
Aggregator	Score
Metacritic	(iOS) 82/100 (Wii U) 79/100 (Switch) 71/100 (PC) 68/100

Review scores
Publication	Score
Destructoid	(Wii U) 9/10 (Switch) 7/10
Eurogamer	(PC) 8/10
Game Informer	(Wii U) 8.5/10
GameSpot	(Wii U) 7/10
IGN	(Wii U) 6.5/10 (PC) 5/10
Joystiq	(Wii U) 4/5
MacLife	(iOS) 3.5/5
Nintendo Life	(Wii U) 8/10 (Switch) 7/10
Nintendo World Report	(Wii U) 9/10 (Switch) 8.5/10
Official Nintendo Magazine	(Wii U) 66%
PC Gamer (UK)	(PC) 45%
Pocket Gamer	(iOS) 3.5/5
The Telegraph	(PC) 4/5
TouchArcade	(iOS) 5/5

The Wii U and iOS versions received "favorable" reviews, while the PC and Switch versions received "average" reviews, according to the review aggregation website Metacritic.

Critics lauded the game's ability to stick with players long after playing. Kotaku's Stephen Totilo admired its simplicity, describing the game as both "quaint and bold" with an enduring, impactful presence. Similarly, Tyler Ohlew from Nintendo World Report praised the Wii U version for its originality and open-ended nature, noting that it encouraged players to use their imagination and creativity. He emphasized that its lack of a traditional structure did not detract from its enjoyment. GameZone gave the Wii U version a high rating, highlighting its memorable and impressive experience.

However, some reviews criticized the game for its perceived high price relative to the gameplay. Reviewers pointed out that certain aspects, like the repetitive nature of the mechanics and the delays between purchasing and receiving items, could feel tedious. Despite these concerns, some saw these elements as deliberate commentary on gaming culture. For example, Joystiq's Garrett Martin suggested that the game's intentional pacing and minimalistic design were part of a satirical reflection on how players engage with games. Edge also acknowledged this satire but questioned whether the game's humor fully landed.

Criticism was more pointed in the case of the PC version. IGN's Anthony Gallegos found the story too vague and the puzzles uninspired. He also felt that the game's mechanics, such as the need to spend in-game money to buy new items, were frustrating and unnecessary. In his view, the game's few strong ideas were overshadowed by these limitations. Lucas M. Thomas, also from IGN, felt that players who enjoyed World of Goo might find Little Inferno disappointing. Official Nintendo Magazine regarded the Wii U version as the fourth-best exclusive of 2012 on the Nintendo eShop.

Little Inferno won the award for Technical Excellence, whereas it was nominated for the Seumas McNally Grand Prize and the Nuovo Award and received two Honorable Mentions at the Independent Games Festival.
