= Tomorrow Corporation =

Independent video game developer

- Type: General partnership
- Industry: Video games
- Founded: 2010; 16 years ago
- Founders: Allan Blomquist; Kyle Gabler; Kyle Gray
- Headquarters: Orlando, Florida, United States
- Products: Little Inferno, Human Resource Machine, 7 Billion Humans
- Services: Video game development
- Owner: Experimental Gameplay Group
- Number of employees: 3
- Parent: Experimental Gameplay Group
- Website: tomorrowcorporation.com

Tomorrow Corporation is an independent video game studio consisting of Kyle Gabler, Allan Blomquist, and Kyle Gray. It is a division of the Experimental Gameplay Group.

The company supports the Experimental Gameplay Project, which encourages non-standard game development strategies. The Project, originally started by Gabler and Gray while at Carnegie Mellon University in 2005 aims less to be a competitor, and more a source of inspiration, for other game developers, recognizing that game conception is generally one of the more difficult aspects of development.

The goal of the project was to encourage individual developers to create a functional game prototype within seven days based on a given abstract theme, such as "gravity" or "flowers". Developers are then free to continue to expand on the development if they choose; for example, World of Goo is based on Tower of Goo, which was one of the original entries for the Project.

== History ==
Gabler, Blomquist, and Gray met as grad students at the Entertainment Technology Center of Carnegie Mellon University and went on to join separate divisions of Electronic Arts. Gabler and Blomquist became restless at EA and opted to develop independently, with Gabler forming 2D Boy and helping to create World of Goo, a game which expanded upon a prototype that Gabler had started in 2005 at Carnegie Mellon. Blomquist would go on to work on the Wii port of World of Goo, while Gray worked as the lead designer for Henry Hatsworth in the Puzzling Adventure.

In 2010, once those projects were completed, the trio met again and decided to form Tomorrow Corporation. They produced their first title, Little Inferno in 2012. Their next game, Human Resource Machine, was released in October 2015, and its sequel, 7 Billion Humans in August 2018. In March 2018, they announced their next game would be titled Welcome to the Information Superhighway. In December 2021, they published The Captain, developed by Sysiac Games. In August 2024, Tomorrow Corporation released World of Goo 2 alongside original World of Goo studio, 2D Boy.

== Games ==
Year	Title	Platform(s)	Notes
2008	World of Goo	Windows, Android, Nintendo Switch, Wii, iOS, Linux, MacOS	Published, developed by 2D Boy
2012	Little Inferno	Wii U, Windows, iOS, macOS, Linux, Android, Nintendo Switch	
2015	Human Resource Machine	Wii U, Windows, iOS, macOS, Linux, Android, Nintendo Switch	
2018	7 Billion Humans	Windows, Linux, iOS, macOS, Nintendo Switch, Android	
2021	The Captain	Windows, Linux, Nintendo Switch, macOS	Published, developed by Sysiac Games
2024	World of Goo 2	Windows, macOS, Linux, Nintendo Switch, Android, iOS, PlayStation 5	Co-developed with 2D Boy
