= 911 Operator (video game) =

2017 video game

- Developer: Jutsu Games
- Publishers: PlayWay; Code Horizon (Xbox); SONKA (Switch)
- Programmers: Bartek Gajewski; Radek Rowicki; Bartosz Bruski
- Artist: Anna Szulc
- Composer: Grzegorz Michalak
- Platforms: Windows; PlayStation 4; Xbox One; Android; Switch; Mac; iOS
- Release: February 24, 2017
- Genre: Simulation
- Mode: Single-player

911 Operator (Polish: Operator Numeru Alarmowego) is a simulation video game developed by Polish studio Jutsu Games and published in 2017 by PlayWay. The player assumes the role of a 9-1-1 telephone operator who must answer phone calls and dispatch police officers, paramedics, and firefighters to various emergencies. 911 Operator was funded through a successful Kickstarter campaign that ran from July 21 to August 20, 2016. The game was released on PC in February 2017, with releases for the PlayStation 4 and Xbox One following later that year. The Android version of the game was released on November 16, 2017. On October 26, 2018, the game was released for Nintendo Switch.

A sequel, 112 Operator, was released on April 23, 2020 on PC via Steam, and on October 22, 2020 on Google Play for Android mobile. It was released on PlayStation 4, PlayStation 5, Xbox One, and Xbox Series X/S on August 30th, 2024.

== Development ==
911 Operator was funded via a Kickstarter campaign which launched on July 21, 2016 with a goal of 9,110 Canadian dollars. The campaign ended successfully on August 20, 2016 with a total of $37,924 raised.

== Reception ==
Reception

Aggregate scores
| Aggregator | Score | |
| Aggregator | NS | PC |
|---|---|---|
| GameRankings | 71.25% | 71.25% |
| Metacritic | 72/100 | 68/100 |

The PC version of 911 Operator holds a 68 on Metacritic, indicating mixed or average reviews. CD-Action was supportive of the educational elements of the game, such as learning about symptoms related to medical conditions, but criticized that there was "hardly any game in 911 Operator." Alec Meer of Rock, Paper, Shotgun wrote that the game was "definitely effective at creating tension" but became "increasingly one-note" after a few hours of play. New Game Network's Alex V. also found that the game lacked substantial variety, noting that voice calls became repetitive and that the "game becomes a simple color-matching exercise" of sending appropriate personnel to the color-coded emergency icons. Overall, he found that 911 Operator had potential and a "winning formula" in its gameplay, but was ultimately limited by the lack of variety. Johnathan Irwin of Hooked Gamers gave the game a 7.0/10, praising its gameplay and the options for various maps, but noting that the game eventually became repetitive. Game Grin's Nathan Saretzky also gave 911 Operator a 7/10 rating, concluding that it was a "wonderfully executed arcade game" that succeeded at being "simple and fun". However, Saretzky criticized the repeated calls and felt that the gameplay would be better suited for a touch-based system.

The Xbox One release of 911 Operator received similarly mixed reviews. Xbox Tavern's Anthony Cole posited that it "houses an interesting idea but doesn't back it up with any depth," finding the game repetitive, simplistic, and boring. Neil Watton of The Xbox Hub also criticized the repetitive gameplay and "awkward" controls, though found the general concept of the game "clever". Writing for TrueAchievements, Marc Hollinshead praised its educational and strategical elements, but commented that "repetition creeps in quickly", particularly in regard to the repeated voice calls.

== Legacy ==
A sequel to the game, 112 Operator, was released on Steam on April 23, 2020. It received a score of 71 on Metacritic, indicating mixed or average reviews.
