= Superliminal =

2019 video game

- Developer: Pillow Castle Games
- Publisher: Pillow Castle Games
- Director: Albert Shih
- Producer: Christopher Floyd
- Designer: Logan Fieth
- Programmer: Phil Fortier
- Writer: Will O'Neill
- Composer: Matt Christensen
- Engine: Unity
- Platforms: macOS; Windows; Nintendo Switch; PlayStation 4; Xbox One; Linux; PlayStation 5; Xbox Series X/S; Android; iOS
- Release: Windows; November 12, 2019; Switch, PS4, Xbox One; July 7, 2020; macOS, Linux; November 5, 2020; PS5, Xbox Series X/S; November 21, 2022; iOS, Android; July 30, 2024
- Genre: Puzzle
- Modes: Single-player, multiplayer

Superliminal is a 2019 surreal puzzle video game released by Pillow Castle Games. The game, played from a first-person perspective, incorporates gameplay elements around optical illusions and forced perspective; notably, certain objects when picked up can be moved towards or away from the player, but when placed back down, scale to the size as the player had viewed them, enabling the player to solve otherwise impossible puzzles to complete the game.

Superliminal was released for Windows in November 2019, for Nintendo Switch, PlayStation 4, and Xbox One in July 2020, for macOS and Linux in November 2020, for PlayStation 5 and Xbox Series X/S in November 2022, and for iOS and Android in July 2024. It received generally positive reviews from critics. Multiplayer support and other modes were added to the game after launch.

== Gameplay ==
Superliminal is a puzzle video game played from the first-person perspective. The player-character is a participant in a dream therapy program, but during the study, the character becomes trapped in a recurring dream cycle, meaning that they will wake up from dreams in dreams, and is guided by the voice of the study's overseer, Dr. Glenn Pierce, on how to escape from the dream.

Most puzzles involve traversing through a series of rooms to reach their exits. The exit door may be closed and require a button to be held down to open, or atop a higher platform out of reach, or may not be immediately visible. To reach the exit, the player can manipulate certain objects in the game world. The bulk of such interactions are based on the use of forced perspective: the player can pick up a waist-high cube, which is then kept at its apparent current size from the player's perspective. The player can then look elsewhere around the room, with the cube maintained at the same viewpoint, and drop that cube at that location (at the furthest distance observed), where the cube will scale up or downwards in size based on the new perspective. Taking the waist-high cube and looking downwards towards the floor when dropping it will make the cube shrink in size, while looking upwards towards the ceiling and dropping will make it grow large. This process can be repeated indefinitely, allowing the player to manipulate these scalable objects as to create platforms to reach the exit or clear obstacles blocking them.

Later areas of the game introduce new mechanics to this. Some objects exist as trompe-l'œil illusions with segments of two-dimensional art on various walls and surfaces, and the player must find the appropriate angle to view the object and make it appear whole to then be able to grab it.

== Plot ==
The player heads to the Pierce Institute to get some therapy from its new SomnaSculpt technology which is designed to provide dream therapy to patients. They are put to sleep and placed in a testing environment constructed in their dreamworld, where they are capable of performing reality bending feats such as changing the size of items based on perspective or instantly creating copies of them. However, the player fails to wake up at their appointed time, ending up back inside the dreamworld. A Pierce Institute doctor, Dr. Glenn Pierce, communicates to the player through radios, explaining that they have completely lost track of the player, and that the player is likely traveling through successive dream layers. Meanwhile, the AI administering the dream therapy advises the player to initiate an "Explosive Mental Overload" in order to trigger the "Emergency Exit Protocol" and escape the dreamworld.

Eventually, the player travels through enough dream layers to trigger the Emergency Exit Protocol, but it fails due to an unknown error. The AI concludes that SomnaSculpt therapy failed to eliminate the player's negative emotions; hence they cannot leave the dreamworld. The AI then advises the player to find their own way out. With the player now trapped, the dreamworld becomes increasingly surreal. Eventually, the player creates a dream paradox and ends up in the realm of Whitespace where all sense of reality is lost.

The player is eventually able to navigate their way out of Whitespace, and Dr. Pierce congratulates them, revealing that the entire journey occurred just as planned, as it was a way to make the player see things from every different perspective, which will help them grow as a person. Dr. Pierce also advises that even though the therapy occurred in the dreamworld, everything the player learned is as real as they want it to be. The player then returns to the room they began in, where Dr. Pierce tells them to wake up.

== Development ==
Superliminal was developed by the six-member team of Pillow Castle, led by Albert Shih, a student from the Entertainment Technology Center (ETC) at Carnegie Mellon University. Shih had developed the foundation of the game while an undergraduate student at ETC around 2013 as part of a programming assignment, looking for "what kind of interesting first person game can I build by just moving cubes around?" He improved upon the concept during his graduate work, establishing Pillow Castle in January 2014 and obtaining assistance from four other ETC students to build out the game. Shih had been inspired by successful games like Risk of Rain and Antichamber that had been made by small teams to continue his work on Superliminal. Antichamber was particularly influential to Shih, as it directed and encouraged the player to think outside the box to discover the solutions to its puzzles, an idea he wanted to recapture in Superliminal. In a similar fashion, Shih likened Superliminal's scaling puzzles to the portal-based ones in Portal, designing the puzzles to create moments of epiphany for the player.

The core concept behind Superliminal is based on forced perspective, with Shih referencing the common tourist photos of people using forced perspective to appear as if they are pushing or holding up the Leaning Tower of Pisa. Achieving the scaling mechanic in the Unity engine was itself straight-forward according to Shih. When the player picks up an object, the game tracks the object's size and the distance. Then, as the player looks around, the game figures the new distance to the farthest point directly in front of the player, and scales the object's size proportional to the change from the original distance. The more difficult factor Shih had found was accounting for the complex shapes of some objects and where the player expected the center viewpoint to be at. Other puzzles in the game involving the projecting and de-projecting of 3D objects onto 2D planes used Unity's camera and projector objects with the only challenge being related to the camera depth, something that Shih said was not well-supported in Unity, but credits programmer Phil Fortier for solving. The scaling puzzles proved to have some trouble in playtesting since players could come up with possible solutions that ultimately were not working and the game unable to provide feedback for why. Instead of having players being able to jump, which the scaling made inconsistent, they instead let the player mantle up ledges, making it easier to guide players to a solution.

The game was revealed as Museum of Simulation Technology as a tech demo. The demo was first featured at the 2013 Tokyo Game Show during its Sense of Wonder Night, an event dedicated to indie games. The demo won the event's "Best Technology" and "Audience Award". The tech demo was publicly released in January 2014, along with submission into the Independent Games Festival (IGF) Student Competition for 2014, where it won along with Risk of Rain and Engare. The public tech demo became of high interest, with the Reddit subforum "/r/gaming" voting Shih's post announcing the demo as the 4th highest post as of 2015 with strong comparisons to Portal. By 2015, most of the ETC students who were working on the game had graduated and left Pillow Castle. Shih worked part-time on the game while working at other jobs. Shih spent much of the time since 2014 to evaluate the direction to take the game, eventually working full time on the game and hiring additional staff to complete the title.

The game was formally announced under the new title Superliminal in June 2019, It was announced for Windows as an Epic Games Store timed exclusive in August 2019, along with release of its full trailer. A PlayStation 4 version was announced in December 2019 with plans for release in April 2020. The PlayStation 4 release was delayed to July 7, 2020 alongside ports for the Xbox One and Nintendo Switch. PlayStation 5 and Xbox Series X/S versions were announced and released on November 21, 2022. Console ports of Superliminal were developed by PlayEveryWare. The game was released on Steam for computers on November 5, 2020. This version includes a developer commentary and a challenge mode. A free update in November 2021 brought a time-limited experimental multiplayer mode called "Group Therapy" to the Windows version based on the battle royale genre, where up to twelve players race through randomly-generated puzzle rooms to reach the exit to each first. A cooperative mode that allows up to four people to play through the game's story and five additional "Group Therapy" maps were added in a free update in December 2021.

== Reception ==
Reception

Aggregate score
Aggregator	Score
Metacritic	PC: 74/100; NS: 75/100; PS4: 80/100; XONE: 80/100

Review scores
Publication	Score
Destructoid	8/10
Edge	8/10
Game Informer	7.5/10
GameSpot	8/10
Nintendo Life	8/10
Nintendo World Report	8.5/10

Superliminal received "generally favorable reviews" according to review aggregator Metacritic. The game's core mechanic was praised, while criticism was leveled at the game's story and brief length.

=== Accolades ===
The game was nominated for "Game, Puzzle" at the NAVGTR Awards.
