= Power Play: How Video Games Can Save the World =

2017 book by Asi Burak and Laura Parker

Power Play
- US first edition hardback cover of Power Play
- Author: Asi Burak and Laura Parker
- Cover artist: Ellen Cipriano
- Language: English
- Genre: Nonfiction
- Publisher: St. Martin's Press (US)
- Publication date: 2017
- Publication place: United States
- Media type: Print (hardback and ebook)
- Pages: 258 (US Hardback)
- ISBN: 9781250089335 (Hardback) and ISBN 9781250089342 (ebook)

Power Play: How Video Games Can Save the World is a nonfiction book written by Asi Burak and Laura Parker. It was first published January 31, 2017, through St. Martin's Press.

== Synopsis ==
Power Play's main focus is on the influence that video games can have on society. The book expands upon the future benefits and opportunities that it can provide, and attempts to redirect current stereotypes of gamers and video games to expose the positive aspects that they bring to its users. Power Play also looks into virtual reality and touches upon the innovative change that can be achieved across the world through it as well as the problems that it can solve.

The book includes a "Power Playlist" made up of the various games and tools Burak and Parker mention in Power Play. Some of these games fall into the categories of human-based computation games and neurogaming and include PeaceMaker, The Cat and the Coup, and Nanocrafter.

== Reception ==
GeekDad reviewed Power Play, noting that "In Power Play, Asi Burak and Laura Parker have begun the discussion of how video games are pioneering innovative social change around the world and how they might continue to affect change in the future."
