= Neurogaming =

Type of gaming

Neurogaming is a nascent form of gaming that involves the use of brain–computer interfaces such as EEG so that users can interact with the game without the need of traditional controllers. It can be used as a novel and engaging type of gameplay, or as a way to create adaptive technology to improve accessibility in gaming. Some use cases show the combination of traditional controllers with direct brain inputs. It is worth noting that neurogaming is expected to become a significant advancement in the field of electronic entertainment. However, its applications are not limited to entertainment; neurogaming technologies also have considerable potential in medical fields.

Neurogaming is also possible in Multiplayer mode. Some use cases allow players to see the brain activity of other users while others do not incorporate brain data visualization into the experience.

Besides health industry neurogaming technologies represent interest to other various sectors like defense, sports and education.

"The player becomes a virtual agent in the game.. In the classroom it translates into a form of differentiated instruction."

One of the earliest neurogames is the racing game NeuroRacer, which was designed by Adam Gazzaley to improve the cognitive functioning of aging adults. Other early neurogames include "Throw Trucks With Your Mind" (which allows users to pick up and throw objects by mentally blocking distractions) and NeuroMage, which allows users to use a "relax the mind" technique to learn new spells and levitate the Millennium Falcon.

Among possible dangers and concerns surrounding neurogaming are ethical issues like mind control, brain intrusion and mind reading.
