= World of Goo 2 =

2024 video game

- Developers: 2D Boy; Tomorrow Corporation
- Publisher: Tomorrow Corporation
- Producer: Ron Carmel
- Designers: Kyle Gabler; Kyle Gray
- Programmers: Noel Llopis; Aleš Mlakar; Miguel Ángel Pérez Martínez; Allan Blomquist
- Artists: Kyle Gabler; Peter Hedin; Jay Epperson; Kyle Gray
- Writer: Kyle Gabler
- Composers: Kyle Gabler; Jonny Trengrove
- Platforms: Windows; macOS; Linux; Android; iOS; Nintendo Switch; PlayStation 4; PlayStation 5
- Release: August 2, 2024
- Genre: Puzzle
- Modes: Single-player; multiplayer

World of Goo 2 is a 2024 physics-based puzzle video game developed by independent game developers 2D Boy and Tomorrow Corporation. It is a sequel to World of Goo (2008). It was released on August 2, 2024, after being delayed from its previous release date of May 23, 2024.

== Gameplay ==
Like its predecessor, the game revolves around solving puzzles by constructing structures using Goo Balls. Players must strategically place and connect the Goo Balls to create stable constructions that allow them to overcome various environmental challenges and reach the exit points. The game builds on the core mechanics of the original, expanding the variety of Goo Ball types and introducing new gameplay elements to enhance the puzzle-solving experience.

== Plot ==
World of Goo 2 takes place many years after the original game. Goo Balls, previously believed to be extinct, begin resurfacing from underground after seismic events fracture the landscape. Alongside them appear pink squid-like creatures. The World of Goo Corporation resumes collection of Goo Balls and rebrands as the World of Goo Organization, under the guise of environmental responsibility. During a celebration event, the Goo Balls lower a hook into the sea and awaken a colossal sea creature. It then emits a beam of fire into the sky, which escapes the World of Goo's atmosphere and is noticed by a human figure on a distant planet far in the future, who begins constructing a rocket.

In the second chapter, the player travels to a derelict facility known as the Beauty Generator. Once a major power source fueled by a substance called “Beauty Juice,” (Note: As depicted in World of Goo (2008)) the facility has been decommissioned and repurposed to broadcast visual advertisements using satellite dishes. The signal is inactive, and the inhabitants have lost their connection to the outside world. The Goo Balls reactivate the satellite array, restoring the signal. The visual output, resembling the Generator’s former energy source, again reaches the distant observer, who continues work on the rocket.

The third chapter centers on a massive locomotive called the Atomic Express. Fueled by industrial quantities of Goo, the train lays its own tracks and is used by the Organization in an attempt to artificially accelerate the flow of time. Eventually, after 200,000 years, the train breaks through a decaying bridge and crashes.

In the fourth chapter, the player discovers a device called Ye Olde Reckonator, which serves as a gateway to fictional sequels and spin-off games within the World of Goo universe. One such sequence, styled as a noir detective narrative, features a character named Cliff Spanner investigating a disappearance in a dystopian city. This subplot is interrupted by a janitor character who reveals himself to be the Curator, a computer-like entity that has preserved the entire World of Goo franchise. However, the archive is accidentally erased when Spanner disconnects the Curator’s power source. A large beam of energy erupts from the destroyed archive, shooting into space and striking the distant observer’s rocket, which is en route to the World of Goo. The collision causes the rocket to crash into a mountain shaped like a tentacle.

The final chapter follows the last remaining Goo Balls as they ascend to the rocket’s crash site. With the help of aquatic life, the Goo Balls lift the rocket back into launch position. The rocket releases collection pipes across the world that draw in Goo Balls from various locations. Once fully fueled, the rocket launches into space and begins deploying Goo Balls onto barren planets. The game concludes with these worlds becoming “Worlds of Goo.”

== Development ==
Development of a sequel to World of Goo was reported on December 7, 2023. While the release date was initially set for May 23, 2024, it was later pushed to August.

=== Release ===
World of Goo 2 was released for PC and Nintendo Switch on August 2, 2024. A physical release for the Nintendo Switch was announced at the same time, scheduled for October 29, 2024. World of Goo 2 was also released on PlayStation 4 and 5 on April 25, 2025. A mobile version of World of Goo 2 including, iOS, Android, was released on April 25, 2025.

=== Translation ===
The translation was done by volunteers. The following languages are available in the game, on all platforms: English, French, German, Latin American Spanish, Castilian Spanish, Japanese, Brazilian Portuguese, Italian, Ukrainian, Simplified Chinese, Traditional Chinese, Korean, Polish, and Russian.

== Reception ==
Reception

Aggregate scores
Aggregator	Score
Metacritic	PC: 86/100; Switch: 82/100
OpenCritic	100%

Review scores
Publication	Score
Digital Trends	3.5/5
Nintendo Life	8/10
Shacknews	8/10

Initial critical reviews were positive, with a top critic average on OpenCritic of 82/100. Nintendo Life called the game "a fantastic sequel to a stone-cold classic." Shacknews suggested that "for fans of the first game, of course, World of Goo 2 is a no-brainer".
