= Henry Hatsworth in the Puzzling Adventure =

2009 video game

- North American box art
- Developer: EA Tiburon
- Publisher: Electronic Arts
- Director: Kyle Gray
- Designer: Peter Ong
- Programmer: Ryan Pijai
- Artist: Jay Epperson
- Composer: Gene Rozenberg
- Platform: Nintendo DS
- Release: NA: March 17, 2009; EU: March 20, 2009
- Genre: Puzzle-platform
- Mode: Single-player

Henry Hatsworth in the Puzzling Adventure is a 2009 puzzle-platform video game developed by EA Tiburon and published by Electronic Arts for the Nintendo DS. It involves a British adventurer, the eponymous Henry Hatsworth, who is on a mission to find the "Golden Suit", a garb that allows the wearer to control the "Puzzle Realm". The player must solve puzzles on the touch screen to destroy fallen enemies from the top screen.

== Gameplay ==
As the player defeats enemies on the top screen, they are sent to the bottom screen in the form of blocks.

While the game is an action-platformer on the top screen, once enemies are defeated by Hatsworth, they are sent to the bottom screen as puzzle blocks. The puzzle game on the bottom screen plays much like Nintendo's Puzzle League, as blocks need to be linked in a chain of three or more of the same color to be cleared, and any blocks resting on top of the cleared ones will fall into their place, potentially leading to a chain reaction of blocks being cleared if they fall into place and end up touching more of the same colors.

As the blocks on the puzzle screen rise, the enemy blocks that touch the upper edge of the screen are revived and can attack Hatsworth again on the top screen. The player can prevent this by swapping blocks to form groups of three or more, causing them to be destroyed, and their energy to add to the "Super Meter". Certain blocks may also power up Hatsworth's attacks, or restore his health, while others may hinder the player. If the Super Meter is filled, Hatsworth becomes younger, and his health increases. If it is then filled to double its capacity, the player can activate a mode called "Tea Time", causing Hatsworth to pilot a mecha (called his Robot Suit) and become invincible until the Super Meter depletes. Using the money earned by defeating enemies or collecting treasure, the player can return to Hatsworth's assistant's shop periodically to buy various upgrades.

== Plot ==
=== Story ===
Henry Hatsworth, the game's protagonist, is on a mission to find the lost pieces of the Gentleman's Suit, a suit of armour that allows the wearer to control a parallel world known as the Puzzle Realm, in order to obtain the valuable treasures inside this world. Hatsworth first finds a golden bowler hat that opens a rift between the worlds and allows him to manipulate this realm, and he resolves to find the rest of the Suit pieces to both stop Puzzle Realm monsters from entering his world and to claim their world's riches for himself. Each piece of the Suit gives him different special techniques, but Hatsworth and his assistant Cole find out that only the "master piece" of the golden suit is strong enough to seal the Puzzle Realm. Hatsworth's rival Weasleby gets it first and claims it has made him a god, but Henry defeats him although Weasleby manages to escape and kidnap Cole. Hatsworth chases after them and eventually defeats Weasleby again, only to discover that Weasleby was a robot. Upset that he never got credit and was always treated like a child and was not allowed to adventure with Hatsworth, Cole built Weasleby and tried to thwart Hatsworth. He sends The Machine, his greatest creation, to fight Hatsworth, but is ultimately defeated and Hatsworth is able to claim the Master Piece and seal the Puzzle Realm. A credits sequence reveals the fates of most of the game's major characters.

=== Worlds ===
Mysteria - a swampy jungle that gives way to a graveyard.

Skysland - a combination of floating islands, temple ruins and airships.

Atlantia - an ocean with volcanoes and an underwater city.

Puzzle Realm - the land unsealed by the Golden Suit; filled with treasures and monsters.

Tealand - an old-London style city.

== Development ==
The concept for Henry Hatsworth started as a prototype in Adobe Flash and was initially called Monkey Business. In a 2009 interview at Nintendo Life with Kyle Gray, where Kyle was asked if it was difficult to get Henry Hatsworth made at EA, Kyle had this to say. "Surprisingly, it wasn't too bad! I initially pitched the swell gents at Tiburon with a project idea which basically involved me doing some crazy stuff in Flash on my own. Luckily, they totally approved it, so I started making little DS game prototypes– which gradually led to the Monkey Business prototype, which ultimately became Hatsworth."

Henry Hatsworth in the Puzzling Adventure was created by Kyle Gray, who founded the Experimental Gameplay Project with Kyle Gabler, the creator of World of Goo, in 2005. Gray led a seven-man team at EA Tiburon to develop the game. The seven man team included; Kyle Gray as Director, Peter Ong as Lead Designer, Ryan Pijai as Lead Programmer, Bob Nystrom as Tools Programmer, Andrew Malesky as Animator, Jay Epperson as Art Director and Loel Phelps as Level Designer and Tileset Artist.

The art of the game was envisioned by art director Jay Epperson, using a mix of wood grain and paper-cut themes.

== Soundtrack ==
The original soundtrack of the game, composed by Gene Rozenberg, was released by Electronic Arts for free download on its website. It has since been removed after EA's redesign of the game's website.

== Reception ==
Reception

Aggregate score
Aggregator	Score
Metacritic	82 out of 100

Review scores
Publication	Score
Destructoid	9 out of 10
Edge	8 out of 10
Eurogamer	7 out of 10
Game Informer	7 out of 10
GamePro	4.5 out of 5
GameRevolution	B+
GameSpot	8.5 out of 10
GameTrailers	9.1 out of 10
IGN	9 out of 10
Nintendo Power	8 out of 10
The A.V. Club	B+
Wired	9 out of 10

Henry Hatsworth in the Puzzling Adventure received "favorable" reviews according to the review aggregation website Metacritic.

IGN's Mark Bozon commented that the game was "completely old school in design and execution", featuring "pop-up brawling, a wall jump that feels like Mega Man X, Mario-like platforming, and a great blend with the puzzle aspects". He commended the game's "beautiful" art style, but criticized the game for technical issues, and called the gameplay "unforgiving at times". GameSpot's Tom McShea also called both platforming and puzzle aspects "first-class" and "an absolute blast", with "tight controls and varied environments" as well as "fast and frantic" puzzle gameplay, but was frustrated by "the high difficulty in the later stages".

During the 13th Annual Interactive Achievement Awards, the Academy of Interactive Arts & Sciences nominated Henry Hatsworth for "Outstanding Achievement in Portable Game Design". It was also nominated for both Genre Award and Platform Award in GameSpot's Best of 2009.
