= Powerplay Cruiser =

1986 joystick

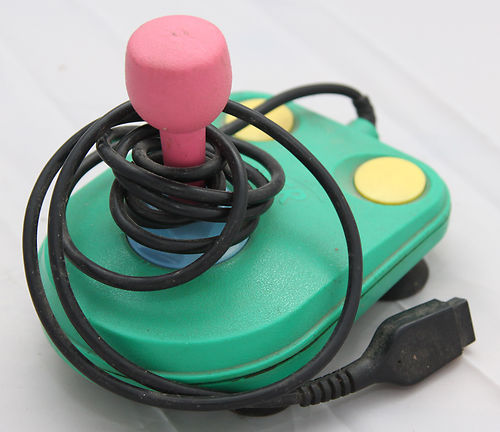
Pastel green body, with pastel yellow fire buttons, pastel pink joystick shaft and pastel blue torque controller

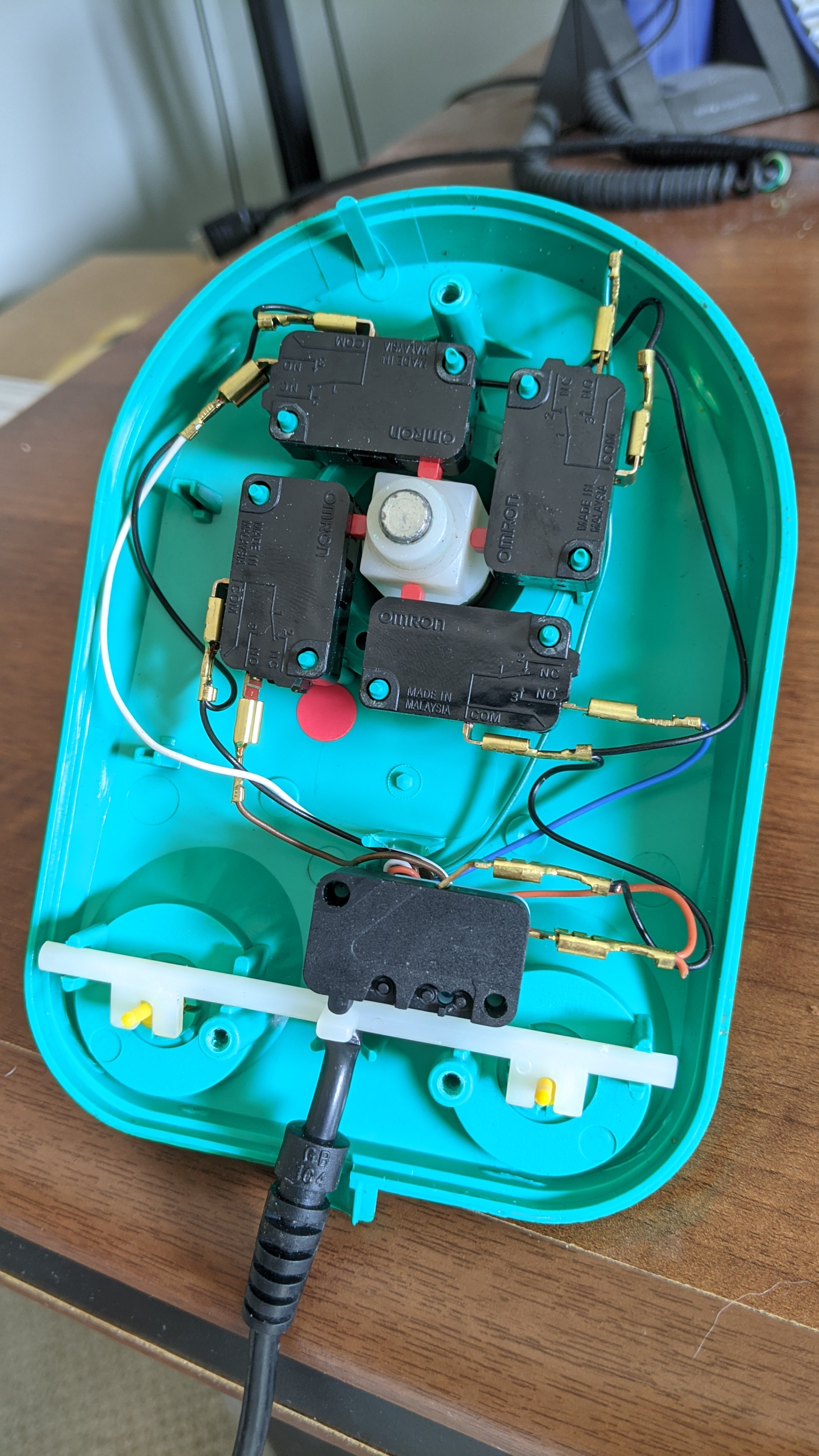
The internal structure of a Cruiser joystick

The Powerplay Cruiser was a joystick released in 1986, during the time that the Atari ST, ZX Spectrum, Commodore 64 and Commodore Amiga were all popular home computers. It was compatible with many 8-bit and 16-bit machines, and boasted many features that were considered high end at the time:

- Fully microswitch-based operation (clicking with every move or shot)
- 8-directional control
- Ambidextrous design (symmetrical with two fire buttons positioned at the front end, away from the joystick shaft)
- Adjustable torque control (a 3-position rotating collar at the base of the shaft, giving manual resistance)
- Rugged plastic body & sturdy, long-lasting design (working examples appear for auction on eBay and similar sites to this day)
- Available in a range of colours/models (all with black cable):
  - All Black
  - Blue body, red stick, white fire buttons
  - Pastel green body, with pastel yellow fire buttons, pastel pink joystick shaft and pastel blue torque controller
  - Transparent body, black stick and buttons featuring a rare autofire working-type, as it operates automatically when any of the 2 buttons is held down
  - The black and red Cruiser Turbo, featuring an autofire facility
    (the pastel version was arguably the most popular, matching the fashions of the era, followed by the sleek black model)

Other features included a cable that was longer than that used by many other joysticks, and four strong suction cups to attach the unit to a flat surface, for general stability or to enable control of rare (at the time) games that used the keyboard and other input devices to control play, such as Gunship.

The joystick had two DE-9 connectors. The primary connector was Atari compatible, with a shorter grey cable and connector attached to this. The secondary connector is compatible with the non-standard Amstrad built ZX Spectrum computers; the Sinclair Interface II and other popular ZX Spectrum joystick interfaces were Atari compatible.

== Market value ==
The Cruiser retailed in the UK at £14.99 when released, at a time when this was two or three times as expensive as many joysticks with lower manufacturing or design standards, and when most C64 games (on cassette) would cost less than £15 (their disk-based counterparts usually costing £15 or more) and with Commodore Amiga games costing approximately £20-£30. It was therefore a "luxury" joystick, aimed at serious gamers who required style and resilience in their peripherals.
