= Skyrates =

2006 video game

- Producer: Chuck Hoover
- Designers: Henry Clay, Phil Light, Sam Spiro, Seth Shain
- Programmers: Howard Braham, Bryan Cash, Jeremy Gibson, Seth Shain
- Artists: Chuck Hoover, Chris Daniel
- Engine: Flash
- Platform: Flash
- Release: NA: 2006
- Genre: MMORPG
- Mode: Multiplayer

Skyrates is a discontinued browser based massively multiplayer online game with a focus on sporadic play in a persistent world. It was in open beta. The development team was initially composed of students from the Entertainment Technology Center at Carnegie Mellon University. Players controlled anthropomorphic characters and purchased a variety of aircraft to fly to different areas called Skylands, taking part in combat and trading as they did so. There were over 19,500 registered characters as of October 2012, and there were generally between 30 and 200 people online at any one time.

Players in Skyrates progressed through the game mostly through purchase of planes, upgrades and guns for their planes. Players could compare their progress via leaderboards, or a system to search players based on their various stats. As it was in development Skyrates often reset all players' progress with a new version whenever the game had changed substantially. Skyrates's last version, 2.7, was released February 2012.

Inspired in part by TaleSpin, a 1990s-era Disney cartoon series, Skyrates was set in a world recovering from an apocalyptic war which reduced the remaining viable landmass to a collection of scattered islands. Ripped from the ground and cast adrift in the sky through the use of "unobtainium", these Skylands carried with them the last remnants of civilization. Split into several color-coded factions, the descendants of these survivors travelled and traded between the Skylands and were preyed upon en route by air pirates operating from smaller, unmapped "skylets".

With AdobeFlash's discontinuation on December 31, 2020, the client is no longer available. As of March 31, 2021, the forums were still online, but inactive. As of October, 2022, the forums are no longer online, though the domain (skyrates.net) is still reserved.

== Awards ==
On 20 February 2008, during the 2008 Independent Games Festival, Skyrates was named "First Runner-up" in the Gleemax Awards sponsored by Wizards of the Coast. The award included a cash prize of $3000.

Also in 2008 it was awarded "Best of 2008" in the Simulation category by Jay Is Games.
