= 20 Minutes Till Dawn =

2023 video game

- Developer: flanne
- Publishers: flanne; Erabit Studios
- Engine: Unity
- Platforms: macOS; Windows; Android; iOS; Nintendo Switch
- Release: macOS, Windows; June 8, 2023; Android, iOS; September 9, 2022; Nintendo Switch; December 21, 2023
- Genres: Roguelike, shoot 'em up
- Mode: Single-player

20 Minutes Till Dawn is a 2022 roguelike game created by the independent developer flanne. The player controls a character who fights against continuous waves of monsters, with the goal being to survive the onslaught until dawn. During each round a player earns gems, with which they are able to unlock additional characters, weapons, and runes for subsequent sessions. The gameplay of 20 Minutes Till Dawn is inspired by Vampire Survivors, with the main difference being that the characters in 20 Minutes Till Dawn do not attack or recharge their weapons automatically.

The game was released in early access on Steam on June 8, 2022, and was ported to Android and iOS by Erabit Studios on September 9, 2022. The game exited early access on Steam with version 1.0 on June 8, 2023. A Nintendo Switch port was released on December 21, 2023

== Gameplay ==
Gameplay screenshot.

The player selects one of multiple characters with different bonuses and abilities, the starting weapon, the stage, and the difficulty level. The player faces continuous waves of monsters, and has to survive the onslaught for 20 minutes. Vision is limited at the start of each round, with only the eyes of the monsters being visible as they approach the player in the dark, until they enter the player's field of vision. Defeated monsters drop gems, which serve both as currency and experience points. The player encounters many stronger boss monsters as well, who drop treasure chests containing special upgrades upon defeat. During the round, gems help the player level up, with each level allowing the player to pick one of four different randomly generated upgrades or new abilities. At the end of each session, the total accumulated gems can be spent in the main menu to unlock new characters, weapons, or runes. The gameplay of 20 Minutes Till Dawn is inspired by Vampire Survivors, but differentiates itself by having the player control not just the characters' movements, but their aim and combat as well.

The game has three different game modes: Standard (where each round lasts 20 minutes), Quickplay (where each round lasts 10 minutes), and Endless, with no time limit. For Standard and Quickplay, the player can choose the session's difficulty, called "Darkness". Each increase in Darkness reduces the player's efficacy, or increases that of the monsters they face, up to 15 times. Certain features and achievements are only obtainable if the player completes the game on Darkness 15.

The game's graphics are rendered in a complementary color scheme.

== Development ==
The game was developed and marketed by flanne for two months. He wanted to create his own take on Vampire Survivors but disliked the auto-combat, so he created a version of that game where the player takes a more active role.

The theme and character designs were created for marketing purposes: The first stage of the game is a graveyard with eldritch monsters, which allowed flannel to put the game under the "horror" tag on itch.io. This was a major source of traffic during the game's initial release, which allowed it to pick up steam under the "roguelike" tag after.

Prior to the full game's early-access release, flanne released a free demo version of the game called 10 Minutes Till Dawn, which had a more limited selection of characters and weapons, and sessions that lasted 10 minutes rather than 20. According to flanne, players found this naming convention confusing. While doing demographic research, flanne noticed that the majority of players active in Steam's free-to-play section were from China, and he tailored his character designs to appeal to that demographic: The playable characters are rendered in a style resembling anime, and all of them are female. Almost half of all players who played the demo were from China.

In June 2022, flanne signed over publishing rights to Erabit Studios for the mobile port. While initially appearing on the App Store with an estimated release date of December 21, 2022, the game was released on Android and iOS in September 2022.

On June 8, 2023, version 1.0 of the game was released on Steam, marking the end of the game's time in early access.

== Reception ==
20 Minutes Till Dawn was a commercial success, and earned more than half a million dollars within the first week of its early-access release on Steam. The game has been compared to Vampire Survivors due to its similarities in gameplay, with early-access reviewers commenting positively on the game's character roster, weapon variety, and upgrade trees.

Jonathan Bolding of PC Gamer noted that he enjoyed experimenting with different builds between runs. He felt that the characters available in the demo did not play very differently from each other, but that they could be optimized uniquely based on which weapon the player chose.

Eric Van Allen of Destructoid noted that build diversity could become a problem late in the game, as the player starts with a variety of different options, but all the builds funnel back into similar pickups, leading to "pretty same-y builds over time for a majority of the guns". He also commented on the game's visual style, saying that he "absolutely digs" the almost monochromatic look, but that it could cause the text to be difficult to read for some players.

Alice O'Connor of Rock Paper Shotgun similarly liked the look of the game and had a "grand old time" experimenting with different builds.

Ana Valens of The Mary Sue considered it her favorite game of 2022, especially due to the character designs, which she described as "lovely".
