= Suzanne Seggerman =

American nonprofit executive

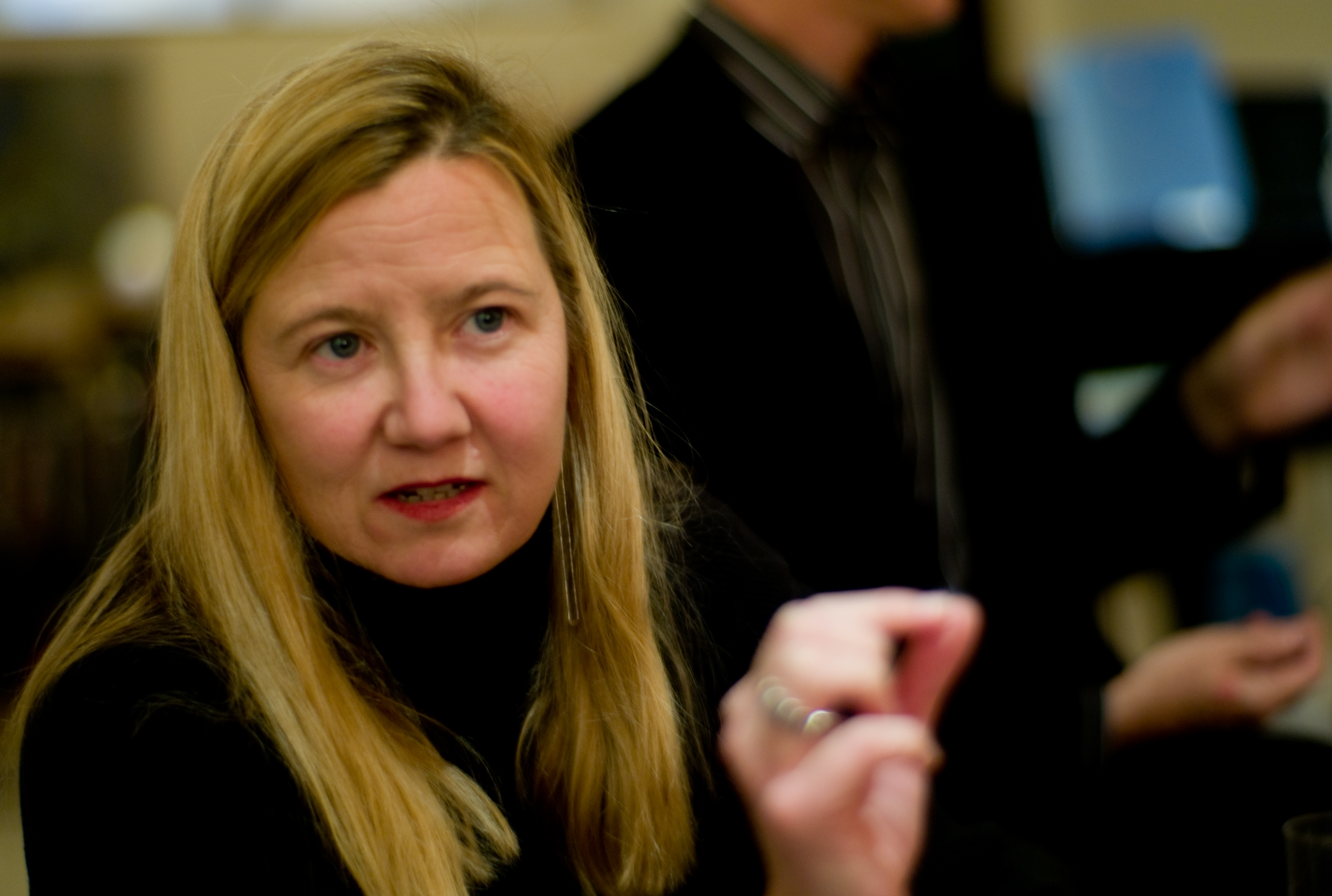
- Photo by MIT Media Lab Director Joi Ito

Suzanne Seggerman is the co-founder of Games for Change and is a public speaker and adviser on new media and social impact.

== Early life and education ==
Seggerman grew up in Fairfield, Connecticut, the daughter of Harry G. A. Seggerman, who had been vice chairman of Fidelity, and Anne Crellin Seggerman. She has five siblings; Patricia Seggerman, Marianne Seggerman, Yvonne Seggerman, Henry Seggerman, and John Seggerman. Seggerman received a B.A. from Kenyon College in Gambier, Ohio, and a master's degree from New York University’s Interactive Telecommunications Program (ITP).

== Career ==
Seggerman was production manager for the PBS documentary series The West, and then a director at new media think tank Web Lab, which was an early think tank dedicated to exploring and funding serious issues at the outset of the World Wide Web

Seggerman was co-founder and former president of Games for Change (G4C), a non-profit that promotes and supports the emerging uses of video games for humanitarian and educational purposes. Early examples of games for change include Honorable Justice Sandra Day O'Connor's suite of games called iCivics; Food Force a game about global hunger created by the World Food Programme; and Ayiti: the Cost of Life, a game about poverty set in Haiti. Seggerman ran G4C since its inception in 2004.

Seggerman also co-founded PETLab (Prototyping Education and Technology Lab), a public interest design and research lab at Parsons The New School for Design, supported by grants from MTV and the MacArthur Foundation.

She has spoken at Sundance Film Festival and has advised on Microsoft’s Imagine Cup.

== Legal issues ==
In October 2010, Seggerman pleaded guilty to conspiracy and tax fraud related to a $12 million 2001 inheritance her family received in a Swiss bank account from her father. On September 9, 2014, her sentencing had been postponed pending the outcome of the family financial adviser, Michael Little's, trial. She was a cooperating witness in that trial, and in 2014, and again in 2019, the probation department recommended probation.

On June 26, 2019, Seggerman along with her siblings Henry, Yvonne, and John were each sentenced to prison. She received a four-month sentence which she completed in December 2019. The siblings had funneled their inherited money into the U.S. tax-free through a variety of means: shell companies, a fraudulent foundation, and carrying just under $10,000 cash on return trips from Switzerland.
