= 7 Billion Humans =

2018 video game

- Developer: Tomorrow Corporation
- Publisher: Tomorrow Corporation
- Platforms: Linux; macOS; Windows; Nintendo Switch; iOS; Android
- Release: WW: August 23, 2018; Switch: WW: October 25, 2018; iOS: WW: December 6, 2018; Android: WW: July 1, 2021
- Genre: Puzzle
- Mode: Single-player

7 Billion Humans is a puzzle video game developed and published by American studio Tomorrow Corporation. It was released on August 23, 2018, for Microsoft Windows, macOS, Linux, and the Nintendo Switch on October 25, 2018. The game was later released for Android on July 25, 2021. Designed as a sequel to Human Resource Machine, players solve puzzles by moving multiple data cubes with human workers using an in-game programming language.

== Gameplay ==
Similar to Human Resource Machine, players are tasked with over 60 programming puzzles, typically involving the movement of numerical data cubes by human workers. For example, a task might ask the player to program the humans to sort the numbers on data cubes in order. The programming language is similar to assembly language, allowing for simple loops, logic, memory storage and calculations. As with its predecessor, the code can be edited in a textual form by copying-and-pasting.

The same program is used to control all humans simultaneously, while allowing each human to follow its individual logic through the project based on their current state, such as moving left or right based on comparing the value of the data cube they are holding. The humans will run through the program until either the program solution is met, or all the humans reach the end of the program and the problem solution is not met, in which case the player must rework the program. The player is able to step through the program and select any individual human to watch their progress through the program for debugging purposes.

Once a player achieves a working solution for a given problem, the game will then simulate 25 additional cases where random factors (such as values of data cubes) change, which might cause a program to fail and require the player to account for that. Otherwise, the player is then ranked on the number of program steps they have, and the number of seconds (cycles) it takes for the program to complete, measured against average marks determined by Tomorrow Corporation. Most levels provide two optional challenges, to beat the average steps and average seconds with optimization of their program; these are sometimes diametric goals and do not need to be completed within the same program. Other puzzles are fully optional, requiring more advanced techniques to solve.

== Reception ==
Reception

Aggregate score
Aggregator	Score
Metacritic	NS: 77/100

Review scores
Publication	Score
4Players	79%
Nintendo World Report	8.5/10
Pocket Gamer	4.5/5
Stuff (magazine)	5/5

The game was generally reviewed positively by critics. Destructoid called the game "work...but enjoyable work" and stated that while there "could be some hard-to-ignore faults", that overall "the experience is fun." Harry Slater of Pocket Gamer summarised the game as "a brilliant mixture of coding, humour, and puzzling," rating it 4.5/5 stars.
