= 112 Operator =

2020 video game

- Developer: Jutsu Games
- Publishers: Games Operators, SONKA, Ultimate Games
- Engine: Unity
- Platforms: Android, iOS, Macintosh, Nintendo Switch, PlayStation 4, Windows, Xbox One, Xbox Series
- Release: Windows, Mac: WW: 23 April 2020; iOS: WW: 8 October 2020; Android; 21 October 2020; Switch: WW: 23 July 2021; PS4, Xbox: US: 30 September 2024
- Genres: Simulation, Strategy
- Mode: Single-player

112 Operator is a 2020 video game developed by Jutsu Games and published by Games Operators, with a Nintendo Switch port released by SONKA in 2021 and a PlayStation 4 port by Ultimate Games in 2024. The game is a strategy simulation title in which players manage emergency services and send first responders to calls, making decisions on which services to dispatch. The game received several downloadable content updates, expanding the number of emergencies, services and scenarios. Upon release, the game received average reviews.

== Gameplay ==
Gameplay

112 Operator is a strategy simulation video game in which players assume the role of an operator receiving emergency calls, and managing resources to send first responders. Gameplay is undertaken on a map of territory, where throughout the day the player will receive calls of incidents. Players must send specific teams in available vehicles to respond, with the appropriateness of the responder and vehicle depending on the call. Some calls can handled unsuccessfully, such as the players failing to dispatch services in time, or providing the wrong response to the emergency. As players complete calls, they will expand the number of districts under their control and receive more calls, and earn money which they can use to buy new vehicles and hire new personnel. The game features three difficulty modes, and scenarios based on real-world disasters such as the 2020 California wildfires.

== DLC ==
112 Operator received several downloadable content add-ons, including:

Title	Release date	Description
Facilities	17 September 2020	Adds new utilities, including CCTV, speed cameras and drones, field stations to deploy mobile emergency services, and additional scenarios.
Water Operations	30 December 2020	Adds new natural disasters, including floods and tsunamis, water vehicles including jet skis and motor boats, and additional scenarios.
Pandemic Outbreak	29 April 2021	A new scenario that requires players to address the COVID-19 pandemic, deploying staff with personal protective equipment and quarantining citizens.
The Last Duty	14 July 2021	A zombie-themed scenario in which players must manage an infectious disease and deploy military units to fight off the infected.

== Reception ==
Reception

Aggregate score
Aggregator	Score
Metacritic	73/100

Review scores
Publication	Score
Pocket Gamer	4.5/5
Digitally Downloaded	2.5/5

112 Operator received "mixed or average" reviews, according to review aggregator Metacritic. Describing the title as a "decent game", Meristation praised the title's "addictive" mechanics and tension, but felt the game was "superficial" and lacked enough depth to have "narrative or dramatic power" as a representation of how emergency services work.
