= Games for Change =

Nonprofit organization

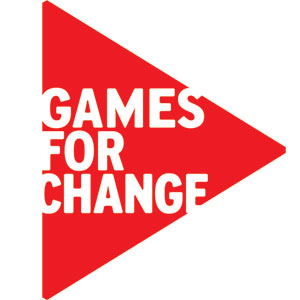
- Founded: 2004; 22 years ago
- Founders: Benjamin Stokes, Barry Joseph, and Suzanne Seggerman
- Type: 501(c)(3) organization
- Purpose: Video games and virtual reality
- Location: New York City, New York
- Region served: Worldwide
- President: Susanna Pollack
- Employees: 10–15
- Website: gamesforchange.org

Games for Change (also known as G4C) is a nonprofit organization. The organization provides support, visibility, and shared resources to individuals and organizations using serious games for social change. It also runs the G4C Student Challenge, a STEM competition that teaches middle and high school students about game design and computer programming.

== History ==
Games for Change was founded by Benjamin Stokes, Suzanne Seggerman, and Barry Joseph in 2004. The organization's first event was held in 2004 hosted by the New York Academy of Sciences and provided an opportunity for nonprofit organizations, foundations, and game developers to explore how digital games could be used to support impact causes.

== Games for Change Festival ==
The Games for Change (G4C) Festival is an annual conference in New York City that highlights games, technology, and immersive experiences. It was also called the "Sundance for video games and immersive media" by Forbes in 2019. Each year, the festival has over 100 sessions across four programming tracks: Games for Learning, Civics and Social Issues, Health and Wellness, and XR for Change. Many notable speakers have participated in the Festival, including U.S. Vice President Al Gore, former Associate Justice of the Supreme Court of the United States Sandra Day O'Connor, and president of the Entertainment Software Association Stan-Pierre Louis.

During the G4C Festival, the Games for Change Awards competition honors games that positively impact their communities and promote social good. While Games for Change organizes the awards program, winners are determined by peer review. Past winners include Life Is Strange, Discovery Tour by Assassin's Creed: Ancient Egypt, and the Nintendo Labo. Recent winners include Sky: Children of the Light by thatgamecompany and Dreams by Media Molecule. In addition to its main categories (Best Gameplay, Most Innovative, Best Learning Game, Most Significant Impact, Best XR for Change Experience, Best Student Game), Games for Change also honors individuals with the Vanguard Award and organizations with the Industry Leadership Award. In 2020, Games for Change honored Humble Bundle with the inaugural G4C Giving Award, recognizing its innovative fundraising methods that support charitable organizations.

In 2020, Games for Change announced that the annual Games for Change Festival would be virtual for the first time in its 17-year history. It was also free to attend, introducing global attendees to how games and immersive media are being used for good. Games For Change President Susanna Pollack noted that the G4C Festival saw increased engagement during their period of virtual hosting, obtaining a global reach of 7000 recorded attendees across two years. In 2022, the G4C Festival officially transitioned to a hybrid in-person and virtual format. Its first two days were located in the Times Center and the Microsoft Technology Center in New York City, while the final two days were hosted using the Hopin virtual platform.

== Games for Change Student Challenge ==
The Games for Change Student Challenge is a STEM competition that teaches middle and high school students about game design and computer programming. The program provides a game design curriculum for students and encourages them to create a game based on a social impact theme. Since the competition takes place in various locations (New York City, Detroit, Atlanta, and Los Angeles), Games for Change partners with local organizations to support each community. For example, in 2017, Games for Change partnered with the Annenberg Foundation and Riot Games to bring the program to over 600 Los Angeles students, encouraging them to create games about wildlife conservation, climate change, and kindness.

== Games curation ==
The organization also curates a continuously growing body of "digital and non-digital games that engage contemporary social issues in a meaningful way".

The video game Sweatshop is an example of a past digital game curated by the Games for Change organization. Launched in 2011 by Littleloud, it is a strategy game about offshore clothing manufacturing. The player plays the role of a factory manager responsible for hiring workers, completing store orders, and meeting the demands of clients while trying to balance ethical decisions with rising demands. The game has 30 levels that increase in difficulty and complexity, and introduce new worker types and real-world sweatshop problems such as fires, unions and the lack of toilets that add authenticity to the game mechanics. The game utilizes the mechanics of tower defense, which have been used in many entertainment games such as Plants vs. Zombies. In Sweatshop, the clothing materials on the conveyor belt can be likened to “enemies”, and the factory workers who turn the materials into finished product can be seen as the defending “troops”. The use of tower defense mechanics allows the player to strategize how they will meet client demands in each level. The player must choose either to keep the workers safe and satisfied or sacrifice their well-being for factory efficiency, and because of these difficult decisions the game has been known for its ability to evoke guilt in players. Many players have reported their struggle to keep workers safe when trying to win more difficult levels. Littleloud worked with the British charity Labour Behind The Label to ensure the game was factually accurate, but due to controversy over its content the game was eventually removed from the Apple App store. Another curated title is Gamer Girl, an interactive visual novel that highlights a female protagonist in conflict with a male dominated programming class. The game is based on a "stalker twist," on the dating simulator game genre.The game allows players to navigate realistic classroom scenarios and make choices related to setting boundaries, responding to inappropriate behavior, and building inclusive communities.
