= World of Goo =

2008 puzzle video game

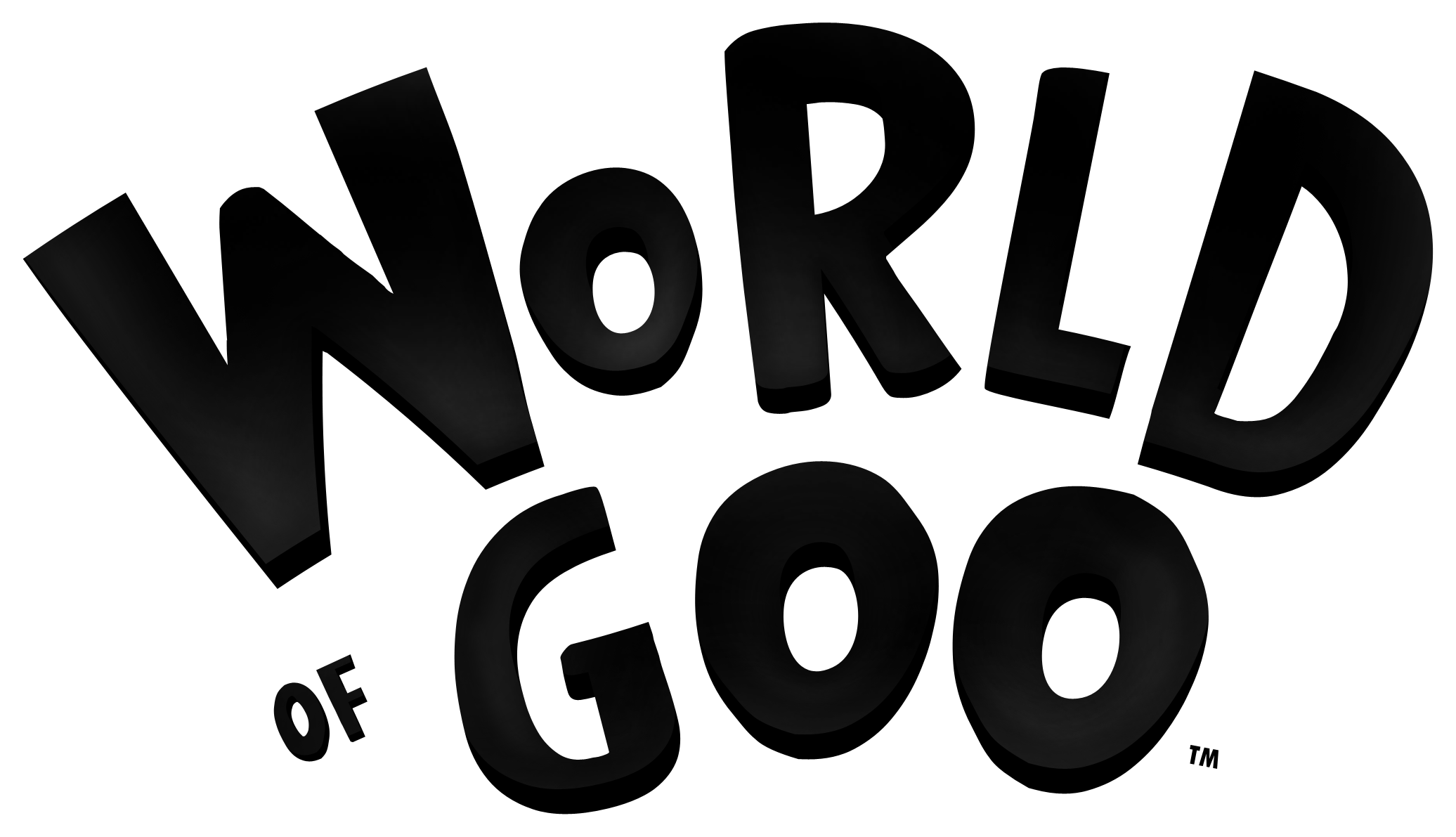
- Developer: 2D Boy
- Publishers: 2D Boy; JP: Nintendo (Wii); Brighter Minds Media (retail, USA); Tomorrow Corporation (NS); Microsoft Game Studios (GFWL)
- Producer: Ron Carmel
- Designer: Kyle Gabler
- Programmers: Ron Carmel; Allan Blomquist
- Artist: Kyle Gabler
- Writer: Kyle Gabler
- Composer: Kyle Gabler
- Platforms: Wii; Windows; OS X; Linux; iOS; Android; BlackBerry OS; Nintendo Switch
- Release: October 13, 2008: Wii; NA: October 13, 2008; EU: December 19, 2008; JP: April 21, 2009; Windows; NA: October 13, 2008; PAL: December 12, 2008; OS X; WW: November 2, 2008; Linux; WW: February 12, 2009; iOS; WW: December 16, 2010; Android; WW: November 28, 2011; BlackBerry OS; WW: January 21, 2013; Nintendo Switch; NA: March 16, 2017; PAL: March 23, 2017; JP: May 25, 2017
- Genre: Puzzle
- Modes: Single-player, multiplayer

World of Goo is a physics-based puzzle video game developed and published by independent game developer 2D Boy. The game was released on Windows and Wii on October 13, 2008, with releases on Nintendo Switch, OS X, Linux, and various mobile devices in subsequent years. World of Goo has the player use small balls of goo to create bridges and similar structures over chasms and obstacles to help other goo balls reach a goal point, with the challenge to use as few goo balls as possible to build this structure.

The game was nominated for numerous awards—the Seumas McNally Grand Prize, Design Innovation Award, and Technical Excellence—at the Independent Games Festival, and has gone on to win several other gaming awards, such as Outstanding Achievement in Game Design at the 12th Annual Interactive Achievement Awards. The game was critically acclaimed and became one of the earliest examples of a commercially successful indie game.

A sequel, World of Goo 2, was released on August 2, 2024, in collaboration with Tomorrow Corporation.

== Gameplay ==
=== Overview ===
Placing a goo ball to construct a bridge

The game is built around the idea of creating large structures using balls of goo. The game is divided into five chapters, each containing several levels. Each level has its own graphic and musical theme, giving a unique atmosphere. There is also a bonus meta-game called World of Goo Corporation, where the objective is to build the highest tower using goo balls which the player collected through the course of the game. Players from all over the world can compete, as the height of the tower and number of goo balls used are being constantly uploaded to the 2D Boy server.

=== Objective ===
The main objective of the game is to get a requisite number of goo balls to a pipe designed to represent the exit. In order to do so, the player must use the goo balls to construct bridges, towers, and other structures to overcome gravity and various terrain difficulties such as chasms, hills, spikes, windmills, or cliffs. There are several types of goo balls in the game, each of which has unique properties. The player must exploit combinations of these goo balls in order to complete each level. Extra goos recovered in the pipe are pumped through to World of Goo Corporation, a sandbox area where the objective is to compete with other players worldwide by building the tallest tower possible. Players can also try to achieve the "Obsessive Completion Distinction Flag" for each level by completing the level under more stringent criteria, such as collecting a larger number of Goo balls, finishing under a set amount of time or using as few moves as possible.

The WiiWare version includes multiplayer with up to four people on the same Wii. This facility is also available, albeit unsupported, in the Linux port.

=== Levels ===
World of Goo is split up into four chapters and an epilogue, each containing a number of levels. The chapters are set over the course of a year in the World of Goo. Each chapter takes place over one season, beginning in the start of summer, and ending during the spring of next year. (Note: The last winter level, Product Launcher, has "happy new year" as its tagline. This is similar to Northern Hemisphere seasons.) The 4th chapter is seasonless, and is set in a virtual world. Levels and chapters in the game are interspersed with cut scenes.

An additional location reached from the main menu is the World Of Goo Corporation. Goo Balls collected above and beyond the required amount to pass a level are piped out of each of the played levels to here. The aim is to build the highest possible tower with only the accumulated extra Goo Balls. Towers built by other players are represented by clouds bearing the player's name, nationality, and height of the tower, including details on the total number of balls collected by the player and how many were used in constructing their tower. The altitude of each cloud represents the height of that player's tower. An online leaderboard charts the heights of the top 50 towers, as well as the top 10 players for each level of the game.

There are a total of 48 levels in the game, including World of Goo Corporation.

In an interview, the developers stated that the retail version released in Europe would receive an additional sixth chapter, set on the Moon. Few details were disclosed, but reportedly this chapter would have featured a freeform sandbox mode, similar to that of the World of Goo Corporation. This addition was canceled for Wii when 2D Boy announced they were releasing the game on WiiWare in Europe. Eventually, the idea was put on hold for all platforms, as 2D Boy felt they were rushing to finish extra content to justify the price, stating that "if we release any additional content, we will make it available on all platforms, to all people, at the same time. No more of this 'region' nonsense".

== Plot ==
The story of the game is primarily told through cutscenes and signs scattered throughout various levels, which are attributed to an unseen character known as the Sign Painter.

In the beginning of the game, it is revealed that pipes have been appearing throughout the world, disturbing many Goo Balls in their natural habitats. Filled with a childlike sense of curiosity and naivety, they build themselves towards the pipes. Upon reaching the pipe entrance, the Goo Balls are sucked by the pipe system into the "World of Goo Corporation" main building where they are processed into many products. The excess Goo Balls are left outside the Corporation headquarters where they together begin to build a giant tower. At the end of the first chapter, some Goo Balls escape from a Corporation building by attaching themselves to eyeballs which have the ability to fly. The chapter ends with the Goo Balls "seeing far away new lands".

The second chapter takes place on an island where World of Goo Corporation is searching for a new power source, due to wind power not being sufficient anymore. However, the location and appearance of the power source was forgotten, because in the past, it stopped producing electricity. (Note: "Lately, its output has been less than satisfactory." – Fly Away Little Ones, Little Miss World of Goo, World of Goo) A new Goo Ball is introduced, which is ground up by the Corporation into a facial cream. Near the end of the chapter, the power plant, which looks like a giant woman, is discovered. It is revealed that for many years, its remarkably powerful "beauty juice" powered the world. Yet with age, her beauty and consequently her electric output began to die. However, once unrefined beauty goo is injected directly into her forehead by the player, her youthful beauty is restored. At the expense of her ability to move her face, the world is supplied with large amounts of power. With this newfound energy, a factory doing outsourced work for World of Goo Corporation opens in the south.

During the third chapter it is said that the factory is developing a mysterious "Product Z." It eventually turns out that the mysterious Product Z is actually the third dimension (Product Z is the Z axis in mathematics). After the launch of Product Z, the player is informed that they are "incompatible with the world" due to the game being made up of only two-dimensional graphics, and is instructed to contact tech support in the information superhighway.

In the fourth chapter the player sets out to find the mysterious "MOM" program in the information superhighway. Shortly after the beginning the Goo Balls find the object responsible for rendering all the graphics. After pumping many of their own kind into the object, the graphics rendering improves, creating a more realistic environment (and the Pixel Goo Balls). Near the end they encounter MOM, who turns out to be a spam bot. Hoping to convert the world back to 2D, the player tries to overload World of Goo Corporation by having MOM send every spam email ever sent to everyone at World of Goo Corporation. After the player ventures to the Recycle Bin and un-deletes all the spam email, World of Goo Corporation receives the mail and, unable to deal with so much spam, explodes, shutting down Product Z while creating a massive layer of smog, dust, smoke and debris that envelops the entire world.

In the final chapter, it is revealed that all Goo Balls, except "scientifically pure" ones, have been sucked away to the former site of World of Goo Corporation. The remaining Goo Balls decide to work their way up the world's tallest island to reach a site where the telescope is located. The final level of the game reveals that the Goo Balls are now completely extinct, all the remaining having been sucked away to the shattered remains of World of Goo Corporation and added to the tower, and the gigantic telescope at the site has been rendered useless as it cannot see past the layer of smog. The Sign Painter reveals in his final sign that he has now become the Telescope Operator. Some balloon-like fish in the sea connect to the telescope and lift it out of the ground, where it breaks through the layer of smog and sees the tower of goo that has been built at the former World of Goo Corporation Headquarters, which can also see past the smog. The telescope falls back to the ground before it could see what the Goo Balls were building towards. A final and last cutscene reveals their goal; the camera pans up into space to reveal that the Goo Balls that escaped at the end of Chapter 1 have managed to reach a far-off planet populated by Goo Balls.

== Development ==
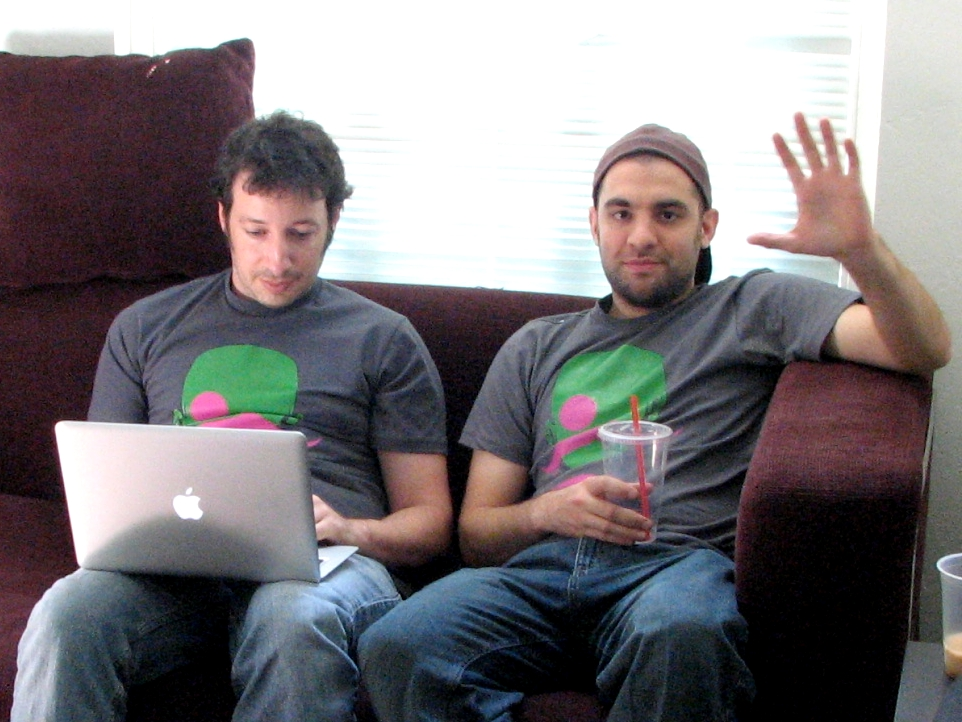
Ron Carmel and Kyle Gabler, founders of 2D Boy and creators of World of Goo

World of Goo was developed by 2D Boy, a team based in San Francisco consisting only of former Electronic Arts employees Kyle Gabler and Ron Carmel. The game's development was started in January 2005 as a graduate student project at the Entertainment Technology Center of Carnegie Mellon University. Gabler created this initial prototype in four days and submitted it under the title Tower of Goo for the Experimental Gameplay Project at the university as a response to the prompt "make something with springs".

Carmel and Gabler estimated that development on World of Goo lasted two years and cost US$10,000 of their personal savings, which included equipment, food, and rent. Actual development was usually carried out in coffeehouses equipped with Wi-Fi hotspots.

World of Goo was programmed using available open-source technologies, including Simple DirectMedia Layer, Open Dynamics Engine for physics simulation, TinyXML for configuration files, Subversion, Mantis Bug Tracker, and PopCap Games Framework. Allan Blomquist, a friend of Gabler and Carmel, was responsible for porting and optimizing the game for WiiWare.

On July 6, 2010, 2D Boy, Capybara Games, and thatgamecompany started a program called the "Indie Fund", which aims to support game development, by helping independent developers become financially independent.

=== Release ===
World of Goo was released both for Windows and WiiWare in North America on October 13, 2008. The Mac OS X version was released on November 2. The Linux version was released on February 13, 2009. After the initial release, 2D Boy announced a bonus patch called "Profanity Pack", which would "[replace] the normal voices in the game with naughty words." The patch would be made available to users who pre-ordered the game. The patch was never released.

2D Boy decided against placing digital rights management (DRM) protection on the PC versions, stating that "DRM is a futile attempt to prevent piracy, and it's expensive. Every game for which there is demand will be cracked and find its way onto the scene, so why waste time and money trying to prevent the inevitable?" 2D Boy later reported that the PC versions of World of Goo were extensively pirated, with a rough estimate that 90% of copies were pirated.

For the game's European release in December, 2D Boy depended upon the community to translate and localize World of Goo into the appropriate languages, including Dutch, French, German, Italian and Spanish. During the 2009 D.I.C.E. Summit, Nintendo announced that it would publish World of Goo in Japan during the second quarter of 2009; the game was released on April 21, 2009, under the title Planet of Goo (グーの惑星, Gū no Wakusei).

World of Goo was made available through Microsoft's Windows Games on Demand marketplace as a Games for Windows – Live title on December 15, 2009. World of Goo was also ported to iOS, to iPad in December 2010 and to iPhone in April 2011. On October 3, 2011, 2D Boy announced that they would port World of Goo to Android, which was released on November 28, 2011. It was available to both Android phones and tablets with demo and full versions available. Tomorrow Corporation, formed by Gabler in 2010 along with his former EA colleagues Allan Blomquist and Kyle Gray, would develop and publish World of Goo for the Nintendo Switch which was released in March 2017. The Japanese version was later released in May 2017 by Flyhigh Works.

According to 2D Boy, Epic Games reached out to them to release World of Goo as a free promotional title on the Epic Games Store. The developers decided to use this opportunity to create an updated version for Windows, Mac, and Linux systems, incorporating changes and improvements made from the console versions. This includes supporting widescreen and higher resolutions that have become the normal since the game's original release, and stripping out the game's digital-rights management to make it amenable to modding. These updates will be offered free to users on other digital storefronts like Steam and GOG.com, with the patches to be released around the same time that the Epic Games Store promotion starts in May 2019. Netflix released a remastered version on May 23, 2023, also available on Google Play Store and Apple's App Store. It requires a Netflix subscription to play.

=== Soundtrack ===
The World of Goo soundtrack was created by Kyle Gabler, who also designed, wrote and illustrated the game. It was released as a free download on January 20, 2009.

The song "World of Goo Beginning" was created with the intention of resembling Libertango by Ástor Piazzolla. "Regurgitation Pumping Station" was originally written for a friend's short film about going on a date with the devil. "Threadcutter" was originally written for a game called Blow which Gabler made available on his site. "Rain Rain Windy Windy" was originally written for the soundtrack for a short children's film, commenting that writing children's music is difficult. "Jelly" was originally written for a virtual reality world. "Burning Man" was written for a friend's drama/mystery series. He made it by recording two friends singing single notes, and then using a keyboard to make it sound like a choir. "Cog in the Machine" was originally written for another game of his called Robot and the Cities who Built Him.

== Reception ==
Reception

Aggregate scores
Aggregator	Score
Metacritic	PC: 90/100; WII: 94/100 iOS: 96/100; NS: 84/100
OpenCritic	85/100; 88% Critics Recommend

Review scores
Publication	Score
1Up.com	A
Eurogamer	WII: 10/10; PC: 9/10
GameSpot	9/10
IGN	9.5/10
Nintendo World Report	10/10
Official Nintendo Magazine	95/100

Both Wii and Windows versions of World of Goo received critical acclaim, holding an aggregate score from Metacritic of 94/100 and 90/100 respectively. Eurogamer called World of Goo "Physics' latest, purest, and most brilliant gift." IGN said of the Wii version "World of Goo is an amazing WiiWare game that you simply must buy for this is exactly the type of software that needs both recognition and support", finding only minor fault with the camera controls and lack of a level editor. 1UP.com called World of Goo "one of just a handful of truly excellent original games for the Wii". Nintendo World Report criticized the "slow start" of the game, but otherwise praised it as "easily the best WiiWare game to date and, perhaps, one of the best this generation." Resolution Magazine referred to it as "an instant classic", awarding it 90%. Official Nintendo Magazine awarded the Wii version a score of 95%, claiming it to be "Virtually flawless". The magazine also ranked it as the 83rd best game available on Nintendo platforms. The staff called it the best WiiWare game "by a long shot."

World of Goo has won many awards. At the 2008 Independent Games Festival, World of Goo won the Design Innovation Award and the Technical Excellence award, and it was also nominated for the Seumas McNally Grand Prize. As a result, 2D Boy found publishers that had previously rejected them approaching them to publish the title. It won Best Independent Game from the Spike TV Video Game Awards show, and won six Wii-specific awards and one for the PC, including Best Puzzle Game, Best Artistic Design, Best WiiWare Game, Best New IP, Most Innovative Design, and Game of the Year from IGN. GameSpot awarded it as the Best Game No One Played. The Academy of Interactive Arts & Sciences awarded World of Goo with "Outstanding Achievement in Game Design" (along with a nomination for "Casual Game of the Year") at the 12th Annual Interactive Achievement Awards. It was featured in Eurogamer's top 50 games of 2008 in the tenth slot. Peter Moore, the head of EA Sports, in a rant about FIFA 09 being missing from Eurogamer's list, commented that he was surprised World of Goo was included up so high in the list, despite not having played it. 2D Boy responded by saying they were honored that World of Goo had this much mainstream awareness, and that it derives sick pleasure from the "industry big-wig's indignant, self-righteous incredulity". In 2010, the game was included as one of the titles in the book 1001 Video Games You Must Play Before You Die.

== Sequel ==
2D Boy initially stated that they would not be producing a sequel. However, in a November 2010 entry on the World of Goo blog, Kyle Gabler stated that "a second World of Goo is a possibility and something we would enjoy working on."

World of Goo 2, a sequel developed by 2D Boy and Tomorrow Corporation, was announced at The Game Awards 2023 and was released on August 2, 2024.
