= Sports Champions 2 =

2012 video game

- North American cover art
- Developers: San Diego Studio; Zindagi Games
- Publisher: Sony Computer Entertainment
- Composer: David Bergeaud
- Platform: PlayStation 3
- Release: NA: October 30, 2012; AU: November 1, 2012; EU: November 2, 2012
- Genre: Sports
- Modes: Single-player, Multiplayer

Sports Champions 2 is a 2012 sports video game developed by San Diego Studio and Zindagi Games and published by Sony Computer Entertainment for the PlayStation 3. It utilizes the PlayStation Move controller. It is the sequel to Sports Champions. New functions include boxing, golf, bowling, skiing, and tennis.

== Reception ==
Reception

Aggregate score
Aggregator	Score
Metacritic	69/100

Review scores
Publication	Score
4Players	70%
Famitsu	24/40
GameRevolution	8/10
IGN	7.6/10
Jeuxvideo.com	14/20
MeriStation	7.8/10
PlayStation Official Magazine – UK	6/10
Play	65%
PlayStation: The Official Magazine	7/10
Push Square	8/10
Common Sense Media	4/5
National Post	7/10

The game received "average" reviews according to the review aggregation website Metacritic. In Japan, where the game was released on November 29, 2012, Famitsu gave it a score of one seven, one six, one five, and one six for a total of 24 out of 40.

Chad Sapieha of Common Sense Media gave the game four stars out of five, saying, "If the sequel adds a bit of panache while maintaining spot-on controls, Sony may have the motion-controlled sports compilation game to beat." However, in National Post he gave it seven out of ten, saying, "Like its predecessor, Sports Champions 2 is a showcase for PlayStation Move technology. But without a style to call its own, it's not likely to leave a lasting impression." Metro gave it five out of ten, calling it "A wasted opportunity to redeem PlayStation Move, with a horribly uninspired range of sports that barely work any better than back when they were Wii Sports games."

== See also ==
- Wii Sports
- Wii Sports Resort
- Kinect Sports
- Sports Champions
