= Mii =

Avatar on several Nintendo video game consoles and mobile apps

- Male and female body styles used for the default Miis since the Wii
- Developer: Nintendo
- Release: November 19, 2006: Wii; NA: November 19, 2006; JP: December 2, 2006; AU: December 7, 2006; EU: December 8, 2006 Nintendo 3DS; JP: February 26, 2011; EU: March 25, 2011; NA: March 27, 2011; AU: March 31, 2011 Wii U; NA: November 18, 2012; PAL: November 30, 2012; JP: December 8, 2012 Nintendo Switch; WW: March 3, 2017 Nintendo Switch 2; WW: June 5, 2025
- Platform: Wii; Nintendo DS; Nintendo 3DS; Wii U; Nintendo Switch; Nintendo Switch 2
- Type: Avatar

A Mii (Note: Japanese: ミー, Hepburn: Mī; Nintendo branded the avatar in Japan in its English name) (/miː/ MEE) is a customizable avatar used by Nintendo on their Wii, Wii U, Nintendo Switch, and Nintendo Switch 2 video game consoles and mobile apps, including the Nintendo DS and Nintendo 3DS handhelds. The name is a portmanteau of "Wii" and "me", referring to them typically being avatars of the players.

Miis originally debuted on the Wii in 2006, and then later appeared on the Nintendo DS in 2008, the Nintendo 3DS in 2011, the Wii U in 2012, the Nintendo Switch in 2017 and the Nintendo Switch 2 in 2025, as well as various apps for smart devices such as the now-defunct Miitomo in 2016. They competed primarily with Microsoft's Xbox Avatars.

== Overview ==
Miis can be created using different body, facial and clothing features, and can then be used as characters within games on the consoles, either as an avatar of a specific player (such as in the Wii series) or in some games (such as Tomodachi Collection, Tomodachi Life and Miitopia) portrayed as characters with their own personalities. Miis can be shared and transferred between consoles, either manually or automatically with other users over the internet and local wireless communications.

On the 3DS and Wii U, user accounts are associated with a Mii as their avatar and are used as the basis of the systems' social networking features, most prominently the now-defunct Miiverse. On the Nintendo Switch and Nintendo Switch 2, Miis can still be selected as an account's avatar, however other avatars featuring various Nintendo characters are also available. Miis are also used as profile pictures for Nintendo Accounts and can be used in Nintendo smart device games such as Super Mario Run, Miitomo and Mario Kart Tour.

Games such as Wii Sports, Wii Sports Resort, Wii Sports Club, Nintendo Switch Sports, Nintendo Switch Sports Resort, Mario Kart Wii, Mario Kart 8, Go Vacation, Super Mario Maker 2, Super Smash Bros. for Nintendo 3DS and Wii U, Super Smash Bros. Ultimate and New Super Mario Bros. U Deluxe use Miis as playable characters.

== History ==
Nintendo's idea of a free-form personal avatar software was discussed at the Game Developers Conference in 2007, a year after the release of the Wii. There, Shigeru Miyamoto said that the personal avatar concept had originally been intended as a demo for the Family Computer Disk System, where a user could draw a face onto an avatar. Miyamoto commented that the concept could not be turned into a game and was discarded.

Released in 2000, Mario Artist: Talent Studio for the Japan-only 64DD expansion unit for the Nintendo 64 had an avatar maker that includes clothes and a built-in movie editor; the player can optionally utilize the Game Boy Camera and the 64DD's Capture Cassette to put their own face upon the avatar. Nintendo produced a short film using the game's avatar maker to demonstrate its capabilities. Talent Studio was one of Nintendo's first public debut of avatar creation. Nintendo designer Yamashita Takayuki attributes his work on Talent Studio as having been foundational to his eventual work on the Mii, which was necessitated by the development of the game Wii Sports.

The next avatar implementation was for the Nintendo e-Reader and GameCube. Along with the Game Boy Camera, it also includes an avatar maker. Miyamoto previewed the software at E3 2002 under the name Stage Debut, with a short film that demonstrated the software's capabilities. This software, later renamed to Manebito, was discontinued prior to release.

Another attempt at an avatar implementation came about in the mid-2000s during the development of a Nintendo DS game that was conceived as a women's fortune-telling game that was inspired by the 2000 Hamtaro video game Tottoko Hamtaro: Tomodachi Daisakusen Dechu for the Game Boy Color. The game, which was being worked on by Yoshio Sakamoto and Nintendo SPD, featured an avatar maker that functioned similarly to the Wii's avatar creator that would later become the Mii Channel; the avatars featured in the game laid the foundation of the Mii with interchangeable facial features and adjustable body height and weight.

As the game was being worked on around the time the Wii was being developed, the avatar concept from that game was adopted for the Wii which led to the development of the Mii. The Mii avatars retained some aspects of the avatars found in the game including the use of interchangeable facial features and adjustable body height and weight, but also adding options such as selecting a favorite color, gender types, additional options for hair, eyes, nose, mouth and head shape, and several other features. Meanwhile, the game itself was reworked as Tomodachi Collection for the Nintendo DS.

During a Financial Results Briefing Q&A with investors in 2008, Satoru Iwata mentioned that the licensed use of the Mii trademark is as valuable to Miyamoto as that of the Mario brand, implying that the company would only narrowly consider any offers from game developers to implement Miis in their games.

== Mii creation ==
The Mii Channel, the first application used to create and view Mii characters on the Wii

Mii characters are created and stored in the Mii Channel or the Mii Maker, which are pre-installed on the Wii and the Nintendo 3DS/Wii U consoles respectively, as well as the Mii creator software located in System Settings for the Nintendo Switch and Nintendo Switch 2. While the user can assign a gender, (Note: Referred to as Mii styles (representing the two gender types) since the Nintendo Switch 2) name, birthday, favorite color, and mingle preference to a Mii, the majority of the interface used for Mii creation focuses on the appearance of its face and head: the user is given a variety of different hairstyles, eye, nose, and mouth shapes, and other features such as facial hair or wrinkles, to select from. Most of the facial features can be further adjusted, including their size, position, color, and alignment. Accessories such as hats and glasses are also available to add, and the Mii's height and build can also be adjusted. The Mii Maker installed on the Nintendo 3DS and Wii U can use facial recognition to generate a Mii, which selects facial features based on a photograph of a person's face taken with the system's and GamePad's cameras respectively. The features can then be fine-tuned by the user. These versions also have more options than their Wii counterpart. Because the selection of facial features is considered by some to be limited, users are encouraged to develop caricatures of real people instead of accurate depictions.

=== Additional options in games ===
Certain games have also added additional features in their Mii makers that are otherwise made as part of the game or as secondary features, allowing for more customization options than the standard Mii maker software can provide.

==== Tomodachi series ====
The Tomodachi Life games (including Miitomo) has options to input a first and last name for the Mii in addition to the Mii's given name (referred to in-game as a "nickname"), as well as the ability to customize the Mii's voice and personality. In the Japanese and Korean versions only, it has additional options for choosing a blood type for the Mii based on the blood type personality theory. Tomodachi Life: Living the Dream adds a "Face Paint" feature that allows for drawing and adding shapes on a Mii's face, allowing for the creation of more sophisticated Mii characters; the game also has more options than the system's Mii Maker can provide. Miis created in the Tomodachi series games (apart from Miitomo and Tomodachi Life: Living the Dream) can be transferred over to the system's Mii Maker, and Miis created via the Mii Maker can also be transferred into the games themselves.

==== Miitopia ====
Miitopia added additional hair and eye color options for the Mii, which were later adapted for the Switch and Switch 2's Mii creation software. The Switch version of Miitopia added the option of wigs and even makeup customization options that could be applied onto an existing Mii, allowing for the creation of more sophisticated looking Mii characters. Miis created in the Switch version of Miitopia can be shared online via "access keys", which allows users to use Miis created by others in-game with one's own Miitopia save data. This feature is only usable with an active Nintendo Switch Online subscription.

Miis can be transferred from the system's Mii creation software (Mii Maker in the original game and the Switch's Mii creator in the remaster) to the game itself, which can be used as playable characters, non-playable characters and even as background characters. Miis created in both the original and remastered versions of Miitopia can also be transferred from the game into the system's Mii creation software, however wigs and makeups (as well as additional hair and eye color options in the original game) will not carry over.

=== Special Miis ===
Nintendo periodically released special Miis, usually during E3 or to commemorate game and franchise anniversaries. Their Miis feature gold pants, as opposed to a gray pair, and cannot be edited or copied. If owners transfer them to another console, e.g. to another Wii, 3DS, or Wii Remote, they will be removed from their original location, instead of traditionally making another copy.

For a limited time between March 13 and 30, 2007, Wii owners in Japan were sent Mii versions of comedian Sanma Akashiya and tennis player Shuzo Matsuoka. The duo had been featured in Japanese promotions for the Wii, highlighting Miis themselves. Miis of Satoru Iwata and Reggie Fils-Aimé (the presidents of Nintendo and Nintendo of America, respectively) were released on the 3DS for the 1st anniversary of the handheld console. During 2013, Nintendo released special Miis of Shigeru Miyamoto and Kensuke Tanabe, and during E3 2013, also released special Miis for Takashi Tezuka, Koichi Hayashida, Eiji Aonuma, and Hideki Konno.

The Nintendo 3DS application Swapnote (known as Itsu no Ma ni Kōkan Nikki (いつの間に交換日記, Suddenly Exchange Diary) in Japan and as Nintendo Letter Box in other regions) features an original character named Nikki (ニッキー) who serves as a guide for the application; she appears as a uniquely styled female Mii in the software as well as an artwork version of her character in most appearances. Since her introduction, Nikki has gained a relatively small fan base of her own right, especially in Japan. Nikki then went on to appear in a few other Nintendo games and apps, such as Nikki no Tabisuru Quiz (ニッキーの旅するクイズ, Nikki's Travel Quiz), a 2015 Nintendo 3DS travel guide app that was exclusively distributed via the now-defunct Club Nintendo in Japan, Nintendo Badge Arcade for the Nintendo 3DS, Swapdoodle (known as Irasuto Kōkan Nikki (イラスト交換日記, Illustrated Exchange Diary) in Japan), the successor to Swapnote/Nintendo Letter Box for the Nintendo 3DS, and in Super Smash Bros. Ultimate as an Assist Trophy.

== Wii ==
=== Mii Channel ===
The Mii Channel (Note: Known in Japan as the Nigaoe Channel (似顔絵チャンネル, Nigaoe Chan'neru)) is the app that allows Mii creation on the Wii menu. It can store up to 100 Miis, and Wii Remotes are also able to store and transfer up to ten Miis to other consoles. It is also possible to see other Miis from TV shows and games.

=== Uses in games ===
Miis are intended to be an extension of the player, and in keeping with this spirit, the user can use them in several Nintendo titles for the Wii. Wii Sports is perhaps the best-known example of this, and it adds a further personal touch to Miis by saving game statistics and records for individual Miis. Miis will make cameo appearances as computer-controlled opponents, teammates, or within the audience. Miis have been used to serve as game file icons (profiles) within several games. Often appearing as just a head for identification, this Mii has no impact on the actual gameplay other than to identify a player in another way besides the name, or representation based on looks.

Miis are primarily used in games such as Wii Sports, Wii Play, Wii Fit, Wii Party, Wii Fit Plus, Wii Music and Wii Sports Resort. Players can also use their Miis, however, in other first-party games, most noticeably within WarioWare: Smooth Moves, Mario & Sonic at the Olympic Games, Mario Party 8, Mario Kart Wii, Mario Super Sluggers, Animal Crossing: City Folk (using their Mii's head as a mask) and in Go Vacation. The Japan-only Sega game Jissen Pachi-Slot Pachinko Hisshôhô! Hokuto no Ken Wii is the first third-party game to incorporate Miis, while the Wii version of FIFA Soccer 08 is the first third-party game released in North America, Europe and Australia to use the Mii Channel. Many other games, like We Ski, and Guitar Hero World Tour and Sonic Colors also use Miis.

While a Mii's head always remains the same, its body varies between games. For example, in Wii Sports, the Mii's body is stylized, with spherical floating hands and bearing no arms, and Mii audiences or CPUs floating with spherical bottoms with no legs instead, but in Wii Fit its body is designed to look more natural, and its weight will be determined by the weight Wii Fit found of the player in Wii Fit tests. Sometimes Miis will wear outfits in context with the game. In Super Mario Galaxy and its sequel, the Miis can be optionally used for the planet's icon that represents the save file, the other option being to use Mario characters for the planets. Only the Mii's head is shown and it's shown in a sphere shaped like the planet. In Mario Kart Wii, Mii racers can be dressed in jumpsuits, or Mario style overalls for males and a Peach style dress for females, in Dr. Mario Online Rx, Miis appear in medical clothing, and in Metroid Prime 3: Corruption, where they appear as bobblehead dolls, they will be dressed up in bounty hunter Samus Aran's Power Suit. In MLB Power Pros, Miis are designed to look like regular Power Pro-Kun avatar, with legs detached from the main body. In Dance Dance Revolution Hottest Party 2, the Mii's body is formed more like a regular human. This design was, however, criticized by IGN's Lucas M. Thomas, who sarcastically commented that "[it] doesn't look disturbing at all."

While Miis are not playable in Super Smash Bros. Brawl, the creator of the series, Masahiro Sakurai, explained that Miis were originally considered to be playable in the game, but the idea was decided against due to fears of bullying. They would eventually debut in Super Smash Bros. for Nintendo 3DS and Wii U.

=== Everybody Votes Channel ===
Miis were incorporated in the downloadable Everybody Votes Channel, where Miis represented the voter. Up to six different Miis could be registered within the channel to use in voting. The channel was discontinued along with the Check Mii Out channel by Nintendo on June 28, 2013, as they moved on to other next-generation projects.

=== Check Mii Out Channel ===
Another Mii-centric channel, the Check Mii Out Channel, also known as the Mii Contest Channel (Miiコンテストチャンネル, Mī Kontesuto Channeru) in Japan, Europe, and Oceania, was released on November 11, 2007. Perhaps an evolution of an idea shared by Shigeru Miyamoto at the Game Developers Conference in 2007, this channel allowed players to upload their Mii characters and share them with other users. There were also popularity contests, in which players would design a Mii that would personify a specific idea or character and then vote on the Mii that would best fit the suggestion. The channel was available for free download on the Wii Shop Channel from November 12, 2007, until June 27, 2013, when Nintendo discontinued the channel along with the Everybody Votes channel.

== Nintendo DS ==
Although the platform lacks native support for Mii creation, a few games on the Nintendo DS console do support Mii functionality, and will work in conjunction with the Wii's Mii Channel.

=== Uses in games ===
Miis can be transferred from a user's Wii to supported Nintendo DS games via the Mii Channel. A code must be entered by the user to unlock the feature on the Mii Channel.

The Nintendo DS game Personal Trainer: Walking uses Miis to allow players to track their progress in the game. Players are also able to create Miis in-game. The Nintendo DS version of Final Fantasy Crystal Chronicles: Echoes of Time also uses Miis.

The life-simulation game Tomodachi Collection, only released in Japan for the Nintendo DS, also uses Miis and has a built-in Mii editor. Miis from the user's Wii's Mii Channel can be transferred to the game, and vice versa.

== Nintendo 3DS ==
=== Mii Maker ===
The Mii Maker (Miiスタジオ, Mī Sutajio; lit. "Mii Studio") is the app that allows Mii creation on the Nintendo 3DS. It can store up to 100 Mii characters, much like the Wii, and includes more facial features than the latter. The Mii Maker installed on the Nintendo 3DS can use facial recognition to generate a Mii, which selects facial features based on a photograph of a person's face taken with the system's cameras.

=== Uses in games ===
Unlike the Nintendo DS, which features limited support of Mii characters, its successor the Nintendo 3DS features Miis as a standard. Similar to the Wii's Mii Channel, the Nintendo 3DS features its own Mii-creating application called Mii Maker, which is more advanced than the Mii Channel.

Mii characters can be created manually with Mii Maker as on the Wii's Mii Channel, but they can also be created automatically through the use of the Nintendo 3DS's cameras. The system captures an image of a subject's face, and the application converts the image into a Mii likeness using integrated recognition software. Automated Mii character designs can be manually adjusted. Mii characters can also be imported from the Wii to the 3DS or from the 3DS to the Wii U, however, Miis cannot be sent from the 3DS to the Wii, as Mii Maker features an expanded selection of design parts that are not available on Mii Channel.

The Nintendo 3DS can generate and read QR codes that represent Mii characters. QR codes and pictures of Mii characters can also be transferred to an SD card in any picture format, and be used in various ways, such as posting them on a web page. Miis on the Nintendo 3DS can also be used in conjunction with the device's built-in augmented reality software – the software includes a mini-app named 'Mii Pics' which allows the user to take a photo of their Mii within a regular photo, using an augmented reality card included with the system.

The first Nintendo 3DS game to include support for Mii characters is Pilotwings Resort. Miis obtained through StreetPass appear as non-player characters in Nintendogs + Cats. Mii characters also appear in Pokémon Rumble Blast, Mario Kart 7, and many more games. Dillon's Dead-Heat Breakers (released as a Nintendo eShop exclusive in North America) also uses Miis in-game as "Amiimals", an anthropomorphic animal with facial features based on a Mii.

Currently, the most notable games to feature Miis in their entirety are Tomodachi Life, the sequel to the Japan-only Tomodachi Collection for the Nintendo DS, and Miitopia. Tomodachi Life is also the first game to give Miis complete lines of dialogue as well as the first game to allow players to choose what Miis say.

=== StreetPass Mii Plaza ===
A feature on the Nintendo 3DS, the StreetPass Mii Plaza (すれちがいMii広場, Surechigai Mī Hiroba) makes use of the handheld's StreetPass feature, which data can be transferred between nearby Nintendo 3DS consoles in standby mode. As Miis are gathered in the plaza, they can be used in numerous minigames, with the initial two being Puzzle Swap and Find Mii (known as StreetPass Quest in PAL regions). In Puzzle Swap, players can exchange pieces of several jigsaw puzzle panels based on Nintendo games, in which there were initially seven, but this number increased with occasional updates. Find Mii is an RPG minigame in which players use the Miis they gathered to fight through dungeons, earning accessories for their Mii. Each Mii possesses a different type of magic depending on their color, and become more powerful if the player meets them more than once. These games can be optionally played with Play Coins, though the results are more random than with Streetpass Miis. On December 6, 2011, the feature was updated to include SpotPass functionality, as well as new puzzle panels, a sequel to Find Mii, a map showing where players met other Miis, Accomplishments and a music player.

Special Miis released by Nintendo and obtained through SpotPass can also be used in StreetPass Mii Plaza. They have access to all Puzzle Swap pieces and provide a level 5 player for Find Mii.

== Wii U ==
=== Mii Maker ===
Screenshot of Mii Maker's creation tool on the Wii U, as shown on the console's GamePad

The Mii Maker (Miiスタジオ, Mī Sutajio; lit. "Mii Studio") is the app that allows Mii creation on the Wii U. It can store up to 3,000 Miis and includes the same facial features used on the Nintendo 3DS. The Mii Maker installed on the Wii U can use facial recognition to generate a Mii, which selects the features based on a photo of a face taken with the Wii U GamePad camera.

=== Uses in games ===
Mii characters evolve further for the Wii's successor, Wii U. In addition to previous uses on the Wii, Mii characters are wholly integrated into the Wii U's social online network Miiverse, the WaraWara Plaza community where clusters of Mii characters crowd around the hottest games, and being depicted as personal avatars for individual Wii U players, who have the ability for twelve separate Nintendo Network ID User accounts that can be used on a single console at a time. User accounts with Mii representatives are used for both games and apps such as Nintendo TVii. Mii characters can be transferred from the Wii and/or the Nintendo 3DS to the Wii U, in which in the latter's case transfers between consoles can occur as many times as possible.

Mii characters also return as in-game characters for certain Wii U games, which in addition to Nintendo-published titles such as Wii Sports Club, Super Smash Bros. for Wii U, Mario Kart 8, (Note: Mario Kart 8 allowed for new racing suits to be acquired for Miis by tapping a compatible amiibo figure via the Gamepad's NFC reader.) New Super Mario Bros. U and Nintendo Land, they are also included in third-party titles such as Sonic & All-Stars Racing Transformed.

The Legend of Zelda: Breath of the Wild uses an evolved form of Mii, UMii, to render non-essential NPCs.

== Nintendo Switch and Nintendo Switch 2 ==
=== Mii creation ===
Screenshot of the Mii creation software on the Nintendo Switch

Unlike previous Nintendo consoles and handhelds, the Nintendo Switch and Nintendo Switch 2's Mii creator software is located within the console's system settings menu instead of it being a separate app. It can store up to 100 Miis, similar to the Wii and Nintendo 3DS, and includes the same facial features used on the 3DS and Wii U while also providing additional options as well as unnatural hair and eye colors.

=== Uses in games ===
On the Switch and Switch 2, Miis can be used to represent accounts on the console; users may optionally use a Nintendo character such as Mario as their avatar instead.

On the Switch 2, Miis are not defined by a specific gender; instead, the Switch 2's Mii creation software uses two different Mii styles resembling the two formerly defined gender types, which can be defined as genders in certain games. A later software update for the Switch 2 added the ability to play music from previous Mii creation softwares such as the 3DS and Wii U's Mii Maker and the Wii's Mii Channel on the Switch 2's Mii creator software, as well as the ability to generate QR codes representing Miis similar to the 3DS and Wii U, which can be read via the use of an external camera accessory.

Miis can be transferred between Switch consoles and imported from a 3DS or Wii U using an amiibo figure; the Switch 2 can also generate and read QR codes representing Miis created on the 3DS, Wii U, or Switch 2 in a later software update, which requires the use of a external camera accessory. Miis can also be imported from a Nintendo Account.

Miis can still be integrated into games as a playable character such as Mario Kart 8 Deluxe, (Note: Mario Kart 8 Deluxe allowed for new racing suits for Miis to be acquired by tapping a compatible amiibo figure onto the Joy-Con or the Nintendo Switch Pro Controller's NFC reader, similar to the original Wii U version.) Go Vacation, Nintendo Switch Sports, Super Smash Bros. Ultimate and New Super Mario Bros. U Deluxe. Nintendo Switch Sports introduced an entirely different set of avatars known as "Sportsmates", however Miis can still be selected as an option; its sequel Nintendo Switch Sports Resort for the Switch 2 retains the usage of Sportsmates as well as the option to use Miis but includes a slider to determine the number of Sportsmates visible with the option to replace them with Miis.

Currently, the most notable games on the Switch to feature Miis in their entirety are the Switch version of Miitopia and Tomodachi Life: Living the Dream, the sequel to Tomodachi Life for the 3DS.

== Other platforms ==
When the freemium mobile app Miitomo launched on iOS and Android devices in 2016, it was possible for the first time to officially create Mii characters without the need for a Nintendo console. Mii characters created on the app initially resembled their Wii U counterparts, and used the same attributes. Later versions of the app updated the Mii characters to be more inline with that of the Nintendo Switch, even using the same attributes. Nintendo Account holders can opt to use the app to create Mii avatars without the need to link their accounts to any Nintendo console, with the option also available. Miitomo was also used to support Mii avatars on other Nintendo apps for smart devices. For example, in an update released for Super Mario Run on April 25, 2017, player Mii icon customization options became available with the support of Miitomo and its in-game costumes via the same Nintendo Account. Miitomo was only available in 60 of the 165 countries/territories recognized by Nintendo Accounts when it was discontinued on May 9, 2018.

A few weeks after Miitomo was discontinued, Nintendo introduced a browser-based Mii editor called Mii Studio on May 24, 2018. The editor is integrated into all Nintendo Accounts for users in all regions, including regions that originally did not have official support for Miitomo. Mii Studio supports all Mii attributes and standards introduced for the Nintendo Switch. Up to six Mii avatars can be created at a time, including any Mii imported from a linked Nintendo Network ID (also known as NNID).

== Other appearances ==
Outside of games, Miis have been featured in various types of media, including in several promotional and marketing materials by Nintendo.

In 2009, the Japanese Police created a wanted poster for a hit and run suspect in Kanagawa Prefecture, using the Mii character creator to make a facial composite of the criminal. This received a Guinness World Record for the "first use of Nintendo for criminal investigation".

Miis made an appearance in Mario Kart: Bowser's Challenge at the Super Nintendo World amusement areas in Universal Studios Japan, Universal Studios Hollywood and Universal Epic Universe during the pre-show sections to showcase ride mechanics and safety precautions. (Note: The Miis featured in Mario Kart: Bowser's Challenge were taken from a selection of CPU Miis found in the Wii U era, which were previously used in titles such as Nintendo Land, Wii Sports Club and Wii Party U, and then subsequently used in several Nintendo promotional and marketing materials since.)

Miis were referenced in The Super Mario Bros. Movie where it briefly appears as a "no contact" icon on Luigi's smartphone when he receives an incoming call from earlier on in the movie, using a silhouetted image of a default Mii in the male body style.

== See also ==
- List of video games featuring Miis
- Xbox Avatars
- PlayStation Home, which also featured avatar creation
