= NSSR =

NSSR may refer to:

- The New School for Social Research
- North Shore Scenic Railroad, a heritage railway between Duluth and Two Harbors, Minnesota, USA
- Norwegian Society for Sea Rescue
- Nintendo Switch Sports Resort, a 2026 video game
