= Nintendo Switch Sports =

2022 video game

- Box art depicting the game avatars playing three of the available sports: badminton (top), volleyball (middle), and football (soccer) (bottom)
- Developer: Nintendo EPD (Note: Additional development support by Eighting and Access Games)
- Publisher: Nintendo
- Director: Yoshikazu Yamashita
- Producers: Kouichi Kawamoto; Takayuki Shimamura
- Designers: Hirotake Otsubo; Yoji Kamikawa; Koji Kitagawa; Kazuhiro Yoshikawa; Atsuto Yagi; Ryosuke Suzuki; Sota Omiya; Ikki Niwa
- Programmers: Yuki Onozawa; Hideyuki Tatsuta; Kenji Iwata
- Artists: Junji Morii; Gurihiru
- Composers: Haruko Torii; Takuhiro Honda
- Series: Wii
- Platform: Nintendo Switch
- Release: April 29, 2022
- Genre: Sports
- Modes: Single-player, multiplayer

Nintendo Switch Sports (Note: Japanese: ニンテンドースイッチスポーツ, Hepburn: Nintendō Suitchi Supōtsu) is a 2022 sports simulation video game developed and published by Nintendo for the Nintendo Switch. It is the sequel to Wii Sports Club (2014) as part of the Wii Sports subseries, which is itself of the Wii series of games. The game features eight sports: volleyball, badminton, ten-pin bowling, golf, football (soccer), chambara, tennis, and basketball, which are played in a similar manner as other Wii Sports games. Multiplayer is included, supporting up to 4 players locally, and 2 players in online play with random matchmaking on the Internet.

Development started shortly after the Nintendo Switch was released, when the director Yoshikazu Yamashita and his development team were asked to create a Wii Sports title for the Nintendo Switch. Most team members were newcomers to the series who had not worked on past Wii titles. The game was promoted prior to release with an online playtest in early 2022.

Nintendo Switch Sports was released worldwide on April 29, 2022. It received mixed reviews from critics, with reviewers divided over the enjoyability of each sport. It was a commercial success and sold over 18.32 million copies by March 2026, making it one of the best-selling Nintendo Switch games. A sequel, Nintendo Switch Sports Resort, was released for the Nintendo Switch 2 on October 22, 2026.

== Gameplay ==
A player aiming the ball in a "special" round of the game's online Survival Bowling mode

Nintendo Switch Sports is set in a fictional multisport facility named Spocco Square, which contains three sports from previous installments (tennis and bowling from Wii Sports and swordplay from Wii Sports Resort; the latter is referred to as chambara within the game) and three new sports (football, volleyball, and badminton). Another sport from Wii Sports, golf, was announced and issued in a free update on November 29, 2022. As part of the June 2024 Nintendo Direct, Nintendo announced the addition of basketball (previously featured in Wii Sports Resort), which was released as a free update on July 10.

Players utilize the Nintendo Switch's Joy-Con in a similar manner to the other Wii Sports games, positioning them in a manner resembling the actual sport. The gyroscope functionality embedded within the Joy-Con is used to simulate motion in-game, compared to the usage of the Wii Remote (and occasionally the Nunchuk) to simulate motion in the other games in the series.

Alongside Miis, new avatars called "Sportsmates" have been introduced, which have more detailed hair and faces as well as arms and legs. Additionally, the Leg Strap accessory introduced in Ring Fit Adventure is included in the physical copy of the game and is usable in Football. At launch, the leg strap only worked for Football Shootout Mode. As of the Summer update launched in July 2022, the leg strap can now be used for all Football match types.

The game has multiplayer available both locally on the same system and online. Local matchmaking allows up to four local players to participate in games together in a similar manner to previous entries in the series. Online allows up to two local players to play with friends and participate in random matchmaking over the Internet.

== Development ==
The game was announced in a Nintendo Direct presentation on February 9, 2022, with a release date of April 29, 2022. A free-to-play online playtest of the game to test functionality and stability was available for registration on February 15, 2022, for those with a Nintendo Switch Online subscription. The playtest was available to play during specific times on February 18 to 20, 2022.

Takayuki Shimamura, who directed all the Wii Sports series, returned to this title as producer, and Yoshikazu Yamashita, who directed Wii Sports and Wii Sports Resort, returned as director. The project started a while after the Nintendo Switch system was released. Yoshiaki Koizumi, Senior Executive Officer, Deputy General Manager of Nintendo EPD, and general producer of the Nintendo Switch, called Yamashita and requested the development of a Nintendo Switch title in the Wii Sports series. According to Yamashita, 90% of the members of the development team were new members who weren't part of the past Wii series titles.

Development of post-release content faced some setbacks. In September 2022, Nintendo announced that the golf game mode, which was previously targeted for release that month, would be delayed to November. In October 2022, an update intended to address cheating in online play was released with a bug that caused the game to crash in both online and offline modes, forcing Nintendo to stop distributing the update and take the game's servers offline until a solution could be found.

== Reception ==
Reception

Aggregate scores
Aggregator	Score
Metacritic	72/100
OpenCritic	44% recommend

Review scores
Publication	Score
Destructoid	7/10
Game Informer	7.5/10
GameSpot	7/10
GamesRadar+	4/5
IGN	7/10
Nintendo Life	6/10
Nintendo World Report	8/10
PCMag	3.5/5
Shacknews	8/10
The Guardian	4/5

According to review aggregator website Metacritic, the game received "mixed or average" reviews from critics upon release. OpenCritic determined that 44% of critics recommend the game.

The sports received varied opinions. Football was reviewed as one of the worst sports in the game, though Shoot-Out mode was considered better. Destructoid reviewed it as "arguably one of the weaker Nintendo Switch Sports experiences available," Volleyball was also reviewed as one of the weakest sports in the game. GameSpot reviewed Volleyball as the least intuitive to "pick up and play" as it required learning a series of movesets, as opposed to the simplicity of the other sports in the game. Bowling was reviewed as a very fun sport to play online and as a very intuitive sport for everyone to "pick up and play."

Badminton was reviewed as a very fun sport. GamesRadar+ even reviewed it as "just as fun as football," although the game doesn't tell you how to make more powerful shots, so there is a learning curve based on trial and error. Chambara was reviewed as an odd sport, but its nuance makes it interesting, and it was not bad. Tennis was reviewed as an impressively polished sport, and the addition of powerful slams and obstacle courses added a challenge to the sport.

Reviewers praised that online play does not strictly require a Nintendo Switch Online subscription, but stated that the online play had untapped potential. Others did not care about the customization options. Others enjoyed the online mode, the feature that progression was locked behind online was considered "a bummer" and an issue for some players by reviewers.

=== Sales ===
The game sold nearly 190,000 copies in its first week in Japan, topping the weekly sales charts. Similarly, the game topped the weekly sales charts in the UK, South Korea and Taiwan. In the United States, it charted at number 5 for the month of April based on physical sales alone, becoming the second best-selling new release of the month, behind Lego Star Wars: The Skywalker Saga. It became the 19th best-selling game of 2022 in the US.

Nintendo Switch Sports has sold over 16.27 million copies as of March 31, 2025.

It was nominated for the British Academy Games Award for Family at the 19th British Academy Games Awards and Best Family Game at The Game Awards 2022.
