= Sports Champions =

2010 video game

- North American cover art
- Developers: San Diego Studio; Zindagi Games
- Publisher: Sony Computer Entertainment
- Designers: Sean Levantino; Greg Wondra
- Platform: PlayStation 3
- Release: EU: September 15, 2010; AU: September 16, 2010; NA/UK: September 17, 2010
- Genre: Sports
- Modes: Single-player, Multiplayer

Sports Champions is a 2010 sports video game developed by San Diego Studio and Zindagi Games and published by Sony Computer Entertainment for the PlayStation 3. It utilizes the PlayStation Move controller. The game is a collection of modern and medieval sports minigames. It was officially unveiled at the 2010 Game Developers Conference in San Francisco as a launch game for the PlayStation Move which would be bundled with the controller in several regions.

== Gameplay ==
Gameplay of the Gladiator Duel event of the game

The game involves the player taking part in six unique sports games. However unlike Wii Sports, a similar collection of sports games for the Wii, the game consists of a series of modern as well as medieval sports. The game deviates from the norm by including uncommon sports such as Disc Golf and Bocce.

Unlike Wii Sports, Wii Sports Resort and Kinect Sports, players can't make their own avatar. Players can choose to participate as one of ten athletes in the various events. The game features three gameplay modes, Free Play, Challenge Mode and Champion Cup mode. In Free Play mode, players can play practice matches with their choice of gameplay options. Challenge mode allows players to compete in a series of events to increase their high scores. In Champion Cup mode, players compete against ten other athletes in an Olympic-like event to become the ultimate champion. Players can also take part in the various modes along with up to three other friends in the game's multiplayer mode.

=== Sports ===
- Table tennis

In Table Tennis, players use a Move controller accurately as a paddle which allows players to volley very precisely, perform heavy spins, lobs and slams. The PlayStation Eye also monitors the player's body location to see how the player is positioned to adjust their character's orientation as well as position from the table. The precision of the Move also allows players to serve slices and spins accurately.

- Beach Volleyball

With this sport, the player has no direct control over where the on screen character starts the match or stands. Instead of focusing on the placement of the character, the player is meant to concentrate on bumping, setting and spiking the ball. All of these three motions are not complicated, but the key to playing this game is timing. A coloured circle appears around the ball when it is coming to the player, and the size and colour of it lets the player know when it is best to make a motion and deliver a strike. This game is playable with both one or two Move controllers. It has Tatupu's beach volleyball medal gold, silver and bronze.

- Gladiator Duel

This sport allows players to use one or two Move controllers. When using two controllers, one controls a weapon such as a giant Mallet, or various swords like a short sword, or a katana and the other controls a Buckler which resembles a shield that becomes smaller when the opponent hits it. When using one controller the T button is used to present the buckler. Players can fill up a power meter to unleash a three-hit combo on their opponent. Other controls include players putting their hands on their hips to taunt the enemy as well as holding down the trigger and swinging the controller up to jump. The game will feature a wide array of enemies as well as a large assortment of unlockable weapons including some unusually strange weapons.

- Disc golf

In this game the player's objective is to throw a Frisbee down a golf-like course and try to get their Frisbee into the bucket before the opponent does. The Move detects the angle of the Frisbee, the power of the throw and the snap of the release, making it a very realistic experience.

- Bocce

In Bocce, two people take turns throwing wooden balls at a similar looking, albeit smaller wooden ball located down the field from the players. The person who gets their ball(s) closer to the smaller ball wins the point (or, if they have multiple balls that are the closest to the smaller ball, they can win multiple points). The player can also hit an opponent's ball so it rolls in any given direction, either further away or closer to the target ball. The Move detects the weight, spin and release of each throw, and then translates that into the direction and movement of the ball.

- Archery

This is another sport in the game that allows a player to use either one or two Move controllers. When using two, the player hold one Move controller as if it were a bow, and the other as if it were an arrow. The player must reach back behind them and press and hold the T button to pull an arrow out of their quiver, nock the arrow by putting the two Move controllers next to each other, pull back with the Move that is controlling the arrow, and finally once the player has the desired tension, they must release the T button to fire the arrow. Depending on how far back you pull the arrow; the further it goes. When using one controller you reach back the same way, but to knock you simply point the Move controller straight out towards the screen.

== Sequel ==
Sports Champions 2 was announced on May 31, 2012 on PlayStation Blog by a trailer. The trailer included skiing, boxing and many more sports for the user to play.

== Reception ==
Reception

Aggregate score
Aggregator	Score
Metacritic	76/100

Review scores
Publication	Score
Edge	6/10
Eurogamer	7/10
Famitsu	31/40
Game Informer	7.75/10
GameRevolution	B
GameSpot	7.5/10
GameTrailers	6.8/10
GameZone	7.5/10
Giant Bomb	4/5 stars
IGN	7.5/10
Joystiq	4/5 stars
PlayStation: The Official Magazine	8/10
Push Square	7/10 stars
The Telegraph	7/10
Metro	7/10

The game received "generally favorable reviews" according to the review aggregation website Metacritic. In Japan, where the game was ported for release on October 21, 2010, Famitsu gave it a score of 31 out of 40.

Joystiq said: "Sports Champions is a great pack-in for Move and well worth buying on its own if you go the a la carte route with the hardware." Game Informer said: "Despite some missteps, Sports Champions is a solid offering for gamers, provided you can accept the shallow nature of a compilation such as this." IGN said: "Sports Champions is fun, but it's rough around the edges. The gameplay is solid for the most part and will provide you with some good times." GameSpot said: "Sports Champions is undoubtedly one of the strongest launch offerings for the PlayStation Move hardware. This isn't a game that you're likely to play solo for any serious amount of time, but it's certainly one that you'll keep coming back to in short bursts and anytime you have interested friends or relatives visiting."

== See also ==
- Wii Sports
- Wii Sports Resort
- Kinect Sports
- Sports Champions 2
