= Wii Party U =

2013 video game

- Developers: NDcube; Nintendo SPD Production Group No. 4
- Publisher: Nintendo
- Director: Shuichiro Nishiya
- Producers: Hiroshi Sato; Atsushi Ikeda
- Programmers: Masayuki Shinohara; Yuhei Tsukami; Akira Matsumoto; Kenji Oohira; Haruhiko Tanuma
- Artists: Norio Asakura; Kunihiro Hasuoka; Ryo Koizumi
- Composers: Ichiro Shimakura; Toshiki Aida; Ryosuke Asami
- Series: Wii
- Platform: Wii U
- Release: NA/EU: October 25, 2013; AU: October 26, 2013; JP: October 31, 2013
- Genre: Party
- Modes: Single-player, multiplayer

Wii Party U (Note: Wiiパーティ U (Wī Pāti Yū) in Japanese) is a 2013 party video game developed by NDcube and published by Nintendo for the Wii U. It was announced in a January 2013 Nintendo Direct, and later detailed at E3 2013 and in the October 2013 Nintendo Direct. It is the sequel to the 2010 Wii game Wii Party.

== Gameplay ==
Wii Party U is a multiplayer video game consisting of a standard board game with mini-games, similar to Mario Party. Over 80 different new mini-games are available. Multiple people can play mini-games using the Wii U GamePad. Wii Party U also includes a new accessory, a stand for the Wii U GamePad to allow support for the tabletop games. "House Party" games also return from Wii Party, and focus on various implementations of the Wii U GamePad and Wii Remotes amongst a group of people.

There are four different types of party modes. The first is the TV Party, which can include up to four players that use the Wii Remotes and the Wii U GamePad on the television. This mode is a board game with each tile having some effect upon the players. The host of the game's name is Party Phil and he controls and announces what happens in the game.

The TV Party mode can be played with one to four players in various modes.

- Highway Rollers: A board game-like mode where players take turns running down a highway. At the start of every turn, players play a minigame to decide the turn order. At the end of each segment, there is an obstacle that the player must overcome in order to progress.
- GamePad Island: A board game taking place on an island. Using the Wii U GamePad, players must play a microgame to determine how many spaces they will move. At the end of most paths, there are challenges that the player must conquer to continue. To play a minigame, players must run into Minigame Balloons that, depending on how the players placed, allows them to move up to five spaces.
- Mii Fashion Plaza: A board game where players race around the Mii Fashion Plaza gathering clothes required for a costume, which begins with them receiving a costume piece from the roulette.
- The Balldozer: As with Highway Rollers, the turn order is decided by minigame. Players drop up to four balls into a machine called the Balldozer that gives them one point for a colored ball and ten points for a gold ball, but they lose five points for a purple skull ball. Starting from round 3, a bonus ring will appear. If a ball falls through it, more balls will be added to the machine.
- Team Building (known as Teammate Madness in Europe): Played similarly to poker, players match up Miis in various jersey colors and numbers to earn points.

The House Party mode requires both the Wii U GamePad and Wii Remotes. The modes are:

- Button Smashers (Button Battle in Europe): Using both the Wii U GamePad and up to four Wii Remotes, players take turns holding down a button that adds one point to the score. The game ends if a player releases or presses an unspecified button.
- Name That Face: Using the Wii U GamePad, one player takes a photo of their face while the others guess what their expression is.
- Lost-and-Found Square: One player, disguised as a pet, has to describe where they currently are as the others race to find them in the fastest time.
- Sketchy Situation: Players take turns using the Wii U GamePad to draw a picture, but one of them is given something different to draw. Players must then guess the drawing that is different from the others.
- Do U Know Mii?: (Who Do They Think You Are? in Europe): A quiz game where players take turns guessing about a player's personality.
- Water Runners: Using the Wii Remote, players must scoop up water from the creek shown on the Wii U GamePad and pour it into their corresponding jar.
- Feed Mii! (Fast Food Frenzy in Europe): With one player as the employee, they must pick out food items the other players order and place them on their corresponding tray.
- Dance With Mii: (Folk Dance Fever in Europe): Players stand in a circle around the Wii U GamePad and move the Wii Remotes that they hold up and down in tune to the music.

The GamePad Party mode has up to two players competing or cooperating in various modes.

- Tabletop Foosball: Two players compete to score the most points in a game of foosball.
- Tabletop Baseball: Played like baseball, players compete to score the most runs after three innings.
- Mii-in-a-Row: A board game where players match their Mii's head, torso, and legs in order to get points.
- Tabletop Gauntlet: Players race to get three balls of their color through a series of contraptions that try to hinder their progress.
- Animal Matchup: Players work together to find matching pictures of animals.
- Puzzle Blockade: A puzzle game where both players work together to complete a puzzle by matching blocks to the picture shown.

There is also a minigame mode.

- Minigame Collection: With up to four players, they can play any minigame of their choice.
- Freeplay Challenge: A single-player mode where the player is tasked with beating their records in four specific minigames. There is also a mode called Demolition Row, where up to two players compete to get their puzzle blocks beneath the line.
- Bridge Burners: Players cooperate to complete a specified task in a 4-player minigame. If they are successful, they will proceed, but if they are not, they lose a heart. Lose three minigames and the team fails.
- Dojo Domination: A single-player mode where the player has ten hearts and faces off with thirty Miis, three opponents at a time. If the player is successful, the Miis they are facing are defeated, but if not, they lose a heart for each Mii that beat them.
- Battle of the Minigames: Players compete to be the first to win in three or five minigames.
- Tabletop Tournament: Players use the Wii U GamePad to face off in "single-elimination or round-robin tabletop tournament."
- Spot the Sneak: One player is selected to get a secret advantage in a 4-player minigame (but must avoid being caught using that advantage) while the others guess who the sneak is after the minigame ends (the sneak also participates in guessing but is not penalized for picking incorrectly). The players that correctly guess the sneak steal points from them, but the sneak steals points from anyone who makes an incorrect prediction.

== Reception ==
Reception

Aggregate scores
Aggregator	Score
GameRankings	65%
Metacritic	65/100

Review scores
Publication	Score
Destructoid	7/10
Edge	5/10
Eurogamer	7/10
GameSpot	5/10
GamesRadar+	3.5/5
IGN	7.5/10
Joystiq	2/5
Nintendo Life	8/10
Nintendo World Report	8/10
The Guardian	1/5

Wii Party U received mixed reviews from critics, with an average Metacritic score of 65/100. According to Edge, "Wii Party U has no rhythm, and you won't realise just how crucial that is to a party game until it's gone." Edge also states that one of Wii Party U's problems is its "multitude of games," while spending "at least as much time explaining itself as it does letting you have fun." Unlike Edge, Nintendo World Report praises the game stating that it is "a fine crowd-pleasing party game," featuring "more than the 2010 Wii game did."

=== Sales ===
In Japan, the game was very well received, selling around than 70,000 physical copies on its first week, boosting Wii U sales system to 38,000 units sold. During the holiday season, the sales of the game were considerably higher, generally occupying the top of the Japanese charts. As of December 31, 2013, more than 518,000 units had been sold only in Japan, entering the year-end Japanese chart at number 10.

As of September 30, 2015, it has worldwide sales of 1.58 million.
