= Wii Party =

2010 video game

- North American cover art
- Developers: NDcube; Nintendo SPD
- Publisher: Nintendo
- Director: Shuichiro Nishiya
- Producers: Atsushi Ikeda; Hiroshi Sato
- Series: Wii
- Platform: Wii
- Release: JP: July 8, 2010; NA: October 3, 2010; AU: October 7, 2010; EU: October 8, 2010
- Genre: Party
- Modes: Single-player, multiplayer

Wii Party (Note: Wiiパーティ (Wī Pāti) in Japanese) is a 2010 party video game developed by NDcube and published by Nintendo for the Wii. The game heavily borrows gameplay elements from the Mario Party series. It is also the first game in the Wii series that Shigeru Miyamoto did not produce. The game was released in Japan on July 8, 2010, in North America on October 3, 2010, in Australia on October 7, 2010, and in Europe on October 8, 2010. Wii Party was revealed by Satoru Iwata in a Financial Results Briefing on May 7, 2010. It received mixed reviews from critics and sold 9.35 million copies worldwide as of September 2021. A sequel, Wii Party U, was released for the Wii U on October 25, 2013.

== Gameplay ==
Friendly Face-Off, one of the minigames in Wii Party, where players race to complete puzzles of their Miis' faces

Wii Party features nine different game modes divided between three categories: Party Games, House Party Games, and Pair Games. Most of the game modes integrate the use of Wii Party's 80 minigames. The game also offers additional modes that make exclusive use of the minigames.

=== Party Games ===
Party Games are games in which up to four players compete against one another.

Board Game Island
The player rolls dice and advances the indicated number of steps (Miis are used as players' game pieces). Players can win a bonus die depending on their placement in a minigame at the start of the round, which increase their chances of advancing further on the board. Players can land on a variety of different spaces, some of which having effects such as moving the player forward or backward. The player who reaches the top of the island first wins.

Globe Trot
Players turn over numbered cards and move the indicated number of spaces (Miis are used as players' game pieces just like in Board Game Island). Players win coins in minigames that can be used to purchase vehicle cards to help them advance, or at airports and seaports to travel long distances. When players reach a hot spot, they can purchase a souvenir photo for 10 coins. After 10 rounds, overtime begins and the first player to reach a hot spot and take a souvenir photo ends the game, winning a bonus photo. The player who has collected the most souvenir photos at that point wins; ties are broken by number of coins.

Swap Meet (Mii of a Kind in the PAL versions)
Players take turns choosing a Mii from the middle to swap out with a Mii from their area. Players who collect three Miis with outfits of the same color in two different rows win points. Various bonuses are based on how Miis are matched. The player who has the most points after a set number of rounds is the winner.

Spin-Off
Players take turns spinning a wheel to earn medals. Depending on where the wheel stops, players can win medals, lose medals, or add medals to the bank. Players can also earn medals saved up in the bank by winning minigames. After ten rounds, overtime begins, and the game ends after any player wins a Bank Battle. The player with the most medals wins.

Bingo
Players check off Miis on their bingo cards that match Mii balls which drop from a large bingo machine. If a minigame ball drops from the bingo machine, players play a minigame and the winner checks off a Mii of their choice. The first player to complete a horizontal, vertical, or diagonal row gets a bingo and is the winner.

=== Pair Games ===
Pair Games are designed for two players and are either cooperative or competitive.

Friend Connection
Players answer five questions before playing a cooperative minigame to test if they are a good pair or a bad pair. They get a better score if their answers to the questions are identical, and if they do well in the minigame. This game requires two human players, and CPU characters cannot participate.

Balance Boat
Players work together to balance twenty Miis on the sails of a ship without letting the ship lean over. Can be played single player with computer player as partner.

Match-Up
Players match up Miis wearing shirts of the same color into pairs to score points. The color of the Mii shirts are hidden until chosen. If players fail to match up a pair, they lose their turn. Players occasionally play duel minigames against each other to win a second turn. The player with the most points after all of the pairs are matched is the winner. Can be played single player with computer player as opponent.

=== House Party ===
House Party Games are activities that focus on the players' environments, with most of them not using the Wii Remote wrist strap because of the unique ways it is being used. One of the games, Quick Draw, is exclusive to the Japanese & South Korean versions.

Animal Tracker
This game requires at least two Wii Remotes. The Wii Remotes are lined up so all players can reach them. An animal will appear on the screen and make a sound. Each Wii Remote will make an animal sound, but only one of them will mimic the animal sound on the TV screen. Whoever grabs the correct Wii Remote scores a point. First to 3 points wins.

Hide and Hunt
One player hides 1-4 Wii Remotes. Everyone else has a time limit to search for all of them. Every 10 seconds, each Wii Remote will produce an animal sound to make locating them easier. Every time someone finds a Wii remote, the hider gets as many points as the number of seconds the person who found it took to locate it. If multiple rounds are chosen, all players take turns hiding, and the player with the most points at the end wins.

Time Bomb
Only one Wii Remote is used regardless of the number of players. Players gently pass it while holding the button shown on the screen. If the Wii Remote is shaken too much or the wrong button is pressed, the bomb will explode.

Word Bomb
Only one Wii Remote is used regardless of the number of players. Players pass it like it is a bomb after saying a word that matches the given category. Whoever is holding the bomb when it explodes loses.

Buddy Quiz
This game is the only one in the house category that requires 3-4 players. After choosing a player to act as the "Buddy", the other players attempt to predict the Buddy's answers to various questions and gain points for predicting correctly.

Quick Draw
This game is excluded from North American & PAL releases, present only in South Korean and Japanese releases. Instead of Wii Remotes, a real-life deck of cards is used where players attempt to grab the card that the game shows.

=== Minigame modes ===
Free Play
Players play any of the minigames provided.

Battle
Two or four players face off in minigames to determine who can win three or five minigames first.

Challenge
This mode features minigames that get progressively more difficult.

Solo
This is a one player minigame quest in which the player challenges five, ten or fifty minigames, to reach the rocket and attempts to last as long as they can.

Spot the Sneak (Rule Reversal in the PAL version)
One player is selected to have a secret advantage in a 4-player minigame (but must avoid being caught using that advantage) while the others guess who the sneak is after the minigame ends (the sneak also participates in guessing, but would not be penalized for picking incorrectly). Players that correctly guess the sneak steal points from them, but the sneak steals points from anyone who makes an incorrect prediction.

== Development ==
After the development of Mario Party 8 and Mario Party DS , several of Hudson Soft's key designers left to work for Nintendo subsidiary NDcube. Wii Party was first revealed to the public by Satoru Iwata during a presentation to investors at E3 2010 on May 7, 2010. In an Iwata Asks interview, NDcube declared "One of the attractions of Mario Party is that you can play with your favorite character", but they "thought that using Mii characters would strengthen the impression that you yourself are playing together with your friends." Iwata also hoped "people will play Wii Party for years to come as the new standard in party game software."

== Reception ==
Reception

Aggregate scores
Aggregator	Score
GameRankings	70.44%
Metacritic	68/100

Review scores
Publication	Score
1Up.com	C−
Eurogamer	7/10
Game Informer	4.5/10
GameSpot	8/10
GameTrailers	7.9/10
IGN	7/10
Nintendo Life	7/10

Wii Party received "mixed or average" reviews from critics, according to the review aggregation website Metacritic. GameSpot awarded Wii Party a score of 8 out of 10, commending the wide variety of minigames and modes. GameSpot also commented that the multiplayer mode "is a blast", and believe Wii Party is "faster and better" than Mario Party. Nintendo World Report gave the game an 8/10, saying "A common complaint about Mario Party is that it has too many things that slow gameplay down to a near halt, such as multiple traps on one game board and waiting for the player to finish his or her turn. Wii Party avoids this by speeding up gameplay". IGN gave the game a 7/10, criticizing the graphics for being bright and colorful and "not exactly pretty", but praising Nintendo for doing a good job of allowing players to follow instructions to get through objectives. GameTrailers gave the game a 7.9, saying "Aside from a few dud modes and some minor control issues, there isn't a whole lot to fault."

Phil Kollar of Game Informer stated in a negative review "Wii Party's 80-plus minigames share the same uneven quality I've come to expect from Mario Party, which makes sense given that many of them are iterations of games from that series. The metagames are even worse. Whereas Mario Party gave players multiple boards to play through, Wii Party features multiple game types, each less exciting than the last."

=== Sales ===
In its first week of release in Japan, Wii Party sold 230,000 units and was the country's best-selling game that week. As of October 5, 2010, Wii Party has sold 1,350,791 units in Japan. The game has sold 9.35 million copies worldwide as of March 2024. The game would go on to be rereleased by Nintendo under its Nintendo Selects collection of games.
