= Wii (video game series) =

Simulation game series

- Genres: Simulation; Party; Sports; Fitness
- Developers: Nintendo EAD; NDcube; Ganbarion; Bandai Namco Studios; TOSE; Nintendo EPD; Eighting
- Publisher: Nintendo
- Platforms: Wii; Wii U Nintendo Switch; Nintendo Switch 2
- First release: Wii Sports; November 19, 2006
- Latest release: Nintendo Switch Sports Resort; October 22, 2026

Wii is a series of simulation games published by Nintendo for the game console of the same name, as well as its successor, the Wii U. After a seven-year hiatus, the game Nintendo Switch Sports, described officially as "a new iteration of the Wii Sports series," was announced, the first game to drop the "Wii" from its title. These games feature a common design theme, with recurring elements including casual-oriented gameplay, casts consisting mostly or entirely of Miis, and control schemes that simulate real-life activities.

The Wii series was conceived by longtime Nintendo developer Shigeru Miyamoto to package and sell similar Wii Remote prototype games in a single package.

== Gameplay ==
The Wii and Wii U consoles use motion sensors in its Wii Remote to allow gameplay that incorporates physical movements by the player to control action within the game. For example, in the Baseball game included in Wii Sports, the player holds the controller like a baseball bat and swings it in order to hit the ball in the game. However, in Wii Chess, on the menus and in actual gameplay, the control scheme makes use of the D-pad on the Wii Remote instead of the Wii Remote Pointer.

== Games ==
Wii has become one of the best-selling video game franchises, with each Wii game selling millions of copies. Wii Sports in particular is regarded as the third best-selling video game of all time, as well as the best-selling single console game of all time. By June 2009, Wii Fit had helped the health game genre to generate collective revenues of $2 billion, most of which was grossed by the game's 18.22 million sales at the time. The largest subset of the franchise is Wii Sports.

=== Wii Sports ===
Game	Console	Release date	Description	Sales
Wii Sports	Wii	NA: November 19, 2006; JP: December 2, 2006; AU: December 7, 2006; EU: December 8, 2006	The first game in the series and a launch game for the Wii console. The game was bundled with the console in all regions except Japan and South Korea. Wii Sports is known for starting a new development direction for Nintendo involving simple gameplay, simple graphics, and motion control. It is one of the best-selling video games of all time, as well as the best-selling single console game of all time.	82.90 million
Wii Sports Resort	Wii	JP: June 25, 2009; AU: July 23, 2009; EU: July 24, 2009; NA: July 26, 2009	Successor to Wii Sports. It is one of the first titles to require the Wii MotionPlus accessory, which was bundled with the game. Although the game was initially sold separately, it was later bundled with the Wii console. It features ten brand new sports while only two sports reappear from Wii Sports, bowling and golf.	33.14 million
Wii Sports Club	Wii U	Tennis & Bowling: JP: October 30, 2013; NA: November 7, 2013; EU: November 7, 2013; AU: November 8, 2013; Golf: WW: December 18, 2013; Baseball & Boxing: NA: June 26, 2014; EU: June 27, 2014; Retail: EU: July 11, 2014; JP: July 17, 2014; NA: July 25, 2014	A remake of the original Wii Sports game for Wii U console, requiring the Wii MotionPlus accessory. Originally a digital-only product, with each sport sold individually, a retail version with all five sports was eventually released.	
Nintendo Switch Sports	Nintendo Switch	WW: April 29, 2022; Golf: WW: November 29, 2022; Basketball: WW: July 9, 2024	A new entry utilizing the Switch's Joy-Con in order to play. It adds 3 new sports, while 3 sports returned at launch from previous entries; bowling, tennis and swordplay, renamed to "Chambara". Golf and basketball were later added to both digital and physical editions.	18.32 million
Nintendo Switch Sports Resort	Nintendo Switch 2	WW: October 22, 2026	A sequel to Nintendo Switch Sports. The sports included are boxing, table tennis, archery, tennis, volleyball, bowling, basketball, golf, thumb wrestling, skateboarding, power cruising and prop plane. It also includes Jump Rope as an additional "warm-up".	

=== Wii Play ===
Game	Console	Release date	Description	Sales
Wii Play	Wii	JP: December 2, 2006; AU: December 7, 2006; EU: December 8, 2006; NA: February 12, 2007	A launch game for the Wii in Japan, Europe and Australia, it features nine minigames used to teach the user how to use the Wii Remote, including Shooting Range (inspired by Nintendo’s Duck Hunt) and Table Tennis. Wii Play was bundled with an extra Wii Remote and is one of the best selling video games of all time.	28.02 million
Wii Play: Motion	Wii	NA: June 13, 2011; EU: June 24, 2011; AU: June 30, 2011; JP: July 7, 2011	Includes twelve minigames and is bundled with the Wii Remote Plus, which is required to play. The minigames were created by various developers, including Good-Feel, Skip Ltd., and Arzest Corporation.	1.26 million

=== Wii Fit ===
Game	Console	Release date	Description	Sales
Wii Fit	Wii	JP: December 1, 2007; EU: April 25, 2008; AU: May 8, 2008; NA: May 21, 2008	The first game to use the Wii Balance Board peripheral, which it was bundled with. As a fitness-oriented game, it measures a user's weight, telling the user their health based on body mass index, and features minigames for the user to exercise or to improve posture.	22.67 million
Wii Fit Plus	Wii	JP: October 1, 2009; NA: October 4, 2009; AU: October 15, 2009; EU: October 30, 2009	An enhanced version of the original Wii Fit game. Included a new Training Plus minigame category, My Wii Fit Plus, an area that allows the player to perform workouts that they created, and premade workouts, a Multiplayer mode, and the ability to register babies and dogs/cats.	21.13 million
Wii Fit U	Wii U	JP: October 31, 2013; NA/EU: November 1, 2013; AU: November 2, 2013	A new entry for the Wii U console expanding on some of the content added in Wii Fit Plus, including a new Dance minigame category, new workout options, Miiverse support as a Gym Community, and the ability to use a Fit Meter, a pedometer specifically made for Wii Fit U that tracks steps and elevation.	

=== Wii Party ===
Game	Console	Release date	Description	Sales
Wii Party	Wii	JP: July 8, 2010; NA: October 3, 2010; AU: October 7, 2010; EU: October 8, 2010	Players partake in various party games, similar to the Mario Party series.	9.35 million
Wii Party U	Wii U	NA: October 25, 2013; EU: October 25, 2013; AU: October 26, 2013; JP: October 31, 2013	A sequel to Wii Party for the Wii U console, developed by the same team behind the original Wii Party game.	1.58 million

=== Other titles ===
Game	Console	Release date	Description	Sales
Wii Chess	Wii WiiWare	EU: January 18, 2008; JP: September 30, 2008	A chess game playable in either single player or online mode. The game was released under the name "Tsūshin Taikyoku: World Chess" as WiiWare in Japan, and the physical release was exclusive to the European market. The game was never released outside Europe and Japan.	
Wii Music	Wii	JP: October 16, 2008; NA: October 20, 2008; AU: November 13, 2008; EU: November 14, 2008	Players use the Wii Remote and Nunchuk to simulate playing instruments.	2.65 million
Wii Karaoke U	Wii U	JP: December 8, 2012; EU: October 4, 2013	Players can either use a USB microphone or the microphone on the Wii U GamePad to sing along to the music.	
