= Wii Sports Club =

2014 video game

- Box art depicting the game avatars, Miis, playing the five sports: (clockwise from top left) bowling, golf, baseball, tennis, and boxing. The Wii U GamePad is depicted with a Wii Remote playing golf in the middle.
- Developers: Bandai Namco Studios; Nintendo EAD
- Publisher: Nintendo
- Director: Takayuki Shimamura
- Producer: Katsuya Eguchi
- Designer: Daisuke Kageyama
- Programmer: Souichi Nakajima
- Artist: Ryo Koizumi
- Series: Wii
- Platform: Wii U
- Release: EU: July 11, 2014; AU: July 12, 2014; JP: July 17, 2014; NA: July 25, 2014
- Genre: Sports
- Modes: Single-player, multiplayer

Wii Sports Club (Note: Wii スポーツ クラブ (Wī Supōtsu Kurabu) in Japanese) is a 2014 sports simulation video game developed by Nintendo and Bandai Namco Studios and published by Nintendo for the Wii U. It is the third entry in the Wii Sports series, following Wii Sports Resort (2009), a part of the larger Wii series. As an enhanced remake of the Wii launch title Wii Sports (2006), it includes five minigames that replicate tennis, baseball, bowling, golf, and boxing, and are controlled with motion controls that replicate the sports.

New to the game is additional control schemes using the Wii U GamePad, online multiplayer, and Wii Motion Plus support. Players are organized into clubs that represent different regions, and scores and stats were tracked on Nintendo's social network Miiverse. Players could also communicate with each other during and after online matches using Miiverse. Each sport could be purchased individually or rented for a certain amount of time via a pass.

Wii Sports was remade per the request of Nintendo president Satoru Iwata, as well as to take advantage of Wii Motion Plus and GamePad technology. Since online play was demanded by fans, it was prioritized, as well as Miiverse support, which was designed with a sense of community. Wii Sports Club received a mixed reception, being praised for its new additions and controls but criticized for its technical issues.

== Gameplay ==
An online match of tennis. Players are chatting with each other using Miiverse.

Wii Sports Club is a remaster of Wii Sports with HD graphics. Similarly to Wii Sports, Club consists of five minigames that replicate real-world sports: tennis, baseball, bowling, golf, and boxing. Each game uses the Wii Remote Plus and its motion controls, which the player uses to replicate the motions involved in its associated sport; unlike the original Wii Sports, Boxing does not use the Nunchuk, and uses either one, or 2 Wii Remote Plus controllers for one player. For example, the player holds and swings the Wii Remote to mimic swinging a tennis racket, baseball bat, and golf clubs. Each game can be played in single-player, or local multiplayer supporting 2 or four player depending on the sport. Gameplay is generally the same as its predecessor, although Baseball and Golf utilize the Wii U GamePad; in Baseball, the player uses the GamePad to aim and pitch at the batter, and in Golf, the GamePad is set on the ground and displays a ball, which the player uses to aim and hit. Each sport has additional side modes focus on the sport's gameplay, such as playing whack-a-mole using tennis controls and playing a game of bingo by hitting golf balls on a golf field.

The main difference between the two games is the addition of online multiplayer. The player can compete against others online in all sports; Tennis, Baseball, and Boxing feature real-time gameplay, while Bowling and Golf are turn-based. Online gameplay is against other regions, and stats and rankings are kept track of on Nintendo's social network for the console, Miiverse. Players join a group depending on their region, referred to as clubs, and clubs compete against each other online and are ranked on Miiverse. In matches, players can use the "Online Banter" feature to communicate in-game using pre-set messages and drawings from the GamePad.

Upon playing each minigame for the first time, the player had access to it for the following 24 hours, upon which they would need to pay to use it again. The player could purchase the "gold pass" for 10 dollars, which was used to purchase and use an individual sport forever, or they could purchase the "day pass" for 2 dollars, where they had full access to all sports for 24 hours.

== Development ==
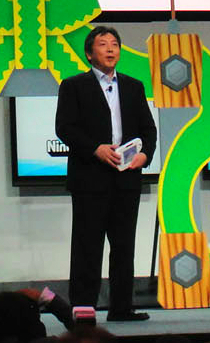
Katsuya Eguchi, the game's producer, with the Wii U GamePad at E3 2012

Wii Sports Club was developed by Nintendo EAD and Bandai Namco Studios. Although the game was originally to be developed only by Bandai Namco, the staff from Nintendo EAD had "strong feelings" about Wii Sports and wanted to be involved with its development regardless. Takayuki Shimamura, lead director of Wii Sports and Wii Sports Resort, reprised his role; he volunteered to do so, believing he would regret it if he didn't. Ryunosuke Suzuki and Kozo Makino served as coordinators between the two development teams, but would be more actively involved with the game itself as development progressed. Although working in different areas proved challenging for the companies, it made testing online gameplay easier. Katsuya Eguchi was the game's producer; he also produced Wii Sports.

=== Design ===
When the Wii U was released, Nintendo president Satoru Iwata, a fan of Wii Sports, emailed Eguchi requesting for the game to be made playable for the Wii U. There were two main reasons why a remake for Wii Sports was made was because they wanted to see Wii Sports utilize the Wii U GamePad and the Wii Remote Plus, a traditional Wii Remote with the Wii MotionPlus accessory built in. They also wanted to see if online play was possible for the title, a mode frequently requested by fans of Wii Sports. Online play was the first and prioritized focus of Wii Sports Club for this reason. Iwata enforced that online play should be possible for Golf and Boxing, and for other sports is possible. Tennis proved to be the most challenging to create online support for, and since Tennis was the representative title of Wii Sports, it was worked on first. The difficulty came from synchronizing gameplay in real-time between players and processing the specific motions made from the Wii Remote. An idea from a programmer at Bandai Namco was used as the foundation of the online gameplay's functionality. With the Wii Remote Plus they were able to make gameplay more diverse, such as allowing the player to be able to hit the ball overhand or underhand with its motion controls. Golf controls were also designed to be more realistic; the Wii U GamePad displays a ball that the player sets on the ground, and the hit depends on the angle and force the Wii Remote is swung based on the GamePad. Iwata delayed personally playtesting the game so he could play the game for the first time during an Iwata Asks interview with the Wii Sports Club team in 2013; he personally enjoyed the Tennis demo.

Iwata also requested that the game support Miiverse, a social network made by Nintendo for the Wii U and Nintendo 3DS. The developers feared that Miiverse would become a toxic community because of this; they believed only people who won would want to use the network, discouraging those who did not. In order to create a sense of community, they grouped up players on the network into their local states, provinces, and prefectures, to encourage competition against regions instead of individual people. This function, referred to as clubs, became the center focus of the game. Competing clubs were organized in a stats board that changed in real-time; the developers used the clubs' winning percentage over games won overall for this stat so there wouldn't be favoritism to regions with larger populations. Other stats that were kept track of, such as the total amount of pins knocked over in Bowling, that didn't involve winning to encourage the player to keep playing if they lost. Handwritten Miiverse posts from a players' club would also show up during gameplay, congratulating and encouraging them, for this reason. During an online match, the developers included a feature called "Online Banter", where players can send each competitive remarks to each other in between gameplay, to encourage further competition between clubs.

Minigames were made purchasable so the developers could release the sports over time, allowing them more time to figure out online play for more difficult sports. Wii Sports Club was included on the Wii U automatically if the player accepted SpotPass support when using the Wii U for the first time; to encourage the player to purchase the game, it was made playable for free for the first 24 hours. So the player could test the new sports as they were released, they were also made playable for the first 24 hours.

=== Announcement and release ===
The game was announced during a September 2013 Nintendo Direct presentation focused on another game in the Wii series for Wii U, Wii Fit U. The first screenshots and gameplay videos were shown, along with various details about new features to the sports. It was detailed that the game would launch with Bowling and Tennis, with the remaining sports from Wii Sports to be released at a later date. A free 24-hour trial was offered following initial download and installation of the software, after which the fees were required. The game was released initially on the Nintendo eShop to push Nintendo's digital distribution strategy, with some shared ideas as Wii Fit U. The first set of sports, Bowling and Tennis, were released in Japan on October 30, 2013, and in Europe and North America on November 7, 2013. Golf was later released following a Nintendo Direct presentation on December 18, 2013, which later received an update including nine courses from Wii Sports Resort, and Baseball and Boxing were released on June 27, 2014, worldwide. A bundle containing a Wii U and a copy of the game containing all five sports was released in Japan on March 27, 2014. The complete version was physically sold separately starting in 2014 on July 11 in Europe, July 12 in Australia, July 17 in Japan, and July 25 in North America. According to Iwata, the game got a physical release to help boost sales.

== Reception ==
Reception

Aggregate scores
Aggregator	Score
GameRankings	69%
Metacritic	68/100
OpenCritic	25% recommend

Review scores
Publication	Score
GameSpot	6/10
IGN	8/10
Nintendo Life	7/10
VG247	3/5

Wii Sports Club received a 68/100 on review aggregator website Metacritic based on 22 reviews, indicating "mixed or average reviews". Fellow review aggregator OpenCritic assessed that the game received fair approval, being recommended by 25% of critics.

GameSpot reviewer Heidi Kemps enjoyed the more complex motion controls and how it affected gameplay more than the original Wii Sports. The motion controls were also praised by IGN's Scott Thompson, who was impressed with their complexity, and was surprised how much they have improved since Wii Sports Resort. Thompson also lauded the use of the Wii U GamePad in Golf and Baseball for making them more entertaining and realistic, although Kemps cited concern in the GamePad being placed on the ground, where it could possibly be damaged.

Tennis was praised for its precise controls, especially because it was absent from Wii Sports Resort. Thompson also lauded Bowling for its precision, but Nintendo World Report was disappointed in the lack of GamePad support. Golf was praised for replicating its sport most accurately with the GamePad; Nintendo World Report considered Golf to be the best sport in the game for this reason. Baseball was praised for its addition of more advanced controls for pitching, with Thompson calling it "a fun sense of sort-of augmented reality in its execution." Boxing was considered to be the weakest entry in the game similar to Wii Sports for its unintuitive controls, although cited controls to be more precise controls. Kemps considered the side modes "a nice distraction".

While the addition of online play was overall seen as a positive, critics derided its technical issues. Kemps criticized the online gameplay for technical reasons, such as real-time lag and matchmaking process, but also its restrictive options that allowed little variance in matches. Thompson expressed frustrations in games like Bowling and Golf that were turn-based, resulting in slow gameplay that involved a lot of waiting. He also noted what he referred to as "someone who skipped the tutorial" in every match online, as he was often paired with someone of considerably less skill resulting in more extensive waiting. However, games like Tennis and Baseball fared much better with more focus on real-time gameplay.
