= Miitopia =

Role-playing video game

- 3DS cover artwork
- Developer: Nintendo EPD (Note: Additional work by Good-Feel. Grezzo co-developed the Nintendo Switch version.)
- Publisher: Nintendo
- Director: Yuichiro Ito
- Producer: Kouichi Kawamoto
- Designer: Kazuhiro Yoshikawa
- Programmer: Takaomi Ueno
- Artist: Kyohei Seki
- Writer: Reizo Hirama
- Composer: Toshiyuki Sudo
- Platforms: Nintendo 3DS, Nintendo Switch
- Release: Nintendo 3DS: JP: December 8, 2016; WW: July 28, 2017; Nintendo Switch: WW: May 21, 2021
- Genres: Action-adventure, role-playing
- Mode: Single-player

Miitopia (Note: Japanese: ミートピア, Hepburn: Mītopia) is a role-playing video game developed and published by Nintendo for the Nintendo 3DS, with a remastered version released for the Nintendo Switch. Set in the eponymous land of Miitopia, the game features a fully customizable cast of Mii avatars in roles ranging from protagonists and non-player characters to antagonists. Its narrative centers on a party of Mii adventurers as they journey to defeat the Dark Lord, who is responsible for stealing the faces of Miitopia's inhabitants.

Miitopia sees each of the player's Miis, all assuming different character classes, explore hostile areas linearly strewn about a hub world and fight monsters by way of a turn-based battle system. Only the player's central Mii can be controlled during fights, with all other party members being computer-controlled. In between combat encounters, inns are visited where the Miis rest, eat food, converse amongst each other, and form interpersonal relationships in a manner similar to a life simulation game.

Miitopia was first conceived as "an enhanced version" of the Mii-centric StreetPass Quest adventure games included within StreetPass Mii Plaza, a built-in application for the 3DS. Inspiration was also taken from producer Kouichi Kawamoto's personal experiences with character customizability in a Nintendo Entertainment System RPG. Having the Miis fight monsters and bicker amongst each other autonomously, without player input, was born from a desire to make them more lifelike. Miitopia was released in Japan on December 8, 2016 and worldwide in 2017 for the 3DS. A remastered version co-developed by Grezzo for the Switch released on May 21, 2021.

The 3DS version of Miitopia sold 1.22 million copies by December 31, 2022, while the Switch version sold 1.79 million copies as of November 2023. Both received mixed reviews; outlets praised the game's artistic presentation and life simulation elements—many directly comparing it to Tomodachi Life (2013)—but criticized its narrative, combat system, and hands-off gameplay structure as repetitive and lackluster. Additional customization features introduced in the Switch remaster were received positively by numerous outlets.

== Gameplay ==
Two Mii characters engaging in the game's combat sequence on the 3DS version. Players' statistics and actions can be viewed on the 3DS's bottom screen.

Miitopia is a role-playing video game with life simulation elements. Its cast of protagonists, non-player characters, and antagonists is fully customizable as Mii avatars, created gradually as the story progresses. These avatars can be made from scratch or imported through a number of outlets. In the 3DS version, such methods include transferring Miis from the 3DS' built-in Mii Maker application, importing existing Miis from Tomodachi Life (2013), selecting Miis from the user's friends list, scanning a specialized QR code, or searching through an online database of player-made Miis. For the Switch remaster, the player can transfer Miis from their Switch or use a similar online database accessible through the Nintendo Switch Online service. The remaster also introduces "makeup" and wigs that permit further Mii customization in the form of additional hair types, eyes, facial features, and miscellaneous shapes.

Miitopia's gameplay centers on the player's party of Mii adventurers, which is limited to four members. The player assigns each party member a personality type and one of several character classes, named "jobs", which can serve offensive or supportive roles. These include warriors, mages, thieves, idols, and others; as the game progresses, more classes become available. The party explores levels linearly strewn about a hub world. Once the player selects a level, a cutscene plays where the Miis automatically walk in a straight line along a preset path, triggering comedic skits and randomly encountering monsters to be fought in turn-based combat. Only the player's main Mii is manually controlled during a fight; all other teammates attack enemies and use items autonomously through artificial intelligence. A toggleable "auto-battle" feature makes offensive combat removed from direct player input. A Mii's designated personality can influence their behavior during combat; for example, a "stubborn" Mii may refuse to fight during its turn, while a "kind" Mii may offer to protect a teammate from harm.

Each Mii has personalized statistics in the form of health points (HP), magic points (MP), Attack, Defense, Magic, and Speed; MP is used to employ powerful skills as opposed to standard attacks. During combat, items known as "sprinkles" can be applied to Miis to increase their HP or MP. A Mii can also be moved to "Safe Spots" where enemies cannot target them, allowing their HP and MP to automatically replenish, but as consequence the Mii loses a turn. As levels are completed, the player acquires in-game currency in the form of gold coins.

The end of a level is marked by an inn that the party visits, where the player assigns Miis their rooms, feeds them to upgrade their combat statistics, purchase new gear using coins, and play minigames. While at the inn, Miis can spontaneously begin dialogue with each other, forming interpersonal relationships whose intimacy is quantified through levels. These connections later impact the flow of gameplay during combat encounters. Namely, friendships generate new tag team abilities as their intimacy level increases. Heated conflict can also occur, causing them to betray one another and detract focus away from combat. Connections grow stronger if two party members are placed in the same room at an inn. The Switch version introduces a customizable horse companion that aids in combat and has its own relationship level, as well as "outings" that involve sending two Miis on an excursion during inn visits to increase their relationship level. Outings are accessed via "outing tickets" obtained through play.

== Plot ==
The Dark Lord reigns terror over the land of Miitopia, forcefully stealing its inhabitants' faces and attaching them to otherwise peaceful creatures to become hostile monsters. The main protagonist, a traveling Mii of the player's choice addressed as "the hero", arrives in the village of Greenhorne. The Dark Lord abruptly attacks the town and steals the faces of its citizens. At the request of a divine guardian, the hero chooses a character class and ventures to stop the Dark Lord and recover the faces of their victims. As the hero rescues Greenhorne's citizens, they are joined by adventurer companions and meets the Great Sage. The team enters the kingdom of Neksdor, but the Dark Lord attacks, kidnapping the hero's companions and rendering them without a class. After the guardian gives the hero new powers, they journey through Neksdor, meeting three new companions. The team continues on to the Realm of the Fey, where the Dark Lord strikes, stealing the hero's companions and their class once more, prompting the guardian to provide a new group of classes. The hero is tasked with retrieving the faces of the elder two of the three guardian Fab Fairies of the Realm, who show the team the way to the Dark Lord's castle in Karkaton. Before they can open the passageway, the Dark Lord steals the face of the youngest Fab Fairy. After retrieving her face, all three Fab Fairies open the door to Karkaton. When the team arrives there, the Dark Lord attacks again, stealing the hero's new companions but not their powers. The hero is tasked with saving their friends with help from the Great Sage.

The hero and their teammates, now reunited, confront and fight the Dark Lord. In its defeat, it is revealed that they were a common Mii who a wisp known as the Dark Curse possessed. The Dark Curse attempts to possess the hero, but the Great Sage intervenes and is possessed instead, becoming the Darker Lord. The team tracks follows the Darker Lord to the top of its domain in The Sky Scraper. The party venture into the Otherworld for a final showdown with the Darker Lord; although it evolves into the Darkest Lord, it is ultimately defeated. The Great Sage is freed and traps the Dark Curse, then explains its history to the hero. It was once an ordinary Mii who was rejected by their peers because they had a bland face. Ridding themselves of their face, they gradually became a soul of hatred and malice, amalgamating into the Dark Curse. The hero is given the choice to either destroy the Dark Curse or provide them with a new face and body. If the hero provides the Dark Curse with a new life, the Great Sage takes them on their travels to have them atone for their mistakes. If the hero banishes the Dark Curse, they use their divine power to destroy it. Regardless of the outcome, they are celebrated for saving Miitopia.

== Development and release ==
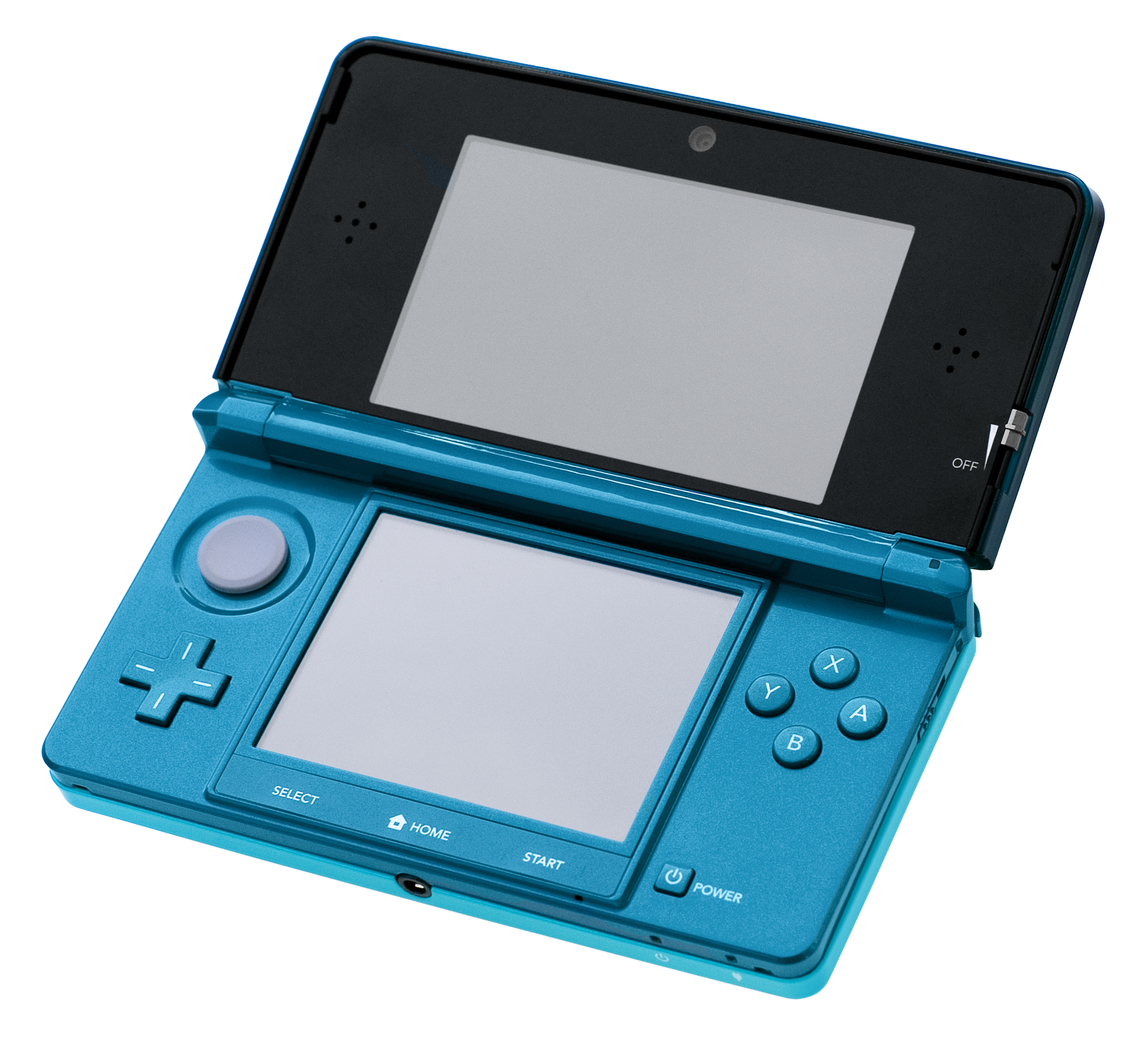
Miitopia was developed for the Nintendo 3DS (pictured). It was initially inspired by the StreetPass Quest games included within StreetPass Mii Plaza, a built-in application for the 3DS that made use of the system's StreetPass mechanic to acquire other 3DS users' Miis.

Miitopia was developed primarily by Nintendo Entertainment Planning and Development (EPD) for the Nintendo 3DS. Its in-game backgrounds, weapons, and clothing were designed with assistance from Good-Feel. The game's core production team began relatively small but grew to approximately 30 in-house members alongside a number of third-party developers. Some graphic designers hailing from Tomodachi Life's development team also provided assistance.

The initial inspiration for Miitopia originated from StreetPass Quest and StreetPass Quest II, (Note: Known as Find Mii and Find Mii II in North America) two adventure games included within StreetPass Mii Plaza, a built-in 3DS application, that involved sending Miis obtained through StreetPass on a journey to rescue the player's own Mii. (Note: StreetPass is a built-in mechanic for the 3DS that allows a console to wirelessly exchange player data between other 3DS consoles in the immediate area. Such player data includes Mii characters, which when collected from other consoles appear within StreetPass Mii Plaza.) In light of their popularity among players, the idea to create "an enhanced version" of the StreetPass Quest games was formulated, and both games' developers would go on to become the directors of Miitopia. Despite the StreetPass Quest games' influences, StreetPass features themselves were not included in Miitopia since the probability of StreetPass functioning as intended could differ between regions. Producer Kouichi Kawamoto, who also directed StreetPass Mii Plaza, additionally agreed with an interviewer's comment that since most Miis acquired through StreetPass will be of strangers to the user, empathizing with them during an adventure would become difficult.

Around the same time, Kawamoto played a Nintendo Entertainment System RPG through the Wii's Virtual Console service with his wife and two children. He found that the game became especially enjoyable when he named the in-game characters after his family, and this experience cemented his belief in the potential for a customizable Mii-centric RPG. Kawamoto also thought there were very few story-driven games that included Miis as characters. Beyond traditional fantasy character classes such as Warriors and Mages, the team included more unorthodox professions such as Cats, Flowers, and Tanks to make the game more enjoyable for players unfamiliar with fantasy settings. Kawamoto stated that while each profession has specific synergies with other professions, he took care to balance their strengths and weaknesses such that battles would still be manageable even if every party member was of the same profession.

Kawmoto was first concerned with making a game that "was easy to pick up and play", but Miitopia quickly grew in scope as the team continued adding ideas. During the project's early stages, Kawamoto penned several concepts for the game's hostile monsters, but virtually all of them were rejected by his superiors. The only design that was met with positive reception was one for an enemy that would steal one of the Miis' faces; this idea was expanded upon to create the story's overarching conflict.

A core focus during development was giving the Miis authentic personalities, as though they were people with wills of their own. The initial plan was to have the player manually control each individual Mii, in line with traditional RPGs. This was scrapped when the team decided this framework did not justify making Miis the main characters, as they felt that fights would play identically no matter who each Mii was based on. They instead made it so that party members fight autonomously to make them more lifelike. Since the player observes the Miis from a third-person perspective, the team characterized Miitopia as "closer to a simulation game than an RPG," though Kawamoto stated that creating a simulation game was not their initial intention. Making it possible for party members to bicker amongst each other was done to mirror real-world relationships. The team was conscious of the possibility that some players may find manual Mii creation troublesome, and thus implemented an online database of player-made Miis to allow them to easily add any character they desired. Furthermore, Kawamoto personally requested developers working on the smartphone application Miitomo to add QR code functionality for said app's Mii characters to allow existing Miitomo users to import their friends' Miis into Miitopia. Development took around three and a half years to conclude in total.

=== Release ===
Miitopia was first teased during a Nintendo Direct dedicated to 3DS software held on September 1, 2016; the game was slated for release by the end of that year. During a Direct centered on Animal Crossing: New Leaf (2012), broadcast on November 2, Nintendo unveiled that a Miitopia Direct was to be held on November 5, as well as its Japanese release date. It released in Japan on December 8, 2016. It later released worldwide in the United States and Europe on July 28, 2017 and in Australia on July 29. A demo version was distributed through the 3DS' eShop one month earlier on June 14.

A Nintendo Switch remaster of Miitopia co-developed by Grezzo, who previously worked on The Legend of Zelda: Link's Awakening (2019), was announced in a Direct held on February 17, 2021. A trial version was made available on April 28, and the game fully released on May 21.

== Reception ==
=== Critical response ===
Miitopia

Aggregate scores
Aggregator	Score	
Aggregator	3DS	NS
Metacritic	67/100 (Note: Based on 50 critic reviews)	71/100 (Note: Based on 60 critic reviews)
OpenCritic	28% recommend (Note: Based on 50 critic reviews)	35% recommend (Note: Based on 46 critic reviews)

Review scores
Publication	Score	
Publication	3DS	NS
Famitsu	31/40	N/A
Game Informer	7.5/10	N/A
GameRevolution	5/10	N/A
GameSpot	5/10	5/10
Nintendo Life	8/10	7/10
Nintendo World Report	6/10	6.5/10
Pocket Gamer	3.5/5	N/A
Polygon	8/10	N/A
RPGamer	3.5/5	2.5/5
USgamer	2.5/5	N/A

Miitopia received "mixed or average" reviews from critics on both 3DS and Switch, according to review aggregator website Metacritic. Both platforms received a "fair" rating from fellow aggregator OpenCritic, with 28% and 35% of critics recommending the 3DS and Switch versions respectively. Famitsu awarded the 3DS version a score of 31/40.

Miitopia's offbeat tone and life simulation elements were met with praise and direct comparisons to Tomodachi Life. While acknowledging its influences from traditional Japanese role-playing games, Mundy of Pocket Gamer felt Miitopia was moreso a casual, social experience akin to Tomodachi Life. In describing the Miitopia's personality system, Jeff Cork of Game Informer called it a hybrid between Tomodachi Life and "an old-school RPG". While Jonathan Leack from GameRevolution draws a similar comparison between Miitopia and Tomodachi Life, his opinion of the former was less favorable, feeling that the interactions between characters in Miitopia were "let down by uninteresting writing" and were less humorous compared to Tomodachi Life. Caty McCarthy of USgamer likewise felt Miitopia was inferior to Tomodachi Life, writing that its comedy and gameplay was too repetitive to replicate the latter's whimsical personality.

The narrative, described as simple or generic, garnered mixed opinions. Cork felt Miitopia's story was insufficiently engaging to justify its long runtime. McCarthy felt conflicted on the amount of content locked behind Miitopia's post-game following its final boss; while she remarked that during this portion the game "finally came into its own", she was displeased that it took "dozens of hours to get there". Reviewing the Switch version, Alex Olney of Nintendo Life lauded the game's status as an informal crossover, with players incentivized to include any real or fictional individual as a character, as "turn[ing] a fairly basic plot into something genuinely memorable". He felt that the interludes between comedic scenes could become monotonous regardless. Heidi Kemps of GameSpot felt the story was aptly charming for a game centered on Miis but nonetheless mostly a novelty. Miitopia's artistic presentation elicited praise; many critics described its art style as diverse, bold, and colorful. Reception towards its soundtrack was more divisive; some described it as a highlight of the experience while others found it unremarkable.

Miitopia's combat mechanics were met with lukewarm reception. Most critics cited creativity to be Miitopia's greatest asset; Cork, Kemps, Leack, and Frank agreed that its creative spin on a more traditional role-playing concept was ultimately its main highlight. Leack lamented unchallenging combat in earlier parts of the game, while Frank felt the high frequency of battles produced a trite gameplay experience. They both found that the auto-battle mechanic mitigated, but did not completely solve, this issue. Also criticized was that all party members except for the player's Mii were controlled by AI, predicting that this lack of control could lead to frustration. Frank praised the "hidden intricacies" of the battle system as creative, due to characters' jobs and personality traits affecting their combat style.

A lack of focus on direct player involvement was critiqued. Leack opined that an absence of player input when exploring areas made him feel like the game was on autopilot most of the time. Similarly, Kemps felt that Miitopia was a "slow slog you mostly watch rather than play", and Mundy also discussed a lack of challenge and player input. Reviewing the Switch version, Chris Scullion of Video Games Chronicle appreciated Miitopia's potential as an early introduction to the RPG genre for younger gamers, but believed players of any other persuasion would be disappointed in its gameplay's lack of mechanical depth. Allegra Frank of Polygon had similar feelings, saying that its gameplay structure often let the Miis "do their thing", but found that this was often enough to entertain her. She highlighted that the more uninvolved segments of Miitopia were balanced out by its overall dynamic nature, saying that it switched up its gameplay often enough to keep her engaged. The frequency of Miis experiencing comedic events during exploration cutscenes purely on their own was commended by Ozzie Mejia of Shacknews; he favorably compared Miitopia's customizable cast and air of unpredictability to a Dungeons & Dragons campaign.

The additional customization features introduced in the Switch remaster were highlighted favorably. Alex Olney lauded the makeup mechanic as innovative and flexible, judging that it allows players to make accurate caricatures of "just about anyone and anything you can imagine". Mejia thought the addition of makeup made Mii creation engaging. Kat Bailey and Rebekah Valentine of IGN as well as Ana Diaz of Polygon commented on makeup's versatility in allowing the player to create virtually anything they desired in Mii form, and highlighted the number of custom Miis being shared online.

=== Sales ===
By February 2017, the 3DS version of Miitopia had sold over 168,000 copies in Japan. It became the ninth-best-selling 3DS game in the US in 2017. It amassed 1.22 million lifetime sales by December 31, 2022.

The Switch remaster was positioned at the top spot of Amazon's pre-order rankings in Japan. During its first week in the UK, the Switch remaster sold 36% more copies at launch than the 3DS version, debuting at #2 behind Resident Evil Village (2021). In Japan, the Switch port launched at #2 behind Rune Factory 5 (2021) with 72,725 physical copies sold, three times the sales of the 3DS version. By its second week of release, the remaster surpassed competition to take the #1 weekly sales spot in Japan, with 34,451 physical copies sold. According to Media Create, the Switch port debuted at #1 in South Korea. The Switch version has sold 1.79 million copies as of November 2023.
