= Nintendo Switch Sports Resort =

2026 video game

- Developer: Nintendo EPD
- Publisher: Nintendo
- Director: Shinji Okane
- Producers: Kouchi Kawamoto; Takeyuki Shimamura; Yoshikazu Yamashita
- Designer: Shinya Kubota
- Artists: Junji Mori; Mizuki Takeuchi
- Composers: Takuhiro Honda; Sayako Doi; Mahiro Hiradate
- Series: Wii
- Platform: Nintendo Switch 2
- Release: October 22, 2026
- Genre: Sports
- Modes: Single-player, multiplayer

Nintendo Switch Sports Resort (Note: Japanese: Nintendo Switch スポーツ リゾート, Hepburn: Nintendō Suitchi Supōtsu Rizōto) is a 2026 sports video game developed by Nintendo EPD, and published by Nintendo for the Nintendo Switch 2. It is a sequel to Nintendo Switch Sports, with elements based on Wii Sports and Wii Sports Resort.

The game was first announced in a Nintendo Direct held on June 9, 2026. Nintendo Switch Sports Resort features a collection of twelve sports, with some found in previous entries of the series. It adds an open world version of Wuhu Island, the setting for Wii Sports Resort. The game uses the Joy-Con 2's motion and mouse controls for gameplay. It was released worldwide on October 22, 2026. The game received generally positive reviews from critics.

== Gameplay ==
Much like Wii Sports titles, the game is a compilation of various sports that use motion controls to recreate actions from their respective sports, using the Joy-Con 2's gyroscope or mouse controls. The game is set on Wuhu Island (the setting used previously in Wii Sports Resort). The game retains the "Sportsmates" avatars seen in its predecessor, as well as the ability to use Mii characters.

The game features twelve main sports: Archery, Boxing, Table tennis, Tennis, Volleyball, Bowling, Basketball, Golf, Thumb Wrestling, Skateboarding, Power Cruising, and Prop Plane. Jump Rope is provided as a warm-up sport. Of the eight sports featured in the original Nintendo Switch Sports, only badminton, chambara, and football, also known as soccer in the United States, do not return as sports in the game.

In its Comic Con presentations, 100 Pin Bowling was confirmed to be available as a side mode, alongside a 4-player mode for Power Cruising.

== Development and release ==
Nintendo Switch Sports Resort was first announced in a Nintendo Direct held on June 9, 2026, showcasing the twelve main sports and the worldwide release date of October 22, 2026. One of the sports, Thumb Wrestling, was featured in an extended demonstration by Nintendo executive Yoshiaki Koizumi during the Nintendo Direct.

== Reception ==
Reception

Aggregate scores
Aggregator	Score
Metacritic	79/100 (Note: Based on 91 reviews)
OpenCritic	81% recommend (Note: Based on 80 reviews)

Nintendo Switch Sports Resort received "generally favorable" reviews according to the review aggregator website Metacritic. OpenCritic reported that 81% of critics recommended the game.

The game was nominated for "Best Sports/Racing Game" and "Best Family Game" at The Game Awards 2026.
