= Wii Fit U =

2013 video game

- North American packaging artwork
- Developers: Nintendo EAD; Ganbarion
- Publisher: Nintendo
- Directors: Hiroshi Matsunaga; Hirofumi Irie
- Producers: Tadashi Sugiyama; Chikako Yamakura
- Programmer: Minoru Sudo
- Composer: Takayuki Kobara
- Series: Wii
- Platform: Wii U
- Release: JP: October 31, 2013; NA/EU: November 1, 2013; AU: November 2, 2013
- Genre: Exergaming
- Mode: Single-player

Wii Fit U (Note: Wiiフィット U (Wī Fitto Yū) in Japanese) is a 2013 exergaming video game developed by Nintendo and Ganbarion and published by Nintendo for the Wii U. An installment in the Wii series, it is the successor to the Wii games Wii Fit and Wii Fit Plus. Wii Fit U utilizes both the Wii Balance Board and the Wii U GamePad in gameplay, and is bundled with the newly introduced Fit Meter, an activity meter accessory. It was released in Japan on October 31, 2013, followed by North America and Europe one day later. It is also the only game on the system to support the balance board.

== Gameplay ==
Like its predecessors Wii Fit and Wii Fit Plus, Wii Fit U focuses on engaging the player in physical activities, including yoga and strength training, through use of the Wii Balance Board, a platform peripheral upon which the player stands during play that measures the player's weight and center of balance. Wii Fit U introduces additional activities that add the Wii U GamePad into gameplay. Owners of Wii Fit or Wii Fit Plus can transfer all saved data into Wii Fit U. Exercises are organized by category and by the amount of requisite exertion, measured in numerical values called "MET".

Wii Fit U can display output on a television screen or only use its GamePad touchscreen. All retail copies of Wii Fit U are bundled with a foldable Wii U GamePad Stand and an activity meter (pedometer) called the Fit Meter, also available separately, which is carried while jogging or otherwise moving. The concept and overall design of the device are similar to the Pokéwalker released with Pokémon HeartGold and SoulSilver. When the Fit Meter is placed near the GamePad, its data is transferred via infrared connection to the Wii U.

Wii Fit U has all the exercises from Wii Fit Plus except the following:

- Segway Circuit
- Rhythm Parade
- Big Top Juggling
- Skateboard Arena
- Tightrope Tension
- Penguin Slide
- Snowboard Slalom
- Lotus Focus

As well as merging the regular and Plus versions of Table Tilt, Balance Bubble, and Basic Run into single entries.

Wii Fit U adds the following exercises:

- Dance
  - Beginner Dance
  - Hula Dance
  - Jazz Dance
  - Hip-Hop
  - Locking
  - Flamenco
  - Salsa
  - Burning Beats/Stamina Steps
- Aerobics
  - Puzzle Squash
  - Free Boxing
  - Orienteering
  - Rowing Crew
- Balance Games
  - Ultimate Obstacle Course
  - Dessert Course
  - Hosedown
  - Trampoline Target
  - Core Luge
  - Scuba Search
  - Climbing

== Release ==
The game became available for purchase, in standard and Wii Balance Board bundles with Fit Meters, in December 2013 in the PAL regions and on January 10, 2014, in North America. In Japan the physical copy became available on February 1, 2014, although it had been released previously on the eShop than in North America and the PAL regions.

== Reception ==
=== Critical reception ===
Reception

Aggregate scores
Aggregator	Score
Metacritic	72/100
OpenCritic	54% recommend

Review scores
Publication	Score
Destructoid	7/10
IGN	7.5/10
Joystiq	2.5/5
Nintendo Life	8/10
Nintendo World Report	9/10
Polygon	4.5/10

Wii Fit U, overall, was well received by critics, having a score of 72 out of 100 by 19 critics on Metacritic. One Metacritic review described it as being "friendly" and not "as hardcore as some fitness buffs may like." Fellow review aggregator OpenCritic assessed that the game received strong approval, being recommended by 54% of critics. Nintendo World Report praises the game for revolutionizing the exercising genre of video games by building upon its predecessor Wii Fit with "robust and customizable routines" and the gym community for motivation. Gaming magazine Polygon criticizes Wii Fit U as "too light-weight to be a contender" for actual exercise. Lifewire called it an "[i]nteresting use of the Gamepad [with] clever new mini-games [and an] improved fitness routine setup [compared to Wii Fit]". PC Magazine rated it 4 out of 5 or "excellent", calling it engaging and fun with many activities, as a worthy sequel and fitness tool. The New York Times described the game and its physical setup as efficient, unobtrusive, and motivating—concluding that "it's cheaper than joining a gym and it beats sitting on the couch and playing video games". US Gamer said that "[b]alance exercises are the most 'game-like' of all the activities", and that the game has solid integration with Nintendo's now-defunct Miiverse social network. Giving it a 4.5 out of 5, US Gamer concluded "Wii Fit U is a very solid package that achieves its primary goal of making you more aware of your fitness, how your body works and what you might need to do to make it work better. Its game-like nature and Nintendo charm keeps it interesting, enjoyable and never demoralizing."

=== Benefits studies ===
Wii Fit U, unlike Wii Fit, has been used for treatments in physical therapy and not just for basic exercise. The Centers for Disease Control and Prevention (CDC) has used games that involve light to moderate activity in those with brain damage to aid in the patient's recovery. Research has found that users feel a better sense of balance and upper body motion, initiating a healing for those with brain injury.

Concerning basic exercise, one study found that Wii Fit U is not fit for intensive exercise but rather moderate exercise and conditioning. The study concluded that the ability of the game's diverse exercises to increase physical growth is unknown.
