= Nintendo Wi-Fi Connection =

Online multiplayer gaming service (2005–2014)

- Developer: Nintendo
- Launched: November 14, 2005; 21 years ago
- Discontinued: May 20, 2014; 12 years ago
- Platforms: Wii; Nintendo DS; Nintendo DS Lite; Nintendo DSi; Nintendo DSi XL; Wii U (Wii mode); Nintendo 3DS (DS games)
- Operating systems: Wii system software, DSi system software
- Status: Defunct, revived unofficially
- Website: www.nintendowifi.com (archive index)

Nintendo Wi-Fi Connection (Note: ニンテンドーWi-Fiコネクション (Japanese: Nintendō Wi-Fi Konekushon)) (sometimes shortened to Nintendo WFC) was an online multiplayer gaming service run by Nintendo that formerly provided free online play in compatible Nintendo DS and Wii games. Launched on November 14, 2005, the service included the company's Wii Shop Channel and DSi Shop game download services. It also ran other features for the Wii and Nintendo DS systems.

Games designed to take advantage of Nintendo Wi-Fi Connection offered internet play integrated into the game. When promoting this service, Nintendo emphasized the simplicity and speed of starting an online game. For example, in Mario Kart DS, an online game was initiated by selecting the online multiplayer option from the main menu, then choosing whether to play with friends or to play with other players (either in the local region or worldwide) at about the same skill level. After a selection was made, the game started searching for an available player.

On January 26, 2012, Nintendo Wi-Fi Connection was succeeded by the Nintendo Network. This online system unified the 3DS and Wii U platforms and replaced Friend Codes, while providing paid downloadable content, an online community style multiplayer system, and personal accounts. On May 20, 2014, Nintendo shut down Nintendo Wi-Fi Connection, except for Nintendo Wi-Fi Connection Pay & Play branded games for the Nintendo DSi Shop and Wii Shop Channel services, both of which were shut down separately in 2017 and 2019. After the service's closure, there have been various fan-made services to restore online functionality to games that Nintendo Wi-Fi Connection supported that remain operational, most notably Wiimmfi.

== Launch ==
On November 14, 2005, Nintendo Wi-Fi Connection was deployed with the release of Mario Kart DS. Having been developed under the direct supervision of president Satoru Iwata, Nintendo's Takao Ohara lamented that Nintendo's long history of online strategies had each quit due to unexpectedly insufficient user bases, but that Nintendo WFC had in four months garnered 2.9 million connections from over one million unique users. To achieve the goal of a truly sustainable online user base with the most-used network service in the world, Ohara described a new strategy for identifying and relieving four main barriers. The proposed four barriers are difficult setup procedures, the psychological barrier preventing newcomers from joining in games, the unpleasantness of receiving abuse from other players, and the cost barrier. The company's proposed online strategy at this point was called "simple, safe, free". Nintendo believed that the online platform's success directly propelled the commercial success of the entire Nintendo DS platform. Nintendo Wi-Fi Connection then served as part of the basis of what would become the Wii.

== Nintendo Wi-Fi Connection architecture ==
System	Wii	Nintendo DSi/DSi XL	Nintendo DS/Lite
Accounts	Friend Code System; Individual Miis (up to 100 at a time); Friend List (up to 100 friends)	Individual account	
Games	Online multiplayer; Pay & Play (downloadable content); Online leaderboards; WiiConnect24; Game-exclusive channels	Online multiplayer; Online leaderboards	
Communication	WiiConnect24; Wii Message Board; Wii Speak Channel; Everybody Votes Channel; Check Mii Out Channel (Mii Contest Channel in PAL region); Friend List; Cross connectivity with Nintendo DS/DSi/3DS	PictoChat (Wireless LAN communication only); Facebook (direct photo upload); DS Download Play; Wii cross connectivity	PictoChat (Wireless LAN communication only); DS Download Play; Wii cross connectivity
Online Shop	Wii Shop Channel	Nintendo DSi Shop	—N/a
Entertainment	Netflix (North America and Europe only); Hulu Plus (United States only); YouTube Channel (North America and Europe only); LOVEFiLM Channel (United Kingdom only); Amazon Video Channel (United States only); BBC iPlayer (United Kingdom only); Television Friend Channel (Japan only); Digicam Print Channel (Japan only); Demae Channel (Japan only); Today and Tomorrow Channel (Japan and PAL region only)	Flipnote Studio; Flipnote Hatena	—N/a
Commercial	Nintendo Channel	Nintendo Zone	—N/a
Internet Navigation	Opera based Internet Browser (w/ Flash video and audio support on Wii); Integrated Google/Yahoo search engine		DS browser sold separately, not supported on DSi
Loyalty Program	Club Nintendo		
Other Utilities	Parental controls; Online game instruction manuals; Nintendo Customer Service (video game console warranty and damage/help support); Nintendo Online Store		
System Update	Wii System Update	Nintendo DSi System Update	—N/a

Services and apps discontinued before May 20, 2014:

- Wii no Ma - ceased operations on April 30, 2012.
- Kirby TV Channel - ceased operations in October 2012.
- As Nintendo terminated the WiiConnect24 service worldwide on June 28, 2013, the following Wii Channels were consequently closed:
  - Nintendo Channel
  - Forecast Channel
  - News Channel
  - Check Mii Out Channel
  - Everybody Votes Channel
  - Digicam Print Channel
- Flipnote Studio was replaced by Flipnote Studio 3D on June 1, 2013, and its online services for both Flipnote Studio and Flipnote Studio 3D shut down following the secession of Hatena Co. Ltd.
- The Pokémon Global Link for fifth generation Pokémon games - phased out between October 1, 2013, and January 14, 2014.

== General features ==
Nintendo Wi-Fi Connection was developed to be easy to connect to, safe for anyone to use, and free of charge. Games designed to take advantage of Nintendo Wi-Fi Connection offered Internet play integrated into the game. The Nintendo Wi-Fi Connection supported up to sixteen players on the Nintendo DS and thirty-two players on the Wii. Basic features of the Wi-Fi Connection included worldwide matchmaking, leaderboards, and tournaments. Additional features were available to friends who exchanged Friend Codes.

=== Friend Codes ===
Each game that used Nintendo Wi-Fi Connection generated a unique twelve-digit Friend Code that could be exchanged with friends and be used to maintain individual friend lists in each game. Though certain games could be played online without a Friend Code, a Friend Code was required to play with a specific person. Friend Codes were generated from an identifier unique to a copy of a game and the Nintendo Wi-Fi Connection ID of a DS or Wii system. Using a different copy of a game or loading the same copy in a different system generated a new Friend Code. If users wanted to become "Friends", they had to mutually add Friend Codes and be authenticated as Friends once both of them were online. Nintendo introduced these features as conscious steps to preserve users' privacy. If a DS or Wii game was sold, but not the system, there was no risk of the purchaser impersonating the seller. If a user needed to replace his or her DS system, then the old system's Nintendo Wi-Fi Connection ID could be transferred wirelessly, in order to maintain the user's original Friend Codes on the new machine. Some games required that the user use Friend Codes to use any online functionality.

Many games have additional features that are enabled between registered friends. These may include customized matchmaking options, cooperative play, friend lists, text chat, and voice chat. Certain Wii games use the 16-digit Wii Number to share some data passively between mutually registered users via WiiConnect24 instead of using independent Friend Codes. Although some of these games may use both the 16-digit Wii Number and its own 12-digit Friend Code, depending on whether the online connectivity requires either passive data-sharing or active multiplayer respectively.

Through internal design documents inadvertently leaked in May 2020, Nintendo had chosen to use the 12-digit Friend Codes over more common screen names as the company feared that there could be conflict with people with the same screen name, and it would be potentially easy to guess at a person's screen name, which created issues with privacy concerns.

== System features ==
While the DS's firmware predated Nintendo Wi-Fi Connection, the Wii and DSi featured more robust internet connectivity, in addition to software patches.

=== Pay & Play ===
In 2008, Nintendo announced a new feature for the Wi-Fi Connection called Pay & Play. Games that used the Pay & Play feature had additional downloadable content (DLC) or services that required extra fees. These fees were paid for using Nintendo Points. A special red Wi-Fi Connection logo with the words "Pay & Play" was used to distinguish these games from the regular Wi-Fi accessible games.

The first games to feature Pay & Play were released in Japan as part of WiiWare on March 25, 2008. Final Fantasy Crystal Chronicles: My Life as a King, Kotoba no Puzzle Mojipittan Wii and Lonpos each had downloadable content available for 100 to 800 Wii Points. The first retail Wii titles to feature Pay & Play functionality are Samba de Amigo, Guitar Hero World Tour and Rock Band 2.

=== WiiConnect24 ===
WiiConnect24 is a defunct service that allowed the system to be connected to the Internet even when the console was in standby mode. Games and channels that utilized WiiConnect24 could send and receive data even while the game was not being played. Players who wished to send data to friends only needed to register each other's Wii System Code and not individual Friend Codes. Players could also send messages to their friends using WiiConnect24 from the Wii Message Board. It was shut down on June 28, 2013. When a message was received, the Wii's disc slot glowed blue. WiiConnect24 was succeeded by SpotPass on the 3DS and Wii U.

=== BBC iPlayer ===
On April 9, 2008, the BBC announced that its online BBC iPlayer would be available on the Wii via the Internet Channel browser. Some users experienced difficulties with the service. On November 18, 2009, BBC iPlayer on the Wii was relaunched as the BBC iPlayer Channel, which was free to download from the Wii Shop Channel. The service was only available to users in the United Kingdom. On February 10, 2015, the BBC announced on their website that they had removed BBC iPlayer from the Wii Shop Channel and terminated the service on the Wii due to resource limitations and infrastructure changes.

=== Wii Shop Channel ===
The Wii Shop Channel is a defunct online storefront that allowed users to download games and other software by redeeming Wii Points, which could be obtained by purchasing Nintendo Points cards from retail outlets or directly through the Wii Shop Channel using a MasterCard or Visa debit or credit card. Users could browse in the Virtual Console, WiiWare, or Wii Channels sections for downloads. A feature to purchase downloaded software as gifts for others became available worldwide on December 10, 2007. Additional channels that were not released at the console's launch were available for purchase in the Wii Shop Channel. These include the Internet Channel, Everybody Votes Channel, Check Mii Out Channel, Nintendo Channel, Netflix Channel, Hulu Plus Channel and the Japan-only Television Friend Channel. all downloadable channels were free of charge. Nintendo announced the purchase and redemption of Wii Points would be disabled on March 26, 2018, and then shut down the channel on January 30, 2019, similar to the DSi Shop two years earlier.

=== Virtual Console ===
The Virtual Console portion of the Wii Shop Channel specialized in older software originally designed and released for home entertainment platforms that are older, in order to make them more accessible on newer platforms. These games are played on the Wii through emulation of older hardware. This hardware included the NES/Famicom, SNES/Super Famicom, Nintendo 64, Sega Genesis/Mega Drive, Sega Master System/Mark III, Neo Geo, TurboGrafx-16/PC Engine, Commodore 64, and arcade games (referred to under the Virtual Console Arcade branding). The prices were generally the same in almost every region and are determined primarily by the software's original platform. The Wii version of this service was discontinued when the Wii Shop Channel was shut down on January 31, 2019.

=== WiiWare ===
The WiiWare section of the Wii Shop Channel specialized in downloadable software specifically designed for the Wii, and usually for lower-budget games. The first WiiWare games were made available on March 25, 2008, in Japan. The WiiWare platform was launched in North America on May 12, 2008, and in Europe and Australia on May 20, 2008.

The WiiWare section was touted as a forum to provide developers with small budgets to release smaller-scale games without the investment and risk of creating a title to be sold at retail (somewhat similar to the Xbox Live Arcade and the PlayStation Store). While actual games have been planned to appear in this section since its inception, there had been no official word on when any would be appearing until June 27, 2007, when Nintendo made an official confirmation in a press release which revealed the first titles would surface sometime in 2008. According to Nintendo, "The remarkable motion controls will give birth to fresh takes on established genres, as well as original ideas that currently exist only in developers' minds."

=== Nintendo DSi Shop ===
The Nintendo DSi Shop is a defunct online storefront exclusive to the Nintendo DSi and Nintendo DSi XL systems, where people could download DSiWare games and applications. Nintendo announced that the Nintendo DSi Shop would be officially shut down on March 31, 2017, after it disabled the purchase of additional Nintendo DSi Points on September 30, 2016. The availability of DSiWare games and apps on the Nintendo eShop was discontinued with the eShop's closure for the Nintendo 3DS on March 27, 2023.

=== Flipnote Hatena ===
Flipnote Hatena was the online portion of the notetaking/animation creation app Flipnote Studio for the Nintendo DSi. It was discontinued on May 31, 2013.

=== Netflix ===
The Nintendo Wii received Netflix on March 27, 2010. It was only for American and Canadian owners, but a Netflix disc was required. As of October 18, 2010, American and Canadian Wii owners could watch Netflix instantly as a channel without requiring a disc.

Netflix was discontinued for the Wii on January 30, 2019.

=== Internet Browser ===
The Nintendo Wii, DS and DSi can surf the Internet with a downloadable browser. The Nintendo Wii and DSi browsers are powered by Opera, but the Nintendo 3DS browser is powered by NetFront. The Nintendo DS's web browser, also powered by Opera, requires a cartridge and a RAM expansion through the GBA port.

=== Forecast Channel ===
The Forecast Channel first became available on December 19, 2006, and was shut down on June 28, 2013, due to the discontinuation of WiiConnect24 which it required. The Forecast Channel allowed weather reports and forecasts to be shown on the console from the Internet via the WiiConnect24 service. The Forecast Channel displayed a view of the Earth as a user-spinnable globe (courtesy of NASA), with which users could view weather in other regions. When fully zoomed out, an accurate star map was visible in the background. The Big Dipper and the constellation Orion are easily recognizable, for example. The Forecast Channel features included the current forecast, the UV index, today's overall forecast, tomorrow's forecast, a 5-day forecast (only for the selected country you live in), and a laundry check (Japan only). Certain games like Madden NFL 07, Nights: Journey of Dreams, and Mario & Sonic at the Olympic Winter Games could use the Forecast Channel to simulate weather conditions depending on the player's region.

=== News Channel ===
The News Channel allows users to access news headlines and current news events obtained from the Internet. News articles are available on a globe view similar to the Forecast Channel, and as a slide show. The content was automatically updated and viewable via WiiConnect24 with clickable news images supported. It, as with WiiConnect24, was shut down on June 28, 2013.

The News Channel became available in North America, Europe, and Australia on January 26, 2007.

Starting with the August 6, 2007 update, the News Channel showed a news ticker in the Wii Menu. However, not visiting the channel for a period of time would result in the ticker not appearing until the channel is viewed. A December 20, 2007 update only released in PAL regions increased the number of news feeds to the channel, sourced from a larger number of news resources and agencies, providing more news that is available per country. As with the Forecast Channel, the News Channel is not available in South Korea. The News Channel was shut down on June 28, 2013, along with the Forecast Channel, due to both channels requiring the discontinued WiiConnect24 service.

=== Everybody Votes Channel ===
The Everybody Votes Channel allowed users to vote in simple opinion polls and compare and contrast opinions with those of friends, family, and people across the globe.

Everybody Votes Channel was launched on February 13, 2007, and was available in the Wii Channels section of the Wii Shop Channel. The application allowed Wii owners to vote on various questions using their Mii as a registered voter. Additionally, voters could also make predictions for the choice that would be the most popular overall after their own vote had been cast. Each Mii's voting and prediction record was tracked and voters could also view how their opinions compared to others. Whether the Mii was correct in its predictions or not, it was displayed on a statistics page, along with a counter of how many times that Mii voted. Up to six Miis could be registered to vote on the console. The channel was free to download. Each player could make a suggestion for a poll a day. Everybody Votes Channel was shut down on June 28, 2013, as with the other channels.

=== LoveFilm Channel ===
On December 4, 2012, a LoveFilm channel was available to download in the UK. It was discontinued on October 31, 2017.

=== YouTube Channel ===
The YouTube channel allowed the user to view YouTube videos on the television screen and has the ability to sign into an existing YouTube account. The YouTube channel was only available in the North American and Australian versions of the Wii system, with the North American release on November 15, 2012, only three days before the Wii U was released in North America.

The YouTube Channel was discontinued on June 30, 2017, due to Google terminating legacy support for all Flash-based YouTube apps on that date.

=== Check Mii Out Channel ===
The Check Mii Out Channel (also known as the Mii Contest Channel and the WatchMii Channel) was a channel that allowed players to share their Miis and enter them into popularity contests. It was first available on November 11, 2007. It was available free to download from the Wii Channels section of the Wii Shop Channel.

Users could post their own Miis in the Posting Plaza, or import other user-submitted Miis to their own personal Mii Parade. Each submitted Mii was assigned a 12-digit entry number to aid in searching. Submitted Miis were given 2 initials by their creator and a notable skill/talent to aid in sorting.

In the Contests section, players could submit their own Miis to compete in contests to best fit a certain description (e.g. Mario without his cap). After the time period for sending a Mii has expired, the user had the choice of voting for three Miis featured on the judging panel, with ten random Miis being shown at a time. Once the judging period is over, the results of the contest could be viewed. Their selection and/or submission's popularity in comparison to others was displayed, as well as the winning Mii and user.

The Check Mii Out Channel sent messages to the Wii Message Board concerning recent contests. Participants in certain contests could add their user and submitted Mii to a photo with a background related to the contest theme. This picture could then be sent to the Wii Message Board. The Check Mii Out Channel was shut down on June 28, 2013, as with Wiiconnect24.

=== Television Friend Channel ===
The Television Friend Channel allowed users to check what programs were on the television. Content was provided by Guide Plus. A "stamp" feature allowed users to mark programs of interest with a Mii-themed stamp. If an e-mail address or mobile phone number was registered in the address book, the channel could send out an alert 30 minutes prior to the start of the selected program. The channel tracked the stamps of all Wii users and allowed users to rate programs on a five-star scale. Additionally, when the channel is active, the Wii Remote could be used to change the TV's volume and channel so that users could tune into their shows by way of the channel. The Television Friend Channel launched in Japan on March 4, 2008, and was discontinued on July 24, 2011, due to the shutdown of analog television broadcasts in Japan. It did not launch outside Japan, as most countries, unlike Japan, have a guide built into set-top boxes and/or TVs.

=== Digicam Print Channel ===
The Digicam Print Channel was a channel developed in collaboration with Fujifilm that allowed users to import their digital photos from an SD card and place them into templates for printable photo books and business cards through a software wizard. The user was also able to place their Mii on a business card. The completed design was then sent online to Fujifilm which printed and delivered the completed product to the user. The processing of individual photos was also available.

The Digicam Print Channel became available from July 23, 2008, in Japan. It was planned to be available in Europe, Australia, and North America, but was never released in those regions. It was shut down on June 28, 2013.

=== Today and Tomorrow Channel ===
The Today and Tomorrow Channel became available in Japan on December 2, 2008, and in Europe, Australia, and South Korea on September 9, 2009. The channel was developed in collaboration with Media Kobo and allowed users to view fortunes for up to six Miis across five categories: love, work, study, communications, and money. The channel also featured a compatibility test that compared two Miis, and it also gave out "lucky words" that had to be interpreted by the user. The channel used Mii birthdate data, but users had to input a birth year whenever they were loaded onto the channel.

=== Wii Room Channel ===
A video-on-demand service channel was released in Japan on May 1, 2009. The channel was a joint venture between Nintendo and Japanese advertising agency Dentsu. The channel's interface was built around a virtual living room, where up to 8 Miis can be registered and interact with each other. The virtual living room contained a TV which takes the viewer to the video list. Celebrity "concierge" Miis occasionally introduced special programming.

=== Demae Channel ===
A food delivery service channel was released in Japan on May 26, 2009, and was discontinued on March 31, 2017. The channel was a joint venture between Nintendo and Japanese online food delivery portal service Demae-can. The channel offered a wide range of foods provided by different food delivery companies which can be ordered directly through the Wii Channel. A note was posted to the Wii Message Board containing what had been ordered and the total price. The food was then delivered to the address the Wii user has registered on the channel.

=== Nintendo Channel ===
The Nintendo Channel (known as the Everybody's Nintendo Channel in Japan) was a Channel for the Wii. It was launched in Japan on November 27, 2007, in North America on May 7, 2008, and in Europe and Australia on May 30, 2008, and was shut down on June 28, 2013. It allowed Wii users to watch videos such as interviews, trailers, commercials, and download demos for the Nintendo DS. In this capacity, the channel worked in a similar way to the DS Download Station. The channel provided game info pages and users could rate games that they had played. A search feature was also available to assist users in finding new games to try or buy. The channel had the ability to take the user directly into the Wii Shop Channel for buying the wanted game immediately. The Nintendo Channel was updated with different Nintendo DS demos and new videos every week; the actual day of the week varied across different international regions.

An updated version of the Nintendo Channel was released in Japan on July 15, 2009, North America on September 14, 2009, and in Europe on December 15, 2009. The update introduced a new interface and additional features, options, and statistics for users to view. However, the European version was missing some of these new additional features, such as options for choosing video quality. In addition, a weekly show known as Nintendo Week began airing exclusively on the North American edition of the channel, while another weekly show called Nintendo TV was available on the UK version of the channel.

=== Mario Kart Channel ===
Mario Kart Wii allowed players to install the Mario Kart Channel on their Wii console. The channel can work without inserting the Mario Kart Wii disc into the console, but to compete in races and time trials the disc was required. The use of the Mario Kart Channel allowed for a number of options. A ranking option lets players see their best Time Trial scores for each track and compare their results to those of their friends and other players worldwide, represented by their Miis. Players will have the option of racing against random or selective ghosts, or improving their results gradually by taking on the ghosts of rivals, those with similar race times. Users had the option to submit these times for others around the world to view. Players could also manage and register friends using the channel and see if any of them were currently online.

Another feature that the channel offered was Tournaments, where Nintendo would regularly invite players to challenges in which a certain objective must be completed in the fastest time possible similar to the missions mode found in the 2005 DS game Mario Kart DS. Players were also able to compare their competition rankings with those of other players.

== Wii Message Board ==
The Message Board's online connectivity is now defunct, along with the shutdown of its foundational WiiConnect24 service. It allowed users to leave messages for friends, family members, or other users on a calendar-based message board. Users could also use WiiConnect24 to trade messages and pictures with other Wii owners, conventional email accounts (email pictures to the console, but not pictures to email), and mobile phones (through text messages). Each Wii had an individual Wii.com email account containing the Wii Number. Before trading messages, it was necessary to add and approve contacts in the address book, although the person added would not get a notification of the request. The service also alerted all users of incoming game-related information.

The Wii Message Board was available for users to post messages that are available to other Wii users by usage of Wii Numbers with the now-defunct WiiConnect24. In addition to writing text, players could also include images from an SD card in the body of messages, as well as attach a Mii to the message. Announcements of software updates and video game news were posted by Nintendo. The Message Board could be used for posting memos for oneself or for family members without going online. These messages could then be put on any day of the calendar. The Wii Message Board could also be updated automatically by a real-time game like Animal Crossing: City Folk.

=== Wii Speak ===
Users with the Wii Speak peripheral were able to access the Wii Speak Channel. Users could join one of four rooms (with no limit to the number of people in each room) to chat with each other online. Each user was represented by their Mii, which lip-syncs to their spoken words. In addition, users could also leave audio messages for other users by sending their message to their Wii Message Board. Users could also share photo slide shows and comment on them. The Wii Speak Channel became available in North America and Europe on December 5, 2008.

== Games ==
The first Wi-Fi Connection games were Mario Kart DS and Tony Hawk's American Sk8land for the Nintendo DS, released on November 14, 2005, and November 16, 2005, respectively, followed by Animal Crossing: Wild World in Japan on November 23 and in North America on December 5. The first Wii Wi-Fi Connection games were released in 2006 in Japan and in 2007 overseas. In Japan and North America the first game was Pokémon Battle Revolution. In Europe, Australia, and New Zealand the first game was Mario Strikers Charged.

There were over 100 Wii games, 25 WiiWare games, 93 Nintendo DS games, and 4 Nintendo DSiWare games available worldwide that supported Nintendo Wi-Fi Connection.

Since May 20, 2014, at 10:30 pm EST, it is no longer possible to download additional content for games, as the Nintendo Wi-Fi Connection service was discontinued on that date.

== Connection options ==
=== Nintendo DS ===
The Nintendo DS has an 802.11 wireless adapter built in allowing the DS to access the service via a compatible wireless network. Support for 802.11b clients must be offered by an access point for a DS to be able to connect to it. Public hotspots that use a captive portal can be accessed after login using the Nintendo DS Browser.

Before the release of the Nintendo DSi, neither consoles nor games could support security protocols more advanced than WEP. Even after the Nintendo DSi's release, only online-enabled games made exclusively or enhanced for usage on this console iteration were able to support the Nintendo DSi's native online connection. This extended to the Nintendo 3DS as well, conditional on the console's native online connection setting being the same as the Nintendo DSi, as other advanced settings were also unsupported.

=== Wii ===
The Wii has an 802.11b/g wireless adapter built-in. Due to flaws in its implementation, however, it is only capable of working when the 802.11 (legacy mode) basic rates of 1 Mbit/s and 2 Mbit/s are advertised by an access point. This means that 802.11b support must be offered on an access point for a Wii to be able to connect to it. It is compatible with WEP, WPA with TKIP or CCMP, and WPA2 with CCMP. The Wii is also AOSS compatible as of the 3.0 system update. The connection settings allow players to configure access to and save settings for up to three different networks. Connection settings can be detected automatically or entered manually. The Wii does not have an Ethernet port built in, but can be connected via wired LAN with a USB Ethernet adapter available from Nintendo and third parties.

=== Nintendo Wi-Fi USB Connector ===
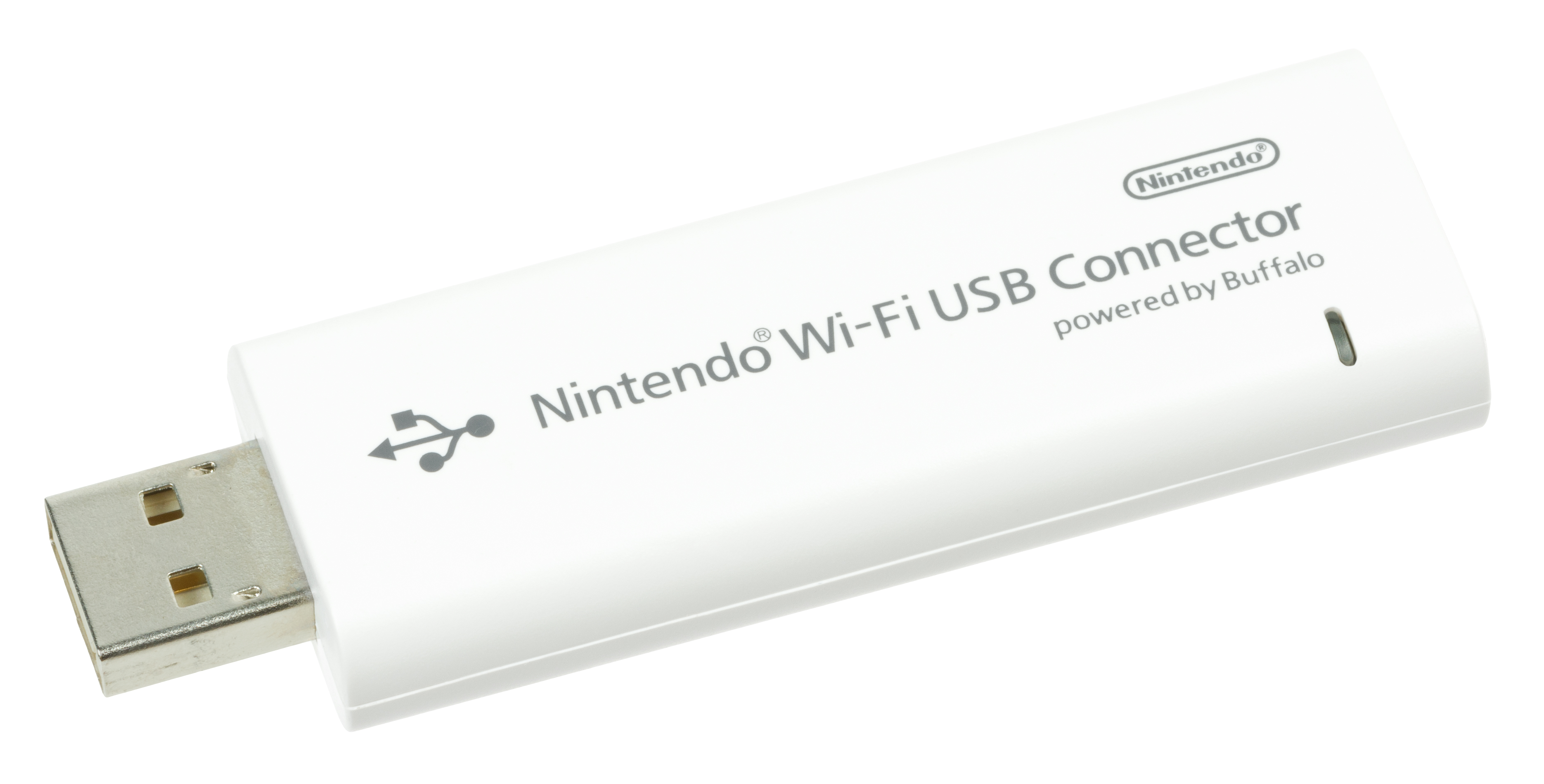
The Nintendo Wi-Fi USB Connector

If a compatible wireless network is not available, the Nintendo DS and Wii can also be connected through the Nintendo Wi-Fi USB Connector. Broadband Internet access is not required to make use of this connectivity, though it is recommended to reduce network latency. It was priced at the Nintendo Online Store, however it has since been discontinued due to legal issues. Its replacement, the Nintendo Wi-Fi network adapter, and many third-party products, provide similar functionality.

=== Hotspots ===
Nintendo worked with hotspot providers to allow free access in public for Nintendo DS users. In 2005, Nintendo agreed with Texas-based firm Wayport, Inc. to provide access in McDonald's restaurants in the U.S. However, the deal was not renewed and has since expired in late 2007. A similar partnership with FatPort to create free hotspots in Canada was announced by Nintendo of Canada on October 19, 2005.

In 2006 former Director of Marketing for Nintendo of Europe Jim Merrick announced that Nintendo was planning total of 25,000 hotspots in Europe, with 7,500 in the UK alone thanks to a partnership with The Cloud and BT Openzone.

Nintendo of Australia initially announced on November 17, 2005, that they would roll out only 26 hotspots across the country, in partnership with selected EB Games, Myer and Dick Smith Powerhouse stores. On April 14, 2007, Nintendo announced that over one thousand additional free hotspots had been added in a partnership with Telstra Wireless, providing access in selected hotels, airports, Starbucks cafes, and McDonald's restaurants.

Hotspot providers with free access to Nintendo DS users
Telstra Wireless (Australia); FatPort (Canada); Meteor Networks (France); T-Com (Germany); EB Games (Australia); ForthNet (Greece); Linkem (Italy); OTE (Greece)	T-Mobile Netherlands (Netherlands); PT-WiFi (Portugal); Telefónica Zonas ADSL (Spain); The Cloud (UK); BT Openzone (UK & Ireland); MWgames (Australia); JiWire (USA)

== Official website ==
When the service launched in 2005, Nintendo created the official Nintendo Wi-Fi Connection website as a portal for users looking to access the service or who were in need of troubleshooting assistance. The website had live statistics and data from the service's servers and recorded high scores and service status. It also allowed a user to link their Nintendo DS Wi-Fi Connection ID to a My Nintendo account.

In November 2008, the site was merged into a subsection of the Games section on the official Nintendo website.

In preparation for the shutdown of the Nintendo Wi-Fi Connection, Nintendo removed the subsection on its website before May 20, 2014.

== Termination and effects ==
Nintendo Wi-Fi Connection was shut down on May 20, 2014 for all Wii and DS games. Online play features incorporated into these games are no longer available without homebrew. The shutdown was connected to the shutdown of multiplayer services by GameSpy, who were acquired by Glu Mobile in 2012. 3DS and Wii U games were not affected by the shutdown because their multiplayer platform used Nintendo's own infrastructure instead of a third-party service. The Wii Shop Channel, third-party video services, and the Pay & Play services have been shut down as of February 1, 2019. Users can continue to redownload previously purchased content from the Wii Shop Channel and use the Wii U Transfer Tool to transfer Wii data from a Wii to a Wii U, and download the save data update channel for The Legend of Zelda: Skyward Sword to patch the game.

The shutdown had an immediate effect on all Nintendo-published Wii and Nintendo DS titles. However, it may not necessarily apply to certain third-party titles, which could have separate servers running their own games' online functions. For example, Electronic Arts revealed that some of the games they published on the Wii and Nintendo DS had their online support terminated on June 30, 2014.

A small selection of online-enabled Wii games, such as newer FIFA games and Dragon Quest X, which are not branded under the Nintendo Wi-Fi Connection, may continue using their online functions normally. Starting in 2015, various Wii and Nintendo DS games were digitally re-released, including those which formerly supported Nintendo Wi-Fi Connection.

After the shutdown, there have been various third-party fan revival services to restore online functionality to games that Nintendo Wi-Fi Connection supported that remain operational, such as Wiimmfi, WiiLink WFC and AltWFC.

Wiimmfi is a free private server that replicates the Nintendo Wi-Fi Connection's functionality. It has been available to the public since May 10, 2014 (10 days before the Nintendo WFC shutdown) and continues to be operational. It started as a replacement server for Mario Kart Wii, one of the most popular games played in the service, and the most popular title played on Wiimmfi.

== See also ==
- Nintendo Network
- Nintendo Switch Online
- WiiConnect24
- PlayStation Network
- Xbox Live
