= Demae Channel =

Food delivery service for the Wii

- Developer: Denyusha
- Publisher: Nintendo
- Release: 26 May 2009
- Genre: Wii Channels

Demae Channel (Note: Japanese: 出前チャンネル; Food Delivery Channel) was a Wii channel that featured a food delivery service developed by Nintendo and Denyusha and operated by Demaecan. It was launched on 26 May 2009, exclusively in Japan, and it was available as a free download on the Wii Shop Channel. In addition, a Wii U version was released on 8 August 2013.

The channel allowed users to order food and drinks from a list of restaurants and shops close to them, have it sent to their homes and pay on delivery. It was shut down on 31 March 2017.

== Overview ==
Upon first startup, users were taken to a menu to input their home address and personal information. After the channel became accessible, orders could then be placed to the input address.

The channel featured a list of food genres users could choose from (pizza, bento, sushi, Japanese food, Chinese food, Western food, curry, party food, desserts, etc.), with an additional roulette option that would pick one at random. Each genre included a list of restaurants, stores and services in a nearby area, district, neighbourhood or village, along with estimated arrival time and opening/closing hours. Once a service was selected, users could pick a product and add extra settings such as size, type, ingredients and toppings. When the order was finished and confirmed, users were expected to pay for it on delivery. A receipt with the ordered product was sent to the console's Wii Message Board.

Additional features included using coupons, adding items to a list of favourites, checking a record of previous orders and requesting new restaurants to be added. According to Demaecan, over a thousand stores were requested through it each month. Demae Channel also had a soundtrack, with a different theme for each menu and food genre, and several campaigns were hosted for it, such as a limited giveaway of miniature reproductions of their delivery bikes and another with Nintendo Points cards.

On 8 August 2013, the service was released as a Wii U application, simply under the company's name, Demaecan. (Note: Japanese: 出前館; Demae-kan) As opposed to the original Wii version, which had an original design and menus, the Wii U release simply accesses the company's website.

=== Shutdown ===
Because the service did not use WiiConnect24, Demae Channel continued to work after this service was discontinued. However, both versions were announced to be removed from the Wii Shop Channel and the Nintendo eShop on 22 February 2017, and the service was finally discontinued on 31 March 2017.

== Legacy ==
The channel received a lot of interest, mainly from overseas audiences.

In 2020 a group of Wii homebrew developers started a project to make a custom replacement server for Wii no Ma called WiiLink, and in August 2022, support for Demae Channel was added. The revival project allowed access to the channel again, and users in the United States and Canada can order pizza again through a link with the Domino's Pizza service. In April 2023, support for Deliveroo was added, expanding support to more countries, until it ended in September 2023. On April 12, 2026, WiiLink released the Damae Channel for European countries with the Just Eat service.

== See also ==
- Wii Menu
- Wii no Ma
- TV no Tomo Channel
- WiiConnect24
- Everybody Votes Channel
