= Wii system software =

Operating system for the Nintendo Wii

- The system software of the Wii known as the "Wii Menu", as displayed in widescreen (16:9) format
- Developer: Nintendo
- Written in: C, C++, assembly language
- OS family: Nintendo proprietary
- Working state: Discontinued
- Source model: Closed source
- Initial release: 1.0 / November 19, 2006; 19 years ago
- Latest release: 4.3 / June 21, 2010; 16 years ago
- Available in: Chinese (Simplified); Chinese (Traditional); Dutch; English (United Kingdom); English (United States); French (Canada); French (France); German; Italian; Japanese; Korean; Spanish (Latin America); Spanish (Spain)
- Update method: Direct download Game disc
- Supported platforms: Wii, Wii U
- Succeeded by: Wii U system software
- Official website: https://en-americas-support.nintendo.com/app/answers/detail/a_id/2522

Support status
- Unsupported

The Wii system software is the software frontend on the Wii, a home video game console by Nintendo. Updates could be downloaded over the internet or read from a game disc, allowing Nintendo to add additional features, channels and patch security vulnerabilities. When a new update became available, Nintendo sent a message to the Wii Message Board of internet-connected systems notifying them of the available update.

Most game discs, including first-party and third-party games, include system software updates, which allow systems that are not connected to the internet to still receive updates. The system menu will not start such games if their updates have not been installed, and would force users to install updates in order to play these games. Some games, such as online games like Super Smash Bros. Brawl and Mario Kart Wii, contain specific extra updates, such as the ability to receive Wii Message Board posts from game-specific addresses; therefore, these games would require an update to be installed before they could be played on a console for the first time.

== Technology ==
=== IOS ===
The Wii's firmware has many active branches known as IOSes, thought by the Wii homebrew developers to stand for "Input Output Systems" or "Internal Operating Systems". The currently active IOS, also simply referred to as just "IOS," runs on a separate ARM926EJ-S processor unofficially nicknamed Starlet, which resides within the Hollywood GPU. The patent for the Wii U shows a similar device which is simply named "Input/Output Processor". IOS controls I/O between the code running on the main Broadway processor and the various Wii hardware that does not also exist on the GameCube.

Except for bug fixes, new IOS versions do not replace existing IOS versions. Instead, Wii consoles have multiple IOS versions installed. All native Wii software (including games distributed on Nintendo optical discs, the System Menu itself, Virtual Console games, WiiWare, and Wii Channels), with the exception of certain homebrew applications, have the IOS version hardcoded into the software.

When the software is run, the IOS that is hardcoded gets loaded by the Wii, which then loads the software itself. If that IOS does not exist on the Wii, in the case of disc-based software, it would be installed automatically with a system update (after the user is prompted). With downloaded software, this should not theoretically happen, as the user cannot access the shop to download software unless the player has all the IOS versions that they require. However, if homebrew is used to forcefully install or run a piece of software when the required IOS does not exist, the user is redirected to the system menu.

Nintendo created this system so that new updates would not unintentionally break compatibility with older games, but it does have the side effect that it uses up space on the Wii's internal NAND Flash memory. IOSes are referred to by their number, which can theoretically be between 3 and 255, although many numbers are skipped, presumably being development versions that were never completed.

Only one IOS version can run at any given time. The only time an IOS is not running is when the Wii enters GameCube backward compatibility mode, during which the Wii runs a variant of IOS specifically for GameCube games, MIOS, which contains a modified version of the GameCube's IPL. Custom IOSes, called cIOSes, can be installed with homebrew. The main purpose of cIOS is to allow homebrew users to use other homebrew apps such as USB Loader GX (allows games stored in the WBFS file format to be run from a USB stick).

=== User interface ===
The system provides a graphical interface to the Wii's abilities. All games run directly on the Broadway processor, and either directly interface with the hardware (for the hardware common to the Wii and GameCube), or interface with IOS running on the ARM architecture processor (for Wii-specific hardware). The ARM processor does not have access to the screen, and therefore neither does IOS. This means that while a piece of software is running, everything seen on the screen (including the home button menu) comes from that software, and not from any operating system or firmware. Therefore, the version number reported by the Wii is actually only the version number of the System Menu. Some updates do not result in a change of the version number: the System Menu itself is not updated, only system features such as IOSes and channels. As a side effect, it is impossible for Nintendo to implement any functions that would affect the games themselves, for example an in-game system menu (similar to the Xbox 360's in-game Dashboard or the PlayStation 3's in-game XMB).

The Wii Menu (known internally as the System Menu) is the name of the user interface for the Wii game console, and it is the first screen on the system after it starts. It has four pages, each with a 4x3 grid, and each displaying the current time and date. Available applications, known as "channels", are displayed and can be navigated using the pointer capability of the Wii Remote. The grid is customizable; users can move channels (except for the Disc Channel) among the menu's 48 customizable slots. By pressing the plus and minus buttons on the Wii Remote users can scroll across accessing empty slots. Similar to many other video game consoles, the Wii does not feature just games. For example, the Wii has been used to install applications such as Netflix to stream media (without requiring a disc) on the Wii. The Wii Menu let users access both game and no-game functions through built-in applications called Channels, which are designed to represent television channels. There are six primary channels: the Disc Channel, Mii Channel, Photo Channel, Wii Shop Channel, Forecast Channel and News Channel, although the latter two were not initially included and only became available via system updates. Some of the functions provided by these Channels on the Wii were originally limited to a computer, such as a full-featured web browser and digital photo viewer. Users can also use Channels to create and share cartoon-like digital avatars called Miis and download new games and Channels directly from the Wii Shop Channel. New Channels were introduced and downloaded via the Wii Shop Channel, including the Everybody Votes Channel and the Internet Channel. Separate Channels are graphically displayed in a grid and can be navigated using the pointer capability of the Wii Remote. Users can also rearrange these Channels if they are not satisfied with how the Channels are originally organized on the menu.

=== Home Menu ===
Accessed with the Wii Remote's Home button, the Home Menu displays information about the controllers currently being used, and allows the user to configure certain options. At the bottom of the menu screen, the battery life of all connected controllers is displayed. Below that is a bar labeled Wii Remote Settings. Selecting it brings users to an options screen where they can control the audio output volume, rumble settings, and reconnect the controllers, for example to connect Wii Remotes through one-time synchronization. Depending on when the Home Menu is accessed, a different number of buttons are displayed.

Wii Menu: The Wii Menu button is used of the user wants to return to the main menu, which is also seen on the menu itself. Selecting this will exit a game or a Wii Menu channel and return the player to the Wii Menu, where users can choose another channel. When playing certain Virtual Console titles, with the exception of the Nintendo 64 and Neo Geo, this will also create a suspend point.

Reset: In applications and games (both retail and downloadable), the Reset button is available. This performs a soft reset of that particular application, for example returning a game to its title screen or the loading screen of a Wii Menu channel, the same as what would happen if the player were to press the console's physical reset button.

Operations Guide: On Wii Menu channels, including the News Channel, Forecast Channel, Internet Channel, Everybody Votes Channel, certain WiiWare titles and Virtual Console titles, the Operations Guide button appeared on the Home Menu. The guide accessed acts as an instruction manual for the game being played.

The Home Menu can be compared to the Xbox 360's in-game menu (accessed by pressing the "Xbox" button), or the PlayStation 3's mid-game XMB. It may be accessed under most circumstances during Wii operation, which pauses the on-screen action. Otherwise, a "home" symbol with a no symbol on it appears onscreen. It is also inaccessible during Nintendo GameCube play, as the Wii Remote cannot control Nintendo GameCube software.

=== Network features ===
The Wii system supports Wireless connectivity with the Nintendo DS handheld console with no additional accessories. This connectivity allows players to use the Nintendo DS microphone and touchscreen as inputs for select retail games. Pokémon Battle Revolution is the first example of a game using Nintendo DS–Wii connectivity. Nintendo later released the Nintendo Channel for the Wii allowing its users to download game demos or additional data to their Nintendo DS.

Like many other video game consoles, the Wii console is able to connect to the internet, although this is not required for the Wii system itself to function. Each Wii has its own unique 16-digit Wii Code for use with Wii's non-game features. With Internet connection enabled users are able to access the established Nintendo Wi-Fi Connection service. Wireless encryption by WEP, WPA (TKIP/RC4) and WPA2 (CCMP/AES) is supported. AOSS support was added in System Menu version 3.0. As with the Nintendo DS, Nintendo does not charge for playing via the service; the twelve-digit Friend Code system controls how players connect to one another. The service has a few features for the console, including the Virtual Console, WiiConnect24 and several Channels. The Wii console can also communicate and connect with other Wii systems through a self-generated wireless LAN, enabling local wireless multiplayer on different television sets. The system also implements console-based software, including the Wii Message Board. One can connect to the Internet with third-party devices as well.

The Wii console also includes a web browser known as the Internet Channel, which is a version of the Opera 9 browser with menus. It is meant to be a convenient way to access the web on the television screen, although it is far from offering a comfortable user interface compared with modern web browsers. A virtual keyboard pops up when needed for input, and the Wii Remote acts like a mouse, making it possible to click anywhere on the screen and navigate through web links. However, the browser cannot support all the features of most normal web pages, although it supported Adobe Flash and able to play Flash files. Some third-party services such as the online BBC iPlayer were also available on the Wii via the Internet Channel browser, although BBC iPlayer was later relaunched as the separate BBC iPlayer Channel on the Wii. In addition, Internet access including the Internet Channel and system updates may be restricted by the parental controls feature of the Wii.

=== Backward compatibility ===
The original designs of the Nintendo Wii console, more specifically the Wii models made before 2011, were fully backward compatible with GameCube devices including game discs, memory cards and controllers. This was because the Wii hardware had ports for both GameCube memory cards, and peripherals and its slot-loading drive was able to accept and read the previous console's discs. GameCube games work with the Wii without any additional configuration, but a GameCube controller is required to play GameCube titles; neither the Wii Remote or the Classic Controller functions in this capacity. The Wii supports progressive scan output in 480p-enabled GameCube titles. Peripherals can be connected via a set of four GameCube controller sockets and two Memory Card slots (concealed by removable flip-open panels). The console retains connectivity with the Game Boy Advance and e-Reader through the Game Boy Advance Cable, which is used in the same manner as with the GameCube; however, this feature can only be accessed on select GameCube titles which previously utilized it.

There are also a few limitations in the backward compatibility. For example, online and LAN features of certain GameCube games were not available since the Wii does not have serial ports for the GameCube Broadband Adapter and Modem Adapter. The Wii uses a proprietary port for video output, and is incompatible with all GameCube audio/video cables (composite video, S-Video, component video and RGB SCART). The console also does not support the GameCube footprint and high-speed port needed for Game Boy Player. Furthermore, only GameCube functions were available and only compatible memory cards and controllers could be used when playing a GameCube game as the Wii's internal memory would not save GameCube data.

Because of the original device's backward compatibility with earlier Nintendo products players can play older games on the console in addition to newer Wii game titles. However, South Korean units do not include GameCube backward compatibility. Also, the redesigned Wii Family Edition and Wii Mini, launched in 2011 and 2013 respectively, had this compatibility removed. Nevertheless, there is another service called Virtual Console which allow users to download older games from prior Nintendo platforms (namely the Nintendo Entertainment System, Super NES and Nintendo 64) onto their Wii console, as well as games from non-Nintendo platforms such as the Genesis and TurboGrafx-16.

== List of additional Channels ==
This section lists Wii Channels released beyond the four initial Channels (Disc Channel, Mii Channel, Photo Channel and Wii Shop Channel) included in the original consoles. The News Channel and the Forecast Channel were released as part of system updates so separate downloads were not required. As of January 30, 2019, all channels listed below have been discontinued with the exception of the Wii Fit Channel and the Internet Channel.

Additional Wii Channels
New channels added	Regions	Download	Released	Discontinued	Ref.
Amazon Instant Video Channel LoveFilm	(United States) (United Kingdom) (Germany)	✓	January 17, 2013	January 30, 2019	
BBC iPlayer Channel	(United Kingdom)	✓	November 18, 2009	February 10, 2015	
Check Mii Out Channel	(United States) (Japan) (Europe)	✓	November 12, 2007	June 28, 2013	
Crunchyroll Channel	(United States) (Europe)	✓	October 15, 2015	May 5, 2017	
Jam with the Band: Live Channel	(Japan) (Europe)	✓	June 26, 2008	Permanent channel	
Demae Channel	(Japan)	✓	May 26, 2009	March 31, 2017	
Digicam Print Channel	(Japan)	✓	July 23, 2008	June 28, 2013	
Everybody Votes Channel	(United States) (Japan) (Europe)	✓	February 13, 2007	June 28, 2013	
Forecast Channel	(United States) (Japan) (Europe)	✗	December 19, 2006	June 28, 2013	
Hulu Plus Channel	(United States) (Japan)	✓	February 16, 2012	January 30, 2019	
Internet Channel	(United States) (Japan) (Europe)	✓	April 11, 2007	Permanent channel	
Mario Kart Channel	(Japan) (Europe) (United States)	✗	April 10, 2008 - April 27, 2008	Reduced functionality after May 20, 2014	
Metroid Prime 3 Preview Channel	(United States) (Europe)	✓	August 10, 2007	2008	
Netflix Channel	(United States) (Europe)	✓	October 18, 2010 - January 9, 2012	January 30, 2019	
News Channel	(United States) (Japan) (Europe)	✗	January 26, 2007	June 28, 2013	
Nintendo Channel	(United States) (Japan) (Europe)	✓	November 27, 2007 - May 30, 2008	June 28, 2013	
Television Friend Channel	(Japan)	✓	March 4, 2008	July 24, 2011	
Today and Tomorrow Channel	(Japan) (Europe) (South Korea)	✓	December 2, 2008 - September 9, 2009	Permanent channel, no longer obtainable	
Wii Fit Channel	(Japan) (Europe) (United States)	✗ (except (Japan) )	December 1, 2007 - May 21, 2008	Permanent channel	
Wii no Ma	(Japan)	✓	May 1, 2009	April 30, 2012	
Wii Speak Channel	(United States) (Europe)	✓	December 5, 2008	May 20, 2014	
YouTube Channel	(United States) (Europe) (Japan)	✓	November 15, 2012 - December 10, 2012	June 30, 2017	

== Pre-installed channels ==
=== Disc Channel ===
The Disc Channel is the primary way to play Wii and GameCube titles from supported Nintendo optical discs inserted into the console.

Each Wii game disc includes a system update partition, which includes the most recent Wii software from the time the game was released. If a disc that is inserted contains newer software than the one installed on the console, installing the new software will be required to play the game. This allows users without an internet connection to still receive system updates. When loaded into the disc slot, an icon on the Disc Channel that says "Wii System Update" appears. After selecting the channel, the Wii will automatically update. If these updates are not installed, the game will remain unplayable until the update is installed, as each time the channel is loaded with the game inserted, the update prompt will appear, and declining the update will return the player to the Wii Menu instead of starting the game.

Games requiring a system update can still be played without updating using homebrew software, such as Gecko OS or a USB loader.

=== Mii Channel ===
The Mii Channel, the first application used to create and view Mii characters on the Wii

The Mii Channel (Note: Known in Japan as the Nigaoe Channel (似顔絵チャンネル, Nigaoe Chan'neru)) is an avatar creator, where users can design 3D caricatures of people called Miis by selecting from a group of facial and bodily features. At the Game Developers Conference 2007, Shigeru Miyamoto explained that the look and design of the Mii characters are based on Kokeshi, a form of Japanese doll used as souvenir gifts.

A Wired interview of Katsuya Eguchi (producer of Animal Crossing and Wii Sports) held in 2006 confirmed that the custom player avatar feature shown at Nintendo's E3 Media Briefing would be included in the hardware. The feature was described as part of a "profile" system that contains the Mii and other pertinent player information. This application was announced by Nintendo in September 2006. It is incorporated into Wii's operating system interface as the "Mii Channel". Users can select from pre-made Miis or create their own by choosing custom facial shapes, colors, and positioning. In certain games, each player's Mii will serve as the character the player controls in some or all forms of gameplay. Miis created in other Wii consoles can appear on a feature called "Mii Parade" where they appear on their Wii consoles through the WiiConnect24 feature. Early-created Miis as well as those encountered in Mii Parades may also appear as spectators in some games. Miis can be stored on Wii Remotes and used in other Wii consoles. The Wii Remote can hold a maximum of ten Miis.

In addition, Mii characters can be transferred from a user's Wii to Nintendo 3DS consoles, as well as supported Nintendo DS games via the Mii Channel. While in the channel, pressing A, followed by B, then 1, and holding 2 on the Wii Remote allows the user to unlock the feature. The Mii Channel is succeeded by the Mii Maker app for both Nintendo 3DS and Wii U, and the Mii options in Settings for Nintendo Switch.

According to Nintendo president Satoru Iwata, over 160 million Mii characters had been created using the Mii Channel by May 2010.

=== Photo Channel ===
If a user inserts an SD card into the console, or receives photos (JPEG) or videos (MJPEG) via the Wii Message Board, they can be viewed using the Photo Channel. The user can create a slideshow simply by inserting an SD card with photos and, optionally, MP3 or AAC files (see note regarding December 10, 2007 update to version 1.1). The Wii will automatically add Ken Burns effect transitions between the photos and play either the music on the SD card or built-in music in the background. A built-in editor allows users to add markings and effects to their photos or videos (The edits float statically above the videos). Mosaics can also be created with this feature. In "Doodle" mode, the user can draw on or make art on the photos. The "Mood" mode allows the user to make all the photos on these four following effects which is either brightening up the photo, making the photo grayscale, zapping the photo, or cooking up a hard-boiled photo. Puzzles can be created from photos or videos with varying degrees of difficulty (However, the first puzzle the user plays will be six-pieces) with 6, 12, 24 and 48 piece puzzles available, with 192 selectable while holding down 1 on the Wii Remote. Edited photos can be saved to the Wii and sent to other Wiis via the message board. According to the system's manual, the following file extensions and formats are supported: Photos (jpeg/jpg), Movies (mov/avi), and Music (mp3/aac).

JPEG files can be up to 8192x8192 resolution and in baseline format. Video data contained within the .mov or .avi files must be in an OpenDML-compliant MJPEG and use some variant of this format for their videos, with a resolution of up to 848×480 pixels (Wide VGA). Photos, even high resolution ones, are compressed and decreased in resolution.

==== Photo Channel 1.1 ====
Photo Channel 1.1 is an optional update to the Photo Channel that became available on the Wii Shop Channel on December 10, 2007. It allows users to customize the Photo Channel icon on the Wii Menu with photos from an SD card or the Wii Message Board. It also allows playback of songs in random order. The update replaced MP3 support with support for MPEG-4 encoded audio files encoded with AAC in the MP4 extension.

Wii owners who updated to version 1.1 can revert to version 1.0 by deleting it from the channels menu in the data management setup. Consoles released after December 10, 2007, come with the version 1.1 update pre-installed, and cannot be downgraded to version 1.0.

Owners of systems on a Japanese firmware can download a Revert to Photo Channel 1.0 Channel from the Wii Shop Channel if they would like to do so.

=== Wii Shop Channel ===
Wii Shop Channel logo

The Wii Shop Channel allowed users to download games and other software by redeeming Wii Points, which could be obtained by purchasing Nintendo Points cards from retail outlets or directly through the Wii Shop Channel using Mastercard or Visa credit cards online. Users could browse in the Virtual Console, WiiWare, or Wii Channels sections for downloads. A feature to purchase downloaded software as gifts for others became available worldwide on December 10, 2007. Additional channels that were not released at the console's launch were available for purchase in the Wii Shop Channel. These included: Internet Channel, Everybody Votes Channel, Check Mii Out Channel, Nintendo Channel, Netflix Channel, and the Television Friend Channel. Until the channel's shut down on January 30, 2019, all downloadable channels were free of charge. The originally purposed name for the channel was the Shopping Channel.

On September 29, 2017, Nintendo announced that they would discontinue the Wii Shop Channel on January 30, 2019, with the purchase of Wii Points ending on March 26, 2018. The ability to redownload previously purchased content or transfer Wii data from the Wii to the Wii U remains available.

=== Forecast Channel ===
The Forecast Channel allowed weather reports and forecasts provided by Weathernews to be shown on the console from the Internet via the WiiConnect24 service. The Forecast Channel displayed a view of the Earth as a globe (courtesy of NASA's The Blue Marble image), with which users can view weather in other regions. When fully zoomed out, an accurate star map was visible in the background, including the Big Dipper and the constellation Orion, which were easily recognizable. The Forecast Channel features included the current forecast, the UV index, the day's overall forecast, the next day's forecast, a five-day forecast (only for the selected country in which the user lives), a laundry check (Japan only) and pollen count (Japan only). The Forecast Channel first became available on December 19, 2006. Certain games could use the Forecast Channel to simulate weather conditions depending on the player's region.

There are slight variations of Forecast Channel versions in different regions. When viewing weather conditions in Japan, a different set of weather icons is used. Additionally, the laundry index was only featured in the Japanese version.

After the August 6, 2007 update, the Forecast Channel showed the icon for the current weather on the Wii Menu.

The Forecast Channel (along with the News Channel) was not available in South Korea.

Like the four other WiiConnect24 channels (News Channel, Everybody Votes Channel, Check Mii Out Channel/Mii Contest Channel, Nintendo Channel), the Forecast Channel ended its seven-year support on June 27, 2013.

=== News Channel ===
The News Channel allowed users to access news headlines and current news events obtained from the Internet. News articles were available on a globe view, allowing users to view news from certain areas of the world (similar to the Forecast Channel), and as a slide show. The content was automatically updated and viewable via WiiConnect24 with clickable news images supported. The channel contained seven categories: National News, International News, Sports, Arts/Entertainment, Business, Technology and Oddities.

The News Channel became available in North America, Europe, and Australia on January 26, 2007. Content was in a variety of languages provided by the Associated Press, who had a two-year contract to provide news and photos to Nintendo. Canadian news was submitted by the Canadian Press for publication. Japanese news was provided by Goo. European news was provided by Agence France-Presse.

Starting with the August 6, 2007 update, the News Channel showed a news ticker in the Wii Menu, and when selecting the channel. However, not visiting the channel for a period of time resulted in the ticker not appearing, instead displaying "You must use the News Channel regularly for news to be displayed on this screen" or "Unable to obtain the news" on the preview screen until the channel was used. On December 20, 2007, a PAL region update was released and increased the number of news feeds to the channel, sourced from a larger number of news resources and agencies, providing more news that were available per country.

The News Channel (along with the Forecast Channel) was not available in South Korea.

Like the four other WiiConnect24 channels (Forecast Channel, Everybody Votes Channel, Mii Contest Channel, Nintendo Channel), the News Channel ended its seven-year support on June 27, 2013.

=== Get Connected Video Channel ===
The Get Connected Video Channel or Wii & the Internet Channel (or alternatively known as the Wii + Internet Channel or Wii: See What You Can Do On the Internet) is pre-installed onto Wii console units manufactured after October 2008. It contains an informational video specifying the benefits of connecting the Wii console to the Internet, such as downloading extra channels, new software, Virtual Console titles, and playing games over Nintendo Wi-Fi Connection.

The Get Connected Video Channel is the only pre-installed channel that uses spare internal memory, and the only channel that can be manually deleted or moved to an SD card by the user. The channel uses over half of the Wii's internal memory space. Upon connecting to the internet and running the channel, the user would have the option if they would like to delete it. It cannot be redownloaded or restored upon deletion.

The same video presentation contained in the channel was also viewed on Nintendo's official website.

The channel is also available in multiple languages. Unlike the other channels, the video in the channel is not translated digitally, but is presented in multiple dubs, which means there are multiple copies of the same video in a single channel. The language of the video is presented is respectively according to the Wii's language setting. There are three languages available in the US versions: English, French and Spanish; and six in the PAL version: English, French, Spanish, German, Italian and Dutch.

=== Internet Channel ===
The Internet Channel is a version of the Opera web browser for use on the Wii by Opera Software and Nintendo. On December 22, 2006, a free demo version (promoted as "Internet Channel: Trial Version") of the browser was released. The final version (promoted as "Internet Channel: Final Version") of the browser was released on April 11, 2007, and was free to download until June 30, 2007, when the Internet Channel began to cost 500 Wii Points to download until September 1, 2009, although users who downloaded the browser before June 30, 2007, could continue to use it at no cost for the lifetime of the Wii system. An update (promoted as the "Internet Channel") on October 10, 2007 added USB keyboard compatibility. On September 1, 2009, the Internet Channel was made available to Wii owners for no cost of Wii Points and updated to include improved Adobe Flash Player support. A refund was issued to those who paid for the channel in the form of one free NES game download worth 500 Wii Points.

The Internet Channel uses whichever connection is chosen in the Wii settings, and utilizes the user's internet connection directly; there is no third party network that traffic is being routed through. It receives a connection from a router/modem and uses a web browser to pull up HTTP and HTTPS (secure and encrypted) web pages. Opera, the Wii's web browser, is capable of rendering most web sites in the same manner as its desktop counterpart by using Opera's Medium Screen Rendering technology.

The software is saved to the Wii's 512 MB internal flash memory (it can be copied to an SD card after it had been downloaded). The temporary internet files (maximum of 5MB for the trial version) can only be saved to the Wii's internal memory. The application launches within a few seconds, after connecting to the internet through a wireless LAN using the built-in interface or a wired LAN by using the USB to the Ethernet adapter.

The Opera-based Wii browser allows users full access to the internet and supports all the same web standards that are included in the desktop versions of Opera, including CSS and JavaScript. It is also possible for the browser to use technologies such as Ajax, SVG, RSS, and Adobe Flash Player 8 and limited support for Adobe Flash Player 9. Opera Software has indicated that the functionality will allow for third parties to create web applications specifically designed for the use on the Wii Browser, and it will support widgets, standalone web-based applications using Opera as an application platform.

Third party APIs and SDKs have been released that allow developers to read the values of the Wii Remote buttons in both Flash and JavaScript. This allows for software that previously required keyboard controls to be converted for use with the Wii Remote. The browser was also used to stream BBC iPlayer videos starting on April 9, 2008, after an exclusive deal was made with Nintendo UK and the BBC to offer their streaming service for the Wii. However, the September 2009 update caused the iPlayer to no longer operate. The BBC acknowledged the issue and created a dedicated channel instead. In June 2009, YouTube released YouTube XL, a television version of the video-sharing website. The regular YouTube page would redirect the browser to YouTube XL, if the website detected that the Internet Channel or the PlayStation 3 browser is being used.

=== Everybody Votes Channel ===
The Everybody Votes Channel allowed users to vote in simple opinion polls and compare and contrast opinions with those of friends, family, and people across the globe.

The Everybody Votes Channel was launched on February 13, 2007, and was available in the Wii Channels section of the Wii Shop Channel. The application allowed Wii owners to vote on various questions using their Mii as a registered voter. Additionally, voters were also able to make predictions for the choice that would be the most popular overall after their own vote has been cast. Each Mii's voting and prediction record was tracked and voters can also view how their opinions compare to others. Whether the Mii was correct in its predictions or not was displayed on a statistics page along with a counter of how many times that Mii had voted. Up to six Miis would be registered to vote on the console. The channel was free to download. Each player would make a suggestion for a poll a day.

Like the four other WiiConnect24 channels (Forecast Channel, News Channel, Nintendo Channel, Check Mii Out Channel/Mii Contest Channel), the Everybody Votes Channel ended its seven-year support on June 27, 2013. Unlike the other discontinued channels, the Everybody Votes Channel remains accessible with users able to view the poll data posted before WiiConnect24's closure.

=== Check Mii Out Channel ===
The Check Mii Out Channel (also known as the Mii Contest Channel in Australia, Europe and Japan, and Canal Miirame in Spanish-speaking Latin American countries) was a channel that allowed players to share their Miis and enter them into popularity contests. It was first available on November 11, 2007. It was available free to download from the Wii channels section of the Wii Shop Channel.

Users would post their own Miis in the Posting Plaza, or import other user-submitted Miis to their own personal Mii Parade. Each submitted Mii was assigned a twelve-digit entry number to aid in searching. Submitted Miis were given two initials by their creator and a notable skill/talent to aid in sorting.

In the Contests section, players submitted their own Miis to compete in contests to best fit a certain description (such as Mario without his cap). After the time period for sending a Mii had expired, the user had the choice of voting for three Miis featured on the judging panel, with ten random Miis being shown at a time. Once the judging period is over, the results of the contest may be viewed. Their selection or submission's popularity in comparison to others was displayed, as well as the winning Mii and user.

The Check Mii Out Channel sent messages to the Wii Message Board concerning recent contests. Participants in certain contests would add their user and submitted Mii to a photo with a background related to the contest theme. This picture would then be sent to the Wii Message Board.

This channel ended its seven-year support on June 27, 2013, along with the four other WiiConnect24 channels (Forecast Channel, News Channel, Everybody Votes Channel, Nintendo Channel).

=== Nintendo Channel ===
The Nintendo Channel (known as the Everybody's Nintendo Channel in Japan) allowed Wii users to watch videos such as interviews, trailers, commercials, and download demos for the Nintendo DS line of systems. The Nintendo Channel had the ability to support Nintendo Entertainment System games, Super NES games, Nintendo 64 games, and GameCube games. Later the channel was used for the Wii U, and the Nintendo Switch under the name of the Nintendo eShop. In this capacity the channel worked in a similar way to the DS Download Station. The channel provided games, info, pages and users could rate games that they have played. A search feature was also available to assist users in finding new games to try or buy. The channel had the ability to take the user directly into the Wii Shop Channel for buying the wanted game immediately. The Nintendo Channel was launched in Japan on November 27, 2007, in North America on May 7, 2008, and in Europe and Australia on May 30, 2008. The Nintendo Channel was updated with different Nintendo DS demos and new videos every week; the actual day of the week varies across different international regions. Nintendo DS demos can be transmitted to the handheld console.

An updated version of the Nintendo Channel was released in Japan on July 15, 2009, North America on September 14, 2009, and in Europe on December 15, 2009. The update introduced a new interface and additional features, options, and statistics for users to view. However, the European version was missing some of these new additional features, such as options for choosing video quality. In addition, a weekly show known as Nintendo Week began airing exclusively on the North American edition of the channel, while another show, Nintendo TV, was available on the UK version of the channel.

The Nintendo Channel and the other WiiConnect24 channels (Forecast Channel, News Channel, Everybody Votes Channel, and Check Mii Out Channel/Mii Contest Channel) ended their seven-year supporton June 27, 2013.

Nintendo Channel had several original programming which were less than twenty minutes long:

- Nintendo Week: The hosts were Gary and Allison, but other co-hosts appeared as well like Dark Gary, Daniel, and others.
- Ultimate Wii Challenge/New Super Mario Bros. Wii Challenge: The hosts were David and Ben. They tried to beat each other's time in Nintendo games like New Super Mario Bros. Wii, Donkey Kong Country Returns, Super Mario Galaxy 2, and Kirby's Epic Yarn. In a few episodes, Ben and David worked together in levels of a few games.

Many Nintendo DS demos were available in Nintendo Channel's DS Download Service.

=== Discontinuation ===
The Forecast Channel, the News Channel, the Everybody Votes Channel, the Check Mii Out Channel, and the Mii Contest Channel were shut down on June 27, 2013, as Nintendo terminated the WiiConnect24 service which these channels required, and shifted their resources to their next-generation projects, such as the Wii U and Nintendo 3DS.

== Other channels ==
These channels were those that could be acquired through the usage of various games and accessories.

=== Wii Fit/Wii Fit Plus Channel ===
Wii Fit allows users to install the Wii Fit Channel to the Wii Menu. The channel allows them to view and compare their results, and those of others, as well as their progress in the game, without requiring the game disc to be inserted.

The channel allows users to access some of the features of Wii Fit. It allows users to view statistics from the game including users' BMI measurements and balance test scores in the form of a line graph, as well as keep track of the various activities they have undertaken with a calendar. Users were also able to weigh themselves and do a BMI and balance test with the channel once per day. However, if the player wants to do any exercises or play any of the aerobics games or balance games, the game prompted the user to insert the Wii Fit game disc.

=== Mario Kart Channel ===
Mario Kart Wii allows players to install the Mario Kart Channel on their Wii console. The channel can work without inserting the Mario Kart Wii disc into the console, but to compete in races and time trials the disc is required. The use of the Mario Kart Channel allows for a number of options. A ranking option lets players see their best Time Trial scores for each track and compare their results to those of their friends and other players worldwide, represented by their Miis. Players will have the option of racing against the random or selective ghosts, or improving their results gradually by taking on the ghosts of rivals, those with similar race times. Users have the option to submit these times for others around the world to view. Players can also manage and register friends using the channel and see if any of them are currently online.

Another feature of the channel are Tournaments, where Nintendo invited players to challenges similar to the missions on Mario Kart DS. Players were also able to compare their competition rankings with other players.

As of May 20, 2014, most features of the channel have been discontinued, such as Tournaments.

=== Jam with the Band Live Channel ===
The Nintendo DS game Jam with the Band supports the Jam with the Band Live Channel (known as the Speaker Channel in Japan) that allows players to connect their game to a Wii console and let the game's audio be played through the channel. The channel supports multiple players.

=== Wii Speak Channel ===
Users with the Wii Speak peripheral were able to access the Wii Speak Channel. Users could join one of four rooms (with no limit to the number of people in each room) to chat with others online. Each user is represented by their own Mii, which lip-syncs to their words. In addition, users could also leave audio messages for other users by sending a message to their Wii Message Board. Users can also photo slideshows and comment on them. The Wii Speak Channel became available in North America and Europe on December 5, 2008, and was discontinued on May 20, 2014. The Wii Speak Channel is succeeded by Wii U Chat, which is standardized for the Wii U console.

=== Rabbids Channel ===
The Rabbids Channel is a channel created by Rabbids Go Home. When the game is started up for the first time or when the player goes to the player profile screen, the player may install the Rabbids Channel, which will appear on the Wii Menu once it is downloaded. Players can use the channel to view other people's Rabbids and enter contests.

== Downloadable channels ==
Downloadable channels are channels that could be downloaded from the Wii Shop Channel.

=== Virtual Console Channels ===
Virtual Console channels were channels that allowed users to play their downloaded Virtual Console games obtained from the Wii Shop Channel. The Virtual Console portion of the Wii Shop Channel specialized in older software originally designed and released for discontinued home entertainment platforms. These games were played on the Wii through the emulation of the older hardware. The prices were generally the same in almost every region and were determined primarily by the software's original platform. There was initially planned to be a Virtual Console channel where users could launch their Virtual Console games sorted by console, but this idea was cancelled.

=== WiiWare Channels ===
Functioning similarly to the Virtual Console channels, WiiWare channels allowed users to use their WiiWare games obtained from the Wii Shop Channel. The WiiWare section specialized in downloadable software specifically designed for the Wii. The first WiiWare games were released in Japan on March 25, 2008. WiiWare games launched in North America on May 12, 2008, and launched in Europe and Australia on May 20, 2008.

The WiiWare section was being touted as a forum to provide developers with small budgets to release smaller-scale games without the investment and risk of creating a title to be sold at retail (somewhat similar to the Xbox Live Arcade and the PlayStation Store). While actual games have been planned to appear in this section since its inception, no official announcement was made about this until June 27, 2007, when Nintendo confirmed in a press release which revealed the first titles would be released sometime in 2008. According to Nintendo, "The remarkable motion controls will give birth to fresh takes on established genres, as well as original ideas that currently exist only in developers' minds."

Like Virtual Console games, WiiWare games were purchased using Wii Points. Nintendo provided all pricing options for the downloadable games.

=== Television Friend Channel (Japan only) ===
The Television Friend Channel allowed Wii users to view programs that are on the television. Content was provided by Guide Plus. It was developed by HAL Laboratory. The channel was stated to be "very fun and Nintendo-esque". A "stamp" feature allowed users to mark programs of interest with a Mii-themed stamp. If an e-mail address or mobile phone number would have been registered in the address book, the channel could send out an alert 30 minutes prior to the start of the selected program. The channel tracked the stamps of all Wii users and allowed users to rate programs on a five-star scale. Additionally, when the channel was active the Wii Remote could be used to change the TV's volume and channel so that users can tune into their shows by way of the channel. The Television Friend Channel launched in Japan on March 4, 2008, and was discontinued on July 24, 2011, due to the shutdown of analog television broadcasts in Japan. It was never launched outside Japan, as most countries, unlike Japan, have a guide built into set-top boxes or televisions. The Television Friend Channel was succeeded by Nintendo TVii, which was standardized for the Wii U console. It also had the Kirby 1-UP sound, since it was made by HAL Laboratory. This was later removed before the release of the channel.

=== Digicam Print Channel (Japan only) ===
The Digicam Print Channel was a channel developed in collaboration with Fujifilm that allowed users to import their digital photos from an SD card and place them into templates for printable photo books and business cards through a software wizard. The user was also able to place their Mii on a business card. The completed design would then be sent online to Fujifilm who printed and delivered the completed product to the user. The processing of individual photos was also available.

The Digicam Print Channel became available from July 23, 2008, in Japan, and was discontinued on June 26, 2013.

=== Today and Tomorrow Channel ===
The Today and Tomorrow Channel became available in Japan on December 2, 2008, and in Europe, Australia, and South Korea on September 9, 2009. The channel was developed in collaboration with Media Kobo and allows users to view fortunes for up to six Miis across five categories: love, work, study, communications, and money. The channel also features a compatibility test that compares two Miis, and also gives out "lucky words" that must be interpreted by the user. The channel uses Mii birthdate data, but users must input a birth year when they are loaded onto the channel. This channel was never released in North America, and although the channel cannot be obtained after January 30, 2019, with the Wii Shop Channel discontinuation, it continues to be redownloaded if obtained before the Wii Shop Channel's closure.

=== Wii no Ma (Japan only) ===
Wii no Ma (Wii Room) was a video on-demand service channel that was released in Japan on May 1, 2009. The channel was a joint venture between Nintendo and Japanese advertising agency Dentsu. The channel's interface was built around a virtual living room, where up to eight Miis could be registered and interact with each other. The virtual living room contained a TV which took the viewer to the video list. Celebrity "concierge" Miis occasionally introduced special programming. Nintendo discontinued Wii no Ma on April 30, 2012.

=== Demae Channel (Japan only) ===
A food delivery service channel was released in Japan on May 26, 2009. The channel was a joint venture between Nintendo and the Japanese on-line food delivery portal service Demae-can, and was developed by Denyu-sha. The channel offered a wide range of foods provided by different food delivery companies which could be ordered directly through the Wii channel. A note was posted to the Wii Message Board containing what had been ordered and the total price. The food was then delivered to the address the Wii user had registered on the channel. On February 22, 2017, Demae Channel was delisted from the Wii Shop Channel, it was later discontinued alongside the Wii U version on March 31, 2017.

=== BBC iPlayer Channel (UK only) ===
Wii access to the BBC iPlayer was interrupted on April 9, 2008, when an update to the Opera Browser became incompatible with the BBC iPlayer. The BBC chose not to make the BBC iPlayer compatible with the upgrade. This was resolved on November 18, 2009, when they released the BBC iPlayer Channel, allowing easier access to the BBC iPlayer.

The BBC offered a free, dedicated Wii channel version of their BBC iPlayer application which was only available in the UK. On February 10, 2015, the channel was discontinued and consequently removed from Wii Shop Channel since newer versions are not compatible, and as per BBC's policy to discontinue older versions as a resource management. The channel was succeeded by the BBC iPlayer app on the UK edition of the Wii U eShop, which was released in May 2015.

=== Netflix Channel ===
The Netflix channel was released in the United States and Canada on October 18, 2010, and in the UK and Ireland on January 9, 2012. This channel allowed Netflix subscribers to use that service's "Watch Instantly" streaming service over the Wii with their regular Netflix subscription fee, and replaced the previous Wii "streaming disc" mailed to Netflix customers with Wii consoles from March 27 to October 17, 2010, due to contractual limitations involving Xbox 360 exclusivity. The channel was free to download in the Wii Channels section of the Wii Shop Channel. The channel displayed roughly 12 unique categories of videos with exactly 75 video titles in each category. The TV category containd most of the season and episodes associated with each title. There were also categories for videos recently watched, new releases, and videos recommended (based on the user's Netflix subscription history). On July 31, 2018, the channel was delisted from the Wii Shop Channel; Netflix ended support for the Wii on January 30, 2019.

=== LoveFilm Channel (UK and Germany only) ===
On 4 December 2012, the LoveFilm channel was available to download on Wii consoles in the UK and Germany; the channel was discontinued on 31 October 2017, along with the closure of LoveFilm itself.

=== Kirby TV Channel (PAL regions only) ===
The Kirby TV Channel launched on June 23, 2011, in Europe, Australia and New Zealand, and was discontinued several months later. The channel allowed users to view episodes of the animated series Kirby: Right Back at Ya! for free. This channel was succeeded by the Nintendo Anime Channel, a Nintendo 3DS video-on-demand app, available in Australasia and Europe, which streamed curated anime or anime-inspired shows, such as Kirby: Right Back at Ya!.

=== Hulu Plus Channel ===
Hulu Plus Channel was a channel for the Wii, also as announced in Nintendo Updates on Nintendo Channel. Hulu Plus Channel included television programs and other Hulu included shows. The channel launched in 2012, and It was available only in the United States and Japan, the latter of where the channel is branded as simply "Hulu." On January 30, 2019, Hulu ended support for the Wii.

=== The Legend of Zelda: Skyward Sword Save Data Update Channel ===
The Legend of Zelda: Skyward Sword Save Data Update Channel fixed an issue in the game The Legend of Zelda: Skyward Sword. This title was the only Wii game to receive a downloadable, self-patching service, wherein previous titles with technical issues, such as Metroid: Other M, required the game's owners experiencing said issues to send their Wii consoles to customer service where Nintendo had to manually fix such issues.

=== YouTube ===
YouTube allowed the user to view YouTube videos on the television screen and had the ability to sign into an existing YouTube account. The channel, which became available without any prior announcement, was only available in the North American, UK, Japanese, and Australian versions of the Wii system, with the North American release on November 15, 2012, three days before the Wii U was released in North America. Google planned to gradually make the channel available on Wii in other countries besides the aforementioned regions. YouTube was initially categorised on the Wii Shop Channel as a WiiWare title by mistake, but this was later fixed when the Wii U Transfer Tool channel became available. On June 26, 2017, YouTube terminated legacy support for all devices that continue using the Flash-based YouTube app (typically found in most television devices released before 2012), which includes the Wii.

=== Wii U Transfer Tool Channel ===
This application became available on the Wii Shop Channel the day the Wii U was released per respective region. The only purpose of this channel is to assist transferring all eligible content out from a Wii console to a Wii U console, where the said content would be available via Wii Mode on the target Wii U. The application can transfer all available listed WiiWare titles (initially with the sole exemption of LostWinds for unknown reasons, but the game became available for both transfer to and purchase on Wii U in May 2014), all available listed Virtual Console titles, game save data, DLC data, Mii Channel data, Wii Shop Channel data (including Wii Points, conditional that accumulated total does not exceed 10,000 Wii Points on target Wii U), and Nintendo Wi-Fi Connection ID data to a target Wii U (prior to Nintendo Wi-Fi's shutdown in May 2014), but it cannot transfer Wii settings data, pre-installed WiiWare/Virtual Console titles (such as Donkey Kong: Original Edition that came pre-installed in the PAL version of the Super Mario Bros. 25th Anniversary Wii bundle), any game or application software that had been delisted from the Wii Shop Channel prior to the release of Wii U (such as the Donkey Kong Country trilogy), software that is already available on the target Wii U's Wii Mode, WiiConnect24-supported software and save data (which includes the 16-digit Wii console Friend Code), and GameCube save data since the Wii U does not support the latter two. It is possible to move content from multiple Wii consoles to a single target Wii U console, as well as multiple transfers from a single Wii console if required, albeit the last Wii console's content will overwrite any similar Wii data transferred to target Wii U earlier. Due to technical limitations, the channel cannot directly transfer any eligible background data which has been saved on the console's SD card.

The Wii U Transfer Tool Channel features an animation based on the Pikmin series, wherein a visual transfer display of various Pikmin would automatically carry the eligible data and software to a space ship, likely representing the SD card used to perform the transfer, bound for the Wii U. While context dynamic, this animation is not interactive, and is shown for entertainment purposes.

The ability to transfer content from the Wii to the Wii U continues to be available for the foreseeable future after the Wii Shop Channel's shutdown on January 30, 2019.

=== Amazon Instant Video (United States only) ===
Amazon Instant Video, a video on demand service provided by Amazon, was released as a downloadable Wii channel in the United States on January 17, 2013; the service was discontinued on January 30, 2019.

=== Crunchyroll ===
In December 2014, Crunchyroll released their video app for the Wii's successor, Wii U, in North America. However, believing that many Wii consoles were still being used at the time, Crunchyroll released a Crunchyroll channel for the Wii without any prior announcement, launching the app categorized under WiiWare on October 15, 2015, in North America and the PAL regions. The Crunchyroll Wii channel only permitted access to Premium account holders to the majority of the prime content. On May 5, 2017, less than 20 months after its launch, Crunchyroll ended support for the Wii due to technical limitations after the service updated with new technology.

== Wii Message Board ==
The Message Board allows users to leave messages for friends, family members, or other users on a calendar-based message board. Users could also use WiiConnect24 to trade messages and pictures with other Wii owners, conventional email accounts (email pictures to console, but not pictures to email), and mobile phones (through text messages). Each Wii has an individual wii.com email account containing the Wii Number. Prior to trading messages it is necessary to add and approve contacts in the address book, although the person added will not receive an automatic notification of the request, and must be notified by other means. The service also alerts all users of incoming game-related information.

Message Board was available for users to post messages that are available to other Wii users by usage of Wii Numbers with WiiConnect24. In addition to writing text, players can also include images from an SD card in the body of messages, as well as attaching a Mii to the message. Announcements of software updates and video game news are posted by Nintendo. The Message Board can be used for posting memos for oneself or for family members without going online. These messages could then be put on any day of the calendar. The Wii Message Board could also be updated automatically by a real-time game like Animal Crossing: City Folk.

Some games such as Wii Sports, Wii Play, Mario Kart Wii, Wii Speak Channel, Wii Sports Resort, Super Mario Galaxy and Super Mario Galaxy 2 use the Message Board to update the player on any new high scores or gameplay advancements, such as medal placements in the former two titles, completions of races including a photo, audio messages, and letters from the Mailtoad via the Wii Message Board. Metroid Prime 3: Corruption, Super Mario Galaxy, Super Smash Bros Brawl, Elebits, Animal Crossing: City Folk, Dewy's Adventure and the Virtual Console game Pokémon Snap allow players to take screenshots and post them to the Message Board to edit later or send to friends via messages. Except for GameCube games, the Message Board also records the play history in the form of "Today's Accomplishments". This feature automatically records details of what games or applications were played and for how long. It cannot be deleted or hidden without formatting the console itself. Prior to its closure, the Nintendo Channel was able to automatically tally all Wii game play data from the Message Board and display them in an ordered list within the channel.

Subsequent system updates added a number of minor features to the Message Board, including minor aesthetic changes, USB keyboard support and the ability to receive Internet links from friends, which can be launched in the Internet Channel.

An exploit in the Wii Message Board can be used to homebrew a Wii via a tool called LetterBomb.

=== Discontinuation ===
The WiiConnect24 service was terminated on June 27, 2013, which discontinued the data exchange functionality of the Wii Message Board for all Wii consoles, whether as messages or game data. However, Nintendo continued sending some notification messages after that date to any continuously up and running Wii consoles.

== SD Card Menu ==
The SD Card Menu is a feature made available with the release of Wii Menu version 4.0. This menu allows the user to run Virtual Console games, WiiWare games, and Wii Channels directly from the SD card, which makes it possible to free up the Wii's internal memory. Applications can be downloaded to the SD card directly from the Wii Shop Channel as well. When running an application from the SD Card Menu, it is temporarily copied to the internal memory of the Wii, meaning the internal memory still must contain an amount of free blocks equal to the application's size. If the internal memory does not have enough space, the Channel will run an "Automanager" program, which clears up space for the user in one of many ways (selectable by the user).

The manager can place the largest channels on the user's Wii in the SD card, put smaller channels on the SD card until enough space remains to run the channel, clear channels from the left side of the Wii menu to the right side, or from the right side to the left until there are enough blocks to run the channel.

== History of updates ==
System version 1.0 was released on launch day, and was designed mainly for offline use, as connecting to the internet would trigger an update prompt to install 2.0. For a while after that, the Wii received new features such as the Forecast Channel, as well as bug fixes.

Some of these updates also included fixes to block the early forms of homebrew, the first of which was an SSL issue in the Wii Shop Channel. Later in 2007, Nintendo added code to block the GameCube Action Replay, although this update was bundled with several other features in the 3.0 update.

A week after Wii Freeloader released, Nintendo released an update containing a new IOS with the bug exploited by Freeloader fixed, although this new IOS was not used by the Wii Menu. Later that year, Nintendo released a new Wii Menu that copied this fix to the IOS used by the Wii Menu. In addition, code was added to the Wii Menu to delete the primary homebrew entrypoint, although this code was very buggy and was easily bypassed. Nintendo also patched the hole used to extract the private encryption keys of the Wii, and finally made a small change to the Mii Channel to convince people to update.

Nintendo's next few updates made similar small changes to various channels, and one of them copied the fix for the previous IOS bug to every IOS, as well as a few other exploit fixes. A few weeks later, Nintendo ported these new fixes to every IOS, made a failed attempt to block a specific homebrew IOS, and made their second attempt at fixing the main homebrew entrypoint. This attempt at stopping the homebrew entrypoint was then superseded by a successful attempt in 2009, along with other IOS fixes, and some features.

Later that year, Nintendo released another homebrew-blocking update, but unlike the previous updates, it offered no new features; instead, it updated the Wii Shop Channel to require the new version. In addition to fixing homebrew bugs, it detects the Homebrew Channel and deletes it if it is present, replaced several IOSes used by homebrew with nonfunctional versions, and updated a bootloader to overwrite the one used by homebrew, unexpectedly causing many consoles to refuse to boot. Two similar updates were then released throughout 2010, although the only attempts to delete Wii homebrew were in the Wii U's Wii Mode feature after 2010.

The final update released in PAL and American regions added support to transfer content to the Wii U. Two updates were released in Japan that only affected Dragon Quest X players, solely updating the IOS used by Dragon Quest X.

== See also ==
- Nintendo Wi-Fi Connection
- WiiConnect24
- Wii Shop Channel

Other gaming platforms from Nintendo:

- Nintendo 3DS system software
- Nintendo DSi system software
- Wii U system software
- Nintendo Switch system software

Other gaming platforms from the next generation:

- PlayStation 4 system software
- PlayStation Vita system software
- Xbox One system software

Other gaming platforms from this generation:

- PlayStation 3 system software
- PlayStation Portable system software
- Xbox 360 system software
