= WiiConnect24 =

Internet service for Nintendo's Wii home video game console

- Developer: Nintendo
- Type: Online service
- Launched: November 19, 2006
- Discontinued: June 27, 2013; 13 years ago
- Platform: Wii
- Status: Defunct
- Website: nintendo.com

WiiConnect24 was a feature of Nintendo Wi-Fi Connection for the Wii. It was first announced at Electronic Entertainment Expo (E3) in mid-2006 by Nintendo. It enabled the user to remain connected to the Internet while the console was on standby. For example, in Animal Crossing: City Folk, a friend could send messages to another player without the recipient being present in the game at the same time as the sender.

On June 27, 2013, Nintendo shut down WiiConnect24. Consequently, the Wii channels that required it, online data exchange via Wii Message Board, and passive online features for certain games (the latter two of which made use of 16-digit Wii Friend Codes) were all rendered unusable.

The Wii U does not officially support WiiConnect24, therefore most preloaded and downloadable Wii channels were unavailable on the Wii U's Wii Mode menu and Wii Shop Channel, even prior to WiiConnect24's shutdown. On the shutdown date, the defunct downloadable Wii channels were removed from the Wii Shop Channel.

WiiConnect24 was succeeded by SpotPass, a different trademark name for similar content-pushing functions that the Nintendo Network service could perform for the newer Nintendo 3DS and Wii U consoles. SpotPass shut down alongside the Nintendo Network on April 8, 2024.

In 2015 and 2020, fan-made services, called RiiConnect24 and WiiLink respectively (both of which merged together on December 29, 2023), were established as replacements for WiiConnect24, aimed at bringing back WiiConnect24 to those that have a homebrewed Wii console. Both services offered access to most services that formerly used WiiConnect24, as well as sending messages to other users in the Wii Message Board.

== Service ==
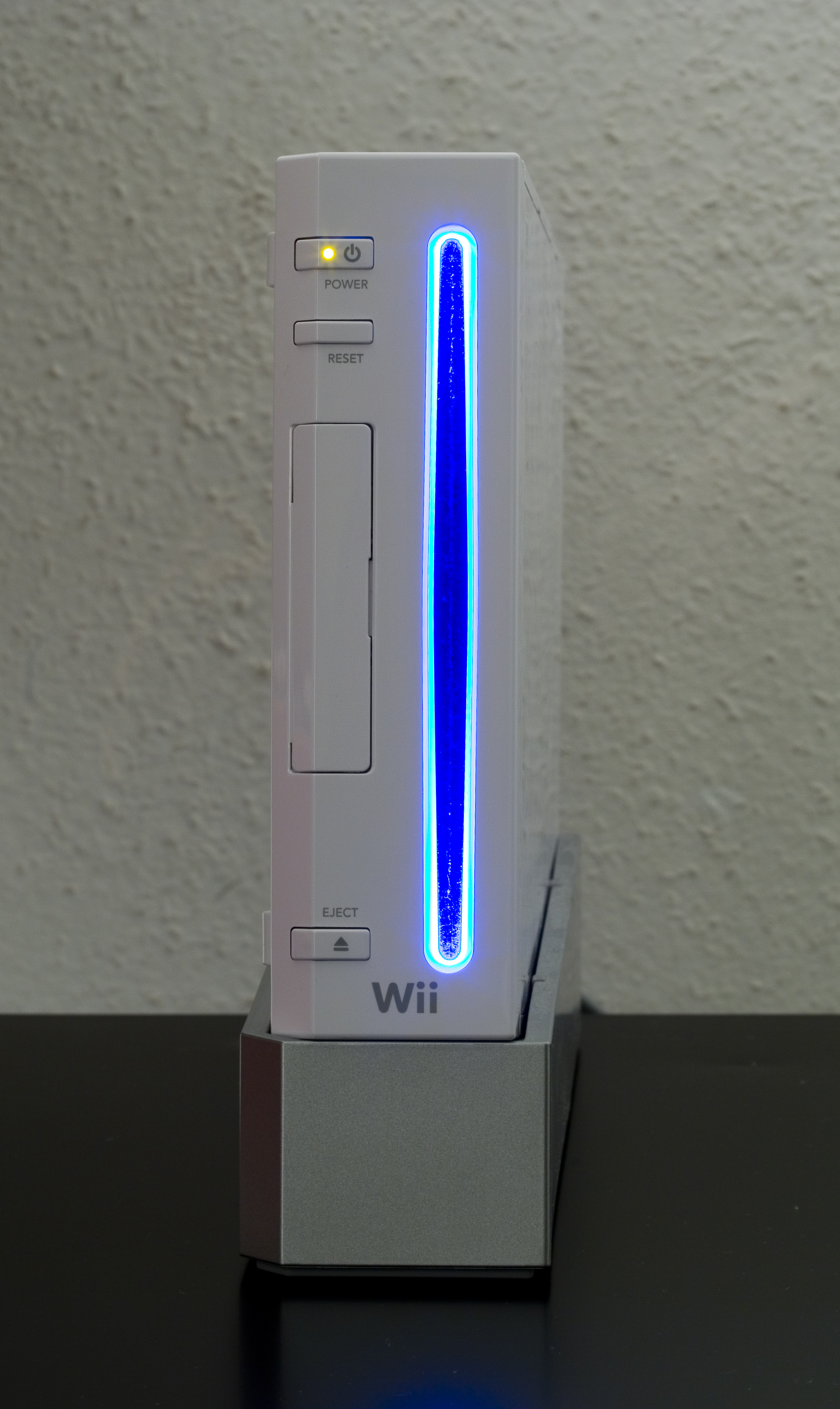
A Wii unit in standby mode with a message received

WiiConnect24 was used to receive content such as Wii Message Board messages sent from other Wii consoles, Miis, emails, updated channel and game content, and notifications of software updates. If the Standby Connect mode of WiiConnect24 is enabled, this content can also be received when the Wii is left in standby mode. While running in standby mode with Standby Connection enabled, the Wii uses about 9.6 watts, compared to 1.3 watts without WiiConnect24.

WiiConnect24 can still be turned on or off via the setup interface. If it is on, the user is allowed to enable or disable Standby Connect mode. While the console is in standby, the power LED indicates the current status of the standby connection; red indicating Standby Connect is off and yellow indicating Standby Connect mode is on. If the power button on the console is pressed and held down for three to four seconds, the Wii goes into standby mode with Standby Connect off. If the Wii is cut off from power and power is later restored, it goes into standby mode with Standby Connect mode off, and WiiConnect24 will not operate until the console is turned on.

The Wii's optical drive will glow a neon-blue colour when Wii Message Board data has been received through WiiConnect24 in Standby Connect mode and, with firmware 3.0 and above, it will briefly flash when the console is turned on. The brightness level of this blue light can be changed via the Setup Interface with the options of Bright, Dim, or Off.

The flowing light on the Wii is timed with the bird call of the Japanese bush warbler.

When game messages are received with pictures, the player can view and customise them in the Photo Channel. The player would also be able to send them to other Wii consoles. Nintendo would also send messages to players, which they could opt out of.

== Functionality ==
During an interview with the Japanese newspaper Nikkei Business Publications, Nintendo's CEO, Satoru Iwata, revealed that the WiiConnect24 could be used for the downloading of demos for the Nintendo DS (this was later revealed to be the Nintendo Channel).

"Let's say your Wii is connected to the Internet in a mode that allows activation on a 24-hour basis. This would allow Nintendo to send monthly promotional demos for the DS, during the night, to the Wii consoles in each household. Users would wake up each morning, find the LED lamp on their Wii flashing, and know that Nintendo has sent them something. They would then be able to download the promotional demo from their Wii systems to their Nintendo DS's."

According to Nintendo's European micro-site for the Wii, WiiConnect24 could be used to send SMS messages "to family members that are out and about", and exchange pictures and messages with other Wii users.

== Channels ==
The following were Wii Menu channels which used WiiConnect24 and were released in North America:

Channel	Description	Release date	Discontinuation date
Mii Channel	Miis created by friends can be shared	November 19, 2006 (came with console)	—N/a
Wii Shop Channel	Download games by using "Wii Points"	November 19, 2006 (came with console)	January 30, 2019
Forecast Channel	Current local and worldwide weather conditions	December 20, 2006 (an update was required to activate the channel in launch consoles)	June 27, 2013
News Channel	The latest news articles and headlines	January 24, 2007 (an update was required to activate the channel in launch consoles)	June 27, 2013
Everybody Votes Channel	View polls and results	February 14, 2007	June 27, 2013
Check Mii Out Channel/Mii Contest Channel	Miis can be shared as well as judged on a global scale	November 11, 2007	June 27, 2013
Mario Kart Channel	Can race ghost data, view worldwide racing times, view friend list, participate in competitions like tournaments	April 10, 2008 (Japan), April 11, 2008 (Europe), April 24, 2008 (Australia), April 27, 2008 (America)	May 20, 2014
Nintendo Channel	Allows Wii users to watch trailers for games and download demos for the Nintendo DS.	November 27, 2007 (Japan), May 7, 2008 (America), May 30, 2008 (Europe and Australia)	June 27, 2013
Wii Speak Channel	Allows users to leave voice messages on friends' message boards.	December 5, 2008 (users must have Wii Speak to download)	May 20, 2014
Food Channel	Allows users to order food and drinks from a list of restaurants and shops close to them, have it sent to their homes and pay on delivery.	May 26, 2009	March 31, 2017
Photo Prints Channel	Allows users to import their digital photos from an SD card.	July 23, 2008	June 27, 2013
Kirby TV Channel	Allows users to view episodes of the animated series Kirby: Right Back at Ya! for free.	June 23, 2011	October 2012
Wii Room	The channel's interface was built around a virtual living room, where up to 8 Miis can be registered and interact with each other.	May 1, 2009	April 30, 2012
TV Guide Channel	Allows Wii users to check what programs are on the television.	March 4, 2008	July 24, 2011
Metroid Prime 3 Preview Channel	Allows users to watch trailers and previews of Metroid Prime 3: Corruption before it released.	August 10, 2007 (America), October 15, 2007 (Europe)	December 31, 2007

The Forecast Channel and News Channel required WiiConnect24 and Standby Connection to be enabled; if WiiConnect24 was enabled and Standby Connection was disabled, the channels would give an error message upon launch and return the user to the Wii Menu. This was required so the channels could download up-to-date information.

== Problems ==
The initial firmware update caused some parts of the console to be inaccessible to a small portion of people who purchased the Wii at launch. Those Wii consoles received constant error codes. For those users it was necessary to contact Nintendo's customer service to replace or repair the console.

In some countries, trying to connect to WiiConnect24 displayed a screen stating that the service "is currently not being offered". This could be circumvented by selecting a different country as a location. It is currently unknown what the actual availability map of the service was.

The PAL versions of the Wii connected with RGB SCART cables continue to send a SCART switching signal when the Wii is in WiiConnect24 standby mode. This occurs with both official Nintendo RGB SCART cables, and any third party RGB SCART cables that carry the SCART switching signal. This problem can be alleviated by disabling standby mode, but leaving WiiConnect24 running.

When the disc slot light glows, it can cause the Wii to get hot in standby mode. This is because the fan is turned off while the console is in standby mode.

== Closure ==
In April 2013, Nintendo announced that WiiConnect24, as well as its affiliated channels, would shut down on June 28 in Japan, Europe, and Australia; however, other channels including video-on-demand services and the Wii Shop Channel would remain available.

== See also ==
- List of Wii Wi-Fi Connection games
- Online console gaming
