= Wii no Ma =

2009 video-on-demand service for the Wii

- The Wii no Ma application, as seen in the Wii Menu
- Developer: HAL Laboratory
- Publisher: Nintendo
- Series: Wii Channels
- Platform: Wii
- Release: JP: 1 May 2009

Wii no Ma (Note: Japanese: Wiiの間; Wii Room) (Wii Room in English) was a Wii channel that featured a video-on-demand, film rental and shopping service operated by Nintendo and Dentsu. Wii no Ma was released on 1 May 2009, exclusively in Japan, and it could be downloaded from the Wii Shop Channel for free, although paid content and products could be purchased. The service was shut down on 30 April 2012.

== Overview ==
The channel allowed the user to add a family of up to eight Mii characters, which would place them on the Wii Room, a Japanese living room with a tea table and a television. The tea table was what inspired the service, becoming the channel's icon. The characters would do everyday things on the room, like vacuuming, reading manga, eating lunch or playing on their Nintendo DSi. Pointing at different parts of the room with the Wii Remote would take the user to different menus and services. The room would change depending on the season and time of the day.

The service delivered plenty of original shows, also including sponsored content. While there was no specific genre or target audience, the main focus was on programs that were family-friendly.

The channel could be downloaded for free from the Wii Shop Channel, and it used 121 blocks. It was a Japanese-exclusive channel, so it could only be used on Japanese Wii consoles, and only available in Japanese.

== Features ==
=== Rooms ===
By accessing the Iron'na Ma (いろんな間, Various Rooms) menu, the user could find a parade of different Miis with logos of services and partners. Selecting one would take the user to the room of that service, allowing them to find more information about it, watch its content or take part in polls.

The rooms were only available for a limited amount of time, and many were themed around seasons such as New Year's Day or Valentine's Day. Some rooms included original content, such as the Pokémon Room, the Kirby Room, Minna no Ma (みんなの間, Everyone Room) and Mii no Ma (Miiの間, Mii Room). Other rooms featured giveaways or partnered content, like the Warner Room and the Disney Room.

=== Shows ===
Wii no Ma also had a dedicated shows (番組を見る (Bangumi o Miru, Watch the Show)) section, featuring a list of shows aimed for all ages.

Content could be searched by category, genre, gender, blood type, age, ratings or simply the name of the desired programme. A Mii would guide the user to find content they might like. After a video was watched, the registered users could rate it by dragging each their own Mii to the desired rating. The rating ranged from four marks (◎, ○, △, ×, from best to worst). (Note: Initially, the only three rating marks were ○, △, ×. The higher ◎ mark was added on 1 November 2010 with the Shopping Update renewal.)

=== Theatre ===
Wii no Ma received its first update on 21 November 2009, the Theatre Update (sometimes referred to as version 770), which added the Theatre Room. This room depicts the Miis eating in a home cinema, with a big screen and customizable lighting. From this theatre, the user could find paid content and shows or films that could be rented. Some featured shows were The Muppets, Sesame Street, the Pokémon TV series and Kirby: Right Back at Ya! (which was also available in Europe from the Kirby TV Channel).

Content purchases used Wii Points.

=== Shopping ===
On 1 November 2010, Wii no Ma received a new update, the Shopping Update (sometimes referred to as version 1025). It featured a complete renewal, with new menus, a new room, a new opening, and most importantly, the launch of the new Wii no Ma Shopping service.

Through this new service made in collaboration with Senshukai, users could purchase everyday items, food, merchandise, DVD releases of Wii no Ma shows, and special items such as the Mii Stamps. Unlike the Theatre, shop items could be paid for with a credit card, from a convenience store, or on cash on delivery. Orders could also be placed through a phone call for customers who were not comfortable with online shopping.

The new Wii Room was a little smaller than the previous one and featured a large television, but the camera could no longer be rotated. The interface and menus were made easier to access, now all the options were listed on buttons displayed on the screen, rather than needing to point the Wii Remote around the room.

The Shopping Update was the final update to Wii no Ma, although the service's content kept being updated until the shutdown.

=== Concierge Miis ===
Concierge Miis were celebrity or original Mii characters who would visit the user's Wii Room. They would introduce themselves and present recommended shows for the user to watch. Since the Shopping Update, concierge Miis could feature voice recordings too. Concierge Mii videos could be watched again at any time from the Shows section.

=== Messages ===
Wii no Ma included an option to send and receive messages. Users could send messages within their own Wii Room for another family member to read, or to a Wii Friend through the Wii Mail service provided by WiiConnect24. The messages could have up to four speech bubbles, and they could include a video to recommend. The user would choose which Mii would send the message and which mood to present it with. That Mii would then visit the recipient's Wii Room and present the message, and show the recommended video if included.

=== Posters ===
The Wii Room and the Theatre Room featured several posters that would show cycling images of different titles, campaigns, adverts, shows and games, like Wii Sports Resort or Wii Fit. Each poster is linked to a video that can be seen when interacting with them.

== Dokodemo Wii no Ma ==
Dokodemo Wii no Ma (どこでもWiiの間, Wii Room Anywhere) was a Nintendo DSiWare title intended to be used with Wii no Ma. It was made available on the Japanese Nintendo DSi Shop on 1 May 2009 and delisted on 30 April 2012, the same day as Wii no Ma's discontinuation.

It allowed users to transfer Wii no Ma videos to their Nintendo DSi consoles and watch them on the go. Videos could be stored on the console's memory or an SD card. The system memory only allowed for up to 93 blocks, so an SD card was required for long videos. In addition, the users could obtain "Video Coupons" provided by Wii no Ma partners and bring them to the shops to receive various special offers.

== Reception ==
Despite being short-lived and exclusive to Japan, Wii no Ma was considered to be a success. By 26 October 2009, the service had already been used by 2.48 million people in 930,000 homes. As of February 2012, the channel was downloaded 4.49 million times and had 8.81 million users. The service was called "a decidedly quirky feature" of the Wii, due to its "unusual interactive platform".

== Shutdown and revival ==
On 21 February 2012, Nintendo posted a notice announcing that Wii no Ma would be discontinued, only three years after its launch. On 3 March, a room Arigatou no Ma (ありがとうの間, Thank You Room) was added to the parade. On 28 April 2012, a goodbye thank-you message from the staff was shown on the room's television.

Wii no Ma was discontinued on 30 April 2012. Wii no Ma Co., Ltd. then became Nintendo Network Service Database, until it was liquidated in 2018.

Much later, in April 2020, a team of Wii homebrew developers looking to revive, localize, and preserve the channel and other Japanese-exclusive Wii channels was formed. The fan-run service features various translations, community-ran parades, and original programming. Later, on 5 December 2025, the DSiWare companion title Dokodemo Wii no Ma was also localized and revived to function with the revival service.

== See also ==
- Wii Menu
- WiiConnect24
- Everybody Votes Channel
- Mii Contest Channel
- Satellaview
- List of streaming services for the Nintendo Wii
