= TV no Tomo Channel =

TV no Tomo Channel G-Guide for Wii
- Developers: Nintendo; HAL Laboratory
- Publisher: Nintendo
- Composer: Jun Ishikawa
- Series: Wii Menu
- Platform: Wii
- Release: JP: March 4, 2008

TV no Tomo Channel: G-Guide for Wii (テレビの友チャンネル Gガイド for Wii, Terebi no Tomo Chan'neru G Gaido for Wii) was a Wii channel that featured an electronic program guide service developed by Nintendo and HAL Laboratory and operated by G-Guide.

The channel was launched on March 4, 2008, exclusively in Japan, and it was available as a free download on the Wii Shop Channel. The service was discontinued on July 24, 2011, due to the end of analog broadcasting in Japan.

It is the only Wii software to ever officially use the console's TV remote control function.

== Overview ==
The channel displayed an electronic programme guide, featuring ongoing and upcoming programme information for all television channels for the selected prefecture and region. Users could select from four categories of channels: terrestrial analogue, terrestrial digital, satellite analogue and satellite digital.

Guide data was retrieved from the G-Guide service, allowing users to check up to a week ahead of television programming. The service also offered detailed information for each programme, such as a description, a list of the cast, aspect ratio and support for subtitles.

== Features ==
=== Search ===
Users could search for upcoming programmes by either entering a keyword or selecting from a list of genres and categories. Programmes that matched the selected criteria would be highlighted.

=== Stamps ===
The channel allowed users to select up to six Mii characters. Each of these would have an 'interest stamp' (気になるスタンプ, Ki ni naru sutanpu) assigned to them. These stamps could be used on upcoming programmes, so that the user could quickly focus on the ones they were interested in. Users could also register their mobile phone number or email address on the channel, allowing them to receive a notification 30 minutes before programmes they had stamped were broadcast. Through WiiConnect24, users could also view programmes registered friends had stamped.

Additionally, there was an option to view online statistics on stamped programmes, which allowed for viewing which programmes were the most popular amongst users and sort the results by groups.

=== TV remote control ===
A unique feature the channel also included allowed users to control their television set through the Wii Remote. Supported features included switching the TV on and off, scrolling through channels, changing the volume level and switching from the Wii signal to a specific channel and back. When not on the Wii mode, information would be provided to the user through the Wii Remote's speaker. This feature was not fully supported by all television sets, being only compatible with those belonging to Sony, Panasonic, Sanyo, Sharp, Fujitsu, Toshiba, NEC, Pioneer, Hitachi, Funai, JVC, Mitsubishi and Aiwa.

This functionality worked by having the console's sensor bar send a signal, which is then reflected off of the wall and detected by the television. The feature was originally intended to be available from the Wii's system settings, as seen from leftover data, but it was not implemented in the end, making this channel the only software to ever use it. The feature was later incorporated on the Wii U, using the GamePad's infrared.

Nintendo later released a TV remote for Premium Club Nintendo members in Japan that was designed to look like a Wii Remote, but because it is a simple TV remote, it cannot be used with a Wii console.

== Shutdown ==
Although the service had originally started as a push towards the country's switch to digital television, scheduled for 2011, it was discontinued at 12:00 JST on 24 July 2011, following the final shutdown of analogue broadcasting, due to the G-Guide service ending support for the no longer active analogue channels.

== See also ==
- Digital television transition in Japan
- Electronic program guide
- Nintendo TVii
- Wii no Ma
