= Nintendo Zone =

Online distribution service

- Logo
- Developer: Nintendo; Denyu-sha
- Type: Online distribution service
- Launched: NA: November 14, 2008; JP: November 27, 2008; EU: April 25, 2012
- Discontinued: NA: August 28, 2016; JP/EU: March 28, 2018
- Platforms: Nintendo DS; Nintendo DSi; Nintendo 3DS
- Status: Offline
- Website: www.nintendo.com/3ds/nintendozone (defunct, redirects to Nintendo's website)

Nintendo Zone was a download service and an extension of the DS Download Station. Users could access content, third-party data, and other services from a hotspot or download station. The service had demos of upcoming and currently available games and may have location-specific content. When the service debuted, users could also connect to the Nintendo Wi-Fi Connection and DSi Shop.

The Nintendo Zone Viewer application allowed the Nintendo DSi and 3DS to detect and use the Nintendo Zone service. This application provided location specific content to users via Nintendo Zone hotspots and was discontinued in 2014.

== History ==
In collaboration with the restaurant chain McDonald's, the service originated in the Kantō, Chūkyō and Kansai regions of Japan. Over 1,000 DS Download Stations in Japan were planned to be converted into Nintendo Zones to enable SpotPass communications. Nintendo Zone content was available at over 29,000 locations in the United States. The service launched in Europe on April 25, 2012 with approximately 25,000 locations. Nintendo announced in July 2013 that the service would receive StreetPass enhancements. The StreetPass Relay Points system was introduced as part of a firmware update to Nintendo 3DS consoles in August 2013. When a 3DS owner visited a Nintendo Zone location, their StreetPass data would have been stored there, then transferred when another owner visited with the same games. The viewer would always remain on even when out of range of a Nintendo Zone.

On December 8, 2011, a 3DS update allowed users to access new Nintendo Zones through a variety of new hotspots. A press release showed that Boingo Wireless teamed up with Nintendo of America to allow users automatic access to the zone within 42 Boingo-serviced airports in North America. This offered a new range of encounters and features without any additional cost.

In December 2013, a new feature was added in celebration of National StreetPass Weekend. This feature combined all Nintendo Zones within North America and allowed users who come across a Nintendo Zone to StreetPass and exchange data with other 3DS users from all around the continent, as opposed to only those 3DS users who have passed by that specific zone. Through this feature, users were able to StreetPass a maximum of 6 users at a time from other parts of North America. This feature helped raise awareness about Nintendo Zone and what it could offer to 3DS users. It encouraged 3DS users to access a nearby zone in order to meet users from other parts of the continent and to gather more StreetPass relay points. Through this feature, many users were able to exchange information and gameplay items with other users. It also encouraged 3DS users who own the same game to initiate item exchanges that each user would be able to take away with them once the event ended.

== Locations ==
North American Nintendo 3DS users were able to access the Nintendo Zone inside these following places: Best Buy, Home Depot, and CrossIron Mills in Canada; and AT&T Retail Store and McDonald's in the USA. Users could find nearby Nintendo Zones by searching for their city or postal code on the Nintendo website.

== DS Download Station ==
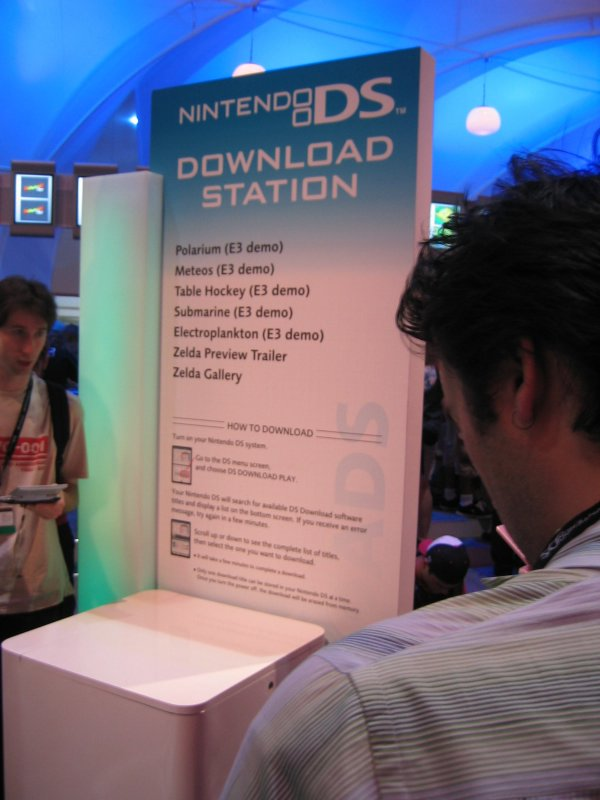
A DS Download Station at E3 2005

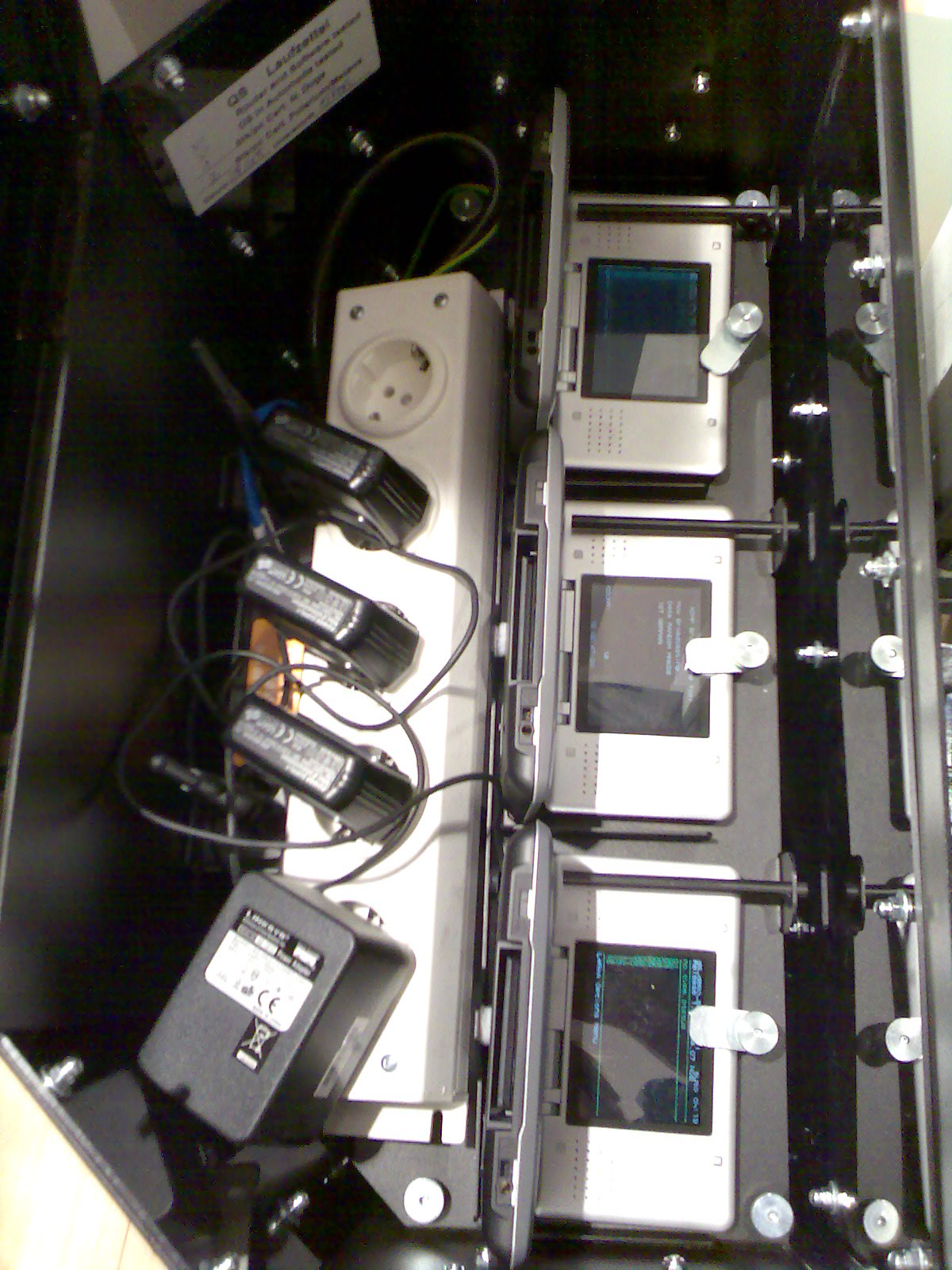
View inside a DS Download Station

The DS Download Station was an in-store demo service launched by Nintendo in early 2006. As the name states, these are stations that can be used to download game demos and trailers to a Nintendo DS. The download station consisted of a standard retail DS hidden inside a box with a special DS Download Station cartridge inserted into it. The cartridge acts as a server for customers to download new content. When Nintendo released a new demo cartridge to retailers, the cartridge could simply be inserted into the DS inside the box.

A DS Download Station could distribute only one game at a time, but could send the demos to up to fifteen DS systems simultaneously. The games could be downloaded by navigating to DS Download Play on the Nintendo DS's main menu and browsing for a DS Download Station in range. Players could choose from a wide range of games that refreshed every quarter of the year. The first game demos released were Tetris DS, Brain Age: Train Your Brain in Minutes a Day!, Mario Kart DS and more. From there, it would load a menu to facilitate loading the demo of the player's choice. The demos remain on the DS until the power is turned off.

The US and European version of the DS Download Station are completely different from the Japanese version. The Japanese version uses three PCs, each connected to an Internet connection. The difference in design was due to most retail locations in the US at the time not having an available Internet connection, and therefore, a self-contained solution was necessary.

There were nineteen volumes of DS Download Station, with each volume differing in content between North America, Europe, and Japan.

The DS Download Station has long since been discontinued, with all the Display DS units being resold in the normal retail market.
