= AOSS =

System for establishing wireless connection

AOSS (AirStation One-Touch Secure System) is a system by Buffalo Technology which allows a secure wireless connection to be set up with the push of a button. AirStation residential gateways incorporated a button on the unit to let the user initiate this procedure. AOSS was designed to use the maximum level of security available to both connecting devices, including both Wired Equivalent Privacy (WEP) and Wi-Fi Protected Access (WPA).

== Connection Process ==
1. Association Phase: Once AOSS has been initiated on both devices via the AOSS button, the access point will change its SSID to "ESSID-AOSS" and the client will attempt to connect to it. Both devices will attempt connection for two minutes. Connection will be made using a secret 64-bit WEP key known to both devices.
2. Key Generation Phase: With both devices connected, the AP generates and transfers a unique key to the client, where an RC4 tunnel is created. The AP creates four SSIDs and encryption keys for AES, TKIP, WEP128, and WEP64 generated from a random key script. These keys are available in the user interface of the AOSS AP to be used with non-AOSS clients.
3. Information Exchange Phase: The client notifies the AP of its encryption support.
4. Key Transfer Phase: All four encryption keys are transmitted to the client regardless of encryption support, allowing the client to change the SSID if needed. The user does not have access to the keys through the client device.
5. Reboot Stack: The AP applies the SSID and key for the highest level of encryption supported by the client and reboots. The previously used WEP64 and RC4 tunnel are no longer used. The client adapter will automatically reboot or re-initialize and connect to the SSID using the proper encryption key.

If a subsequent AOSS process connects with a lesser wireless encryption standard, the AP will apply the lesser standard and the Reboot Stack phase will be repeated for all connected devices.

== Compatible products ==
The Nintendo Wi-Fi Connection used by the Nintendo DS, Nintendo DS Lite, Nintendo DSi and Nintendo 3DS is AOSS compatible. AOSS is also included in the PlayStation 3 and in system software 2.00 for the PlayStation Portable, and is available for automatic setup with the PSP with firmware 2.80. The PS Vita is also AOSS compatible as of release. AOSS functionality for all Wii models is included in version 3.0U of the Wii System software, released in August 2007 along with PAL version 3.0E. The technology was advertised through 2009.

== See also ==
- Wi-Fi Protected Setup
