= Wii Shop Channel =

Online storefront for the Wii video game console (2006–2019)

- Developer: Nintendo Special Planning & Development
- Type: Online shop
- Launched: NA: November 19, 2006; 19 years ago; JP: December 2, 2006; 19 years ago; AU: December 7, 2006; 19 years ago; EU: December 8, 2006; 19 years ago
- Discontinued: WW: January 30, 2019; 7 years ago
- Platform: Wii
- Status: Discontinued (Note: As of February 1, 2019, users can still continue to re-download previously purchased content or transfer Wii data from a Wii to a Wii U through the Wii U Transfer Tool.)
- Website: wiishopchannel.net (interactive archive index)

The Wii Shop Channel was a digital distribution service for the Wii video game console. The service allowed users to purchase and play additional software for the Wii (called Channels), including exclusive games (branded WiiWare), and games from prior generations of video game consoles (marketed with the Virtual Console brand). The Wii Shop Channel launched on November 19, 2006 and was the place to buy additional Wii channels. Most of the Wii Shop Channel's functions were discontinued on January 30, 2019.

The Wii Shop Channel is inaccessible on the Wii Mini. Succeeded by the Nintendo eShop on the Wii U, the Wii Shop Channel was also accessible on the Wii U console though Wii Mode, supporting the download of WiiWare titles, as well as legacy Virtual Console titles that were not available on the Nintendo eShop.

The channel's theme music has become popular and well-received on the Internet, and is often used in Internet memes.

== Wii Points ==
Wii Points were the currency used in transactions on the Wii Shop Channel. Wii Points were purchased by either redeeming Wii Points Cards purchased from retail outlets or directly through the Wii Shop Channel using a Mastercard or Visa credit card. In 2008, Club Nintendo in Europe began offering Wii Points in exchange for "stars" received from registering games and consoles on the website. On March 26, 2018, the ability to purchase and add Wii Points was permanently removed following a temporary maintenance notice; preventing users from purchasing WiiWare or Virtual Console games unless they had enough Wii Points in their account balance. Already purchased software can still be downloaded, and any Wii Points remaining in an account's balance were redeemable until January 30, 2019.

== Virtual Console ==
Mario Bros. as a Virtual Console game on the Wii

Virtual Console was a brand that included games from older video game consoles, which ran under emulation. There were over 300 games available in North America and, as of December 31, 2007, over 10 million games had been downloaded worldwide. All games are exact replicas of the originals with no updated features or graphics, with the exception of Pokémon Snap, which was updated to allow in-game pictures to be posted to the Wii Message Board. New games were added weekly at 9 A.M. Pacific Time every Thursday (previously every Monday) in North America, Tuesdays in Japan and South Korea, and Fridays in Europe, Australia and New Zealand.

In Europe and North America, the Virtual Console featured several import titles which were not previously made available in those respective territories, such as Mario's Super Picross. These games cost 100–300 more points than the normal price due to their import status and some translation work.

Consoles included both Nintendo systems, such as the NES, SNES and N64, and non-Nintendo systems, such as the Sega Genesis, Master System, TurboGrafx-16, MSX, Neo Geo and Commodore 64 (Europe and North America only). Each system had a base starting price for games on that system. All titles ranged from 500 to 1200 Wii Points.

If a person using the now defunct Connection Ambassador Programme reached Gold status (helped 10 people to connect), they would be able to download any Nintendo-published NES game free of charge. Additionally, if they reached Platinum (helped 20 people to connect), they would be able to download any NES, SNES and N64 game in the Virtual console free of charge.

System	Starting cost (Wii Points)
NES/Famicom	500 (600 for Famicom)
Master System	500
Commodore 64 (Europe and North America only)	500
Virtual Console Arcade	500
PC Engine/TurboGrafx-16	600
MSX (Japan only)	700
TurboGrafx-CD/PC Engine CD-ROM²	800
Genesis/Mega Drive	800 (600 in Japan)
SNES/Super Famicom	800
Neo-Geo AES	900
Nintendo 64	1,000

== WiiWare ==
The WiiWare section featured original games specifically designed for Wii. Games were priced between 500 and 1500 points. To decrease the size of the games, instruction manuals were hosted on each game's Wii Shop Channel page. Some titles featured additional downloadable content, priced from 100 to 800 points, that could be purchased using Wii Points in game or from the game's page.

The first WiiWare games were made available on March 25, 2008, in Japan, on May 12, 2008, in North America, and on May 20, 2008, in Europe.

== Wii Channels ==
The Wii Channels section featured additional non-game channels that can be downloaded and used on Wii.

Before the WiiConnect24 service was discontinued, there were three free channels offered worldwide: the Everybody Votes Channel, the Check Mii Out Channel (Mii Contest Channel in Europe), and the Nintendo Channel. An update to the Photo Channel (Photo Channel 1.1) was also available, if not preinstalled. A fourth channel, the Internet Channel, a web browser based on Opera, was available worldwide originally for 500 Wii Points but became available for free starting on September 1, 2009. Anyone who paid the 500 Wii Points for the Internet Channel were refunded. There were also three exclusive free Japanese channels: the Television Friend Channel, which provides channel listing and recording reminder features, the Digicam Print Channel, which allows users to order business cards and photo albums using photos stored on SD cards or the Photo Channel, and Wii no Ma, a service that let users watch videos and order items from their consoles. Previously, a preview channel for Metroid Prime 3: Corruption was available for free in the fall of 2007 for North America and PAL regions before it was removed from the Wii Shop Channel several months after the game's launch. In North America and Europe, the Netflix channel was available in the Wii Channels section, along with the Hulu, Amazon Prime Video, and YouTube channels.

The Wii Channels section in the Wii Shop Channel was originally under the name of WiiWare in North America and Wii Software in Europe, before moving to its own dedicated space when WiiWare launched. These Wii Channels were unavailable on the Wii U console.

== Downloading ==
Selecting the gift option for Pokémon Snap

Software downloaded from the Wii Shop Channel is saved onto the Wii console's internal memory. After a download is complete, the new software appears on the Wii Menu as a channel. Software can be copied to SD cards or re-downloaded for free. Wii consoles with system software version 4.0 and higher can download software directly to SD cards.

On December 10, 2007, a gift feature was added to the Wii Shop Channel, allowing users to purchase and send games and channels to others as gifts. The receiving user was given the option to download or reject the gift upon opening the Wii Shop Channel, with a notification being sent out to the sender if it was accepted. If a user already had the game or if the user did not choose to accept the gift within 45 days, then the gift expired and the Wii Points are returned to the sender. The feature was region locked and incompatible with the Wii U's Nintendo eShop.

== Game updates ==
Some downloaded games could receive updates from the Wii Shop Channel. This was done to update Military Madness, Star Fox 64/Lylat Wars, Kirby 64: The Crystal Shards (in North America and Europe), and Mario Kart 64 (in Europe and Australia). Several NES and SNES games released before March 30, 2007, have also been given updates in Europe and Australia to fix previous problems with the Wii component cables. These updates are free of charge to those who have downloaded a previous version of the game. Some WiiWare games have also featured free updates for the purposes of fixing bugs. These games include Dr. Mario Online Rx and Alien Crush Returns.

== Connection Ambassador Promotion ==
In 2009, Nintendo of Japan launched a program designed to reward users for helping other new users get connected online and to the Wii Shop Channel.

Both the ambassador and the user who was assisted to get their console online received a reward of 500 Wii Points. If the ambassador assisted 20 people, the ambassador would have accumulated 10,000 Wii Points from the programme while attaining Platinum status and be able to download all NES, SNES and N64 titles from the Virtual Console section of the Wii Shop Channel free of charge. The service was also launched in European countries, New Zealand, and Australia. The scheme had proved hugely popular with many sites appearing online dedicated to helping connect users and share system codes.

The programme ended on November 21, 2012.

== Discontinuation ==
On September 29, 2017, Nintendo announced that the Wii Shop Channel would be discontinued on January 30, 2019. To prepare for the closure, the company also announced that the ability to purchase and add Wii Points with a credit card or a Wii Points card would be removed on March 26, 2018.

On January 30, 2019, Nintendo shut down the Wii Shop Channel and removed all WiiWare, Virtual Console games, and other Wii Channels from sale or initial download. The only exceptions are the save data update channel for The Legend of Zelda: Skyward Sword, the Wii U Transfer Tool channel (on Wii consoles), and the Wii System Transfer channel (on Wii U consoles). Users can continue re-downloading any games and apps they acquired before the shutdown, and the ability to re-download previously purchased content or transfer data from a Wii to a Wii U will continue for the foreseeable future. On the day of the closure, the shop's main UI was updated to show its original layout as it appeared when it was first launched back on November 19, 2006, removing the WiiWare option entirely.

Japanese users were able to transfer or refund any remaining Wii Points after the shutdown date from February 21, 2019 until August 31, 2019. The refunded points could be transferred to a local bank account or received as a refund from a convenience store.

== See also ==
- Nintendo eShop
- Xbox Games Store
- PlayStation Store
- Steam
- Lists of Virtual Console games
- Lists of PS one Classics
- List of WiiWare games
- List of downloadable PlayStation games
- WiiWare
- Xbox Live Arcade
- DSi Shop
