= Digital television transition in Japan =

Mandatory switchover from analog to digital terrestrial television broadcasting

The digital television transition in Japan (アナログ放送終了) was the mandatory switchover from analog to digital terrestrial television broadcasting that began in 2008 and continued through early 2012. The switchover itself took place between 24 July 2011 and 31 March 2012, and involved television stations across all five major commercial networks, the entire network of NHK's broadcast transmitters, and television stations that are part of the JAITS group. Japan was the first country in eastern Asia to cease broadcasting television signals in analog.

== Background ==
On 1 December 2003, Tokyo Broadcasting System, TV Asahi, TV Tokyo, Fuji TV and Nippon Television Network- the 5 major TV networks in Tokyo- became the first broadcasters to begin broadcasting in digital. Unlike analog television (which used NTSC-J and relied mainly on VHF signals (channels 1–12) in large markets and UHF signals (channels 13–52) in smaller markets), digital television (which uses ISDB) totally relies on the utilisation of UHF signals. For this reason, the digital channels had to be amended in some areas of the country so that they do not coexist with the then-existing analog channels. This process took place between February 2003 and March 2007.

This was not the first time, however, that digital television began appearing in Japan, as the NHK's Broadcasting Satellite services began broadcasting in digital in December 2000. Those services, however, were open only to those with digital satellite systems. The MUSE Hi-Vision system, which began broadcasting in 1991, was switched off permanently on 30 September 2007, almost four years after the first digital terrestrial broadcasts began.

== Technology ==
Televisions without digital receivers required ISDB-T converter boxes or DVD recorders in order to convert the digital signal into a receivable analog signal. Many of the old analog-era devices had standard image quality, but the digital televisions and tuners that were distributed in the first few years of digital terrestrial broadcasts were only usable for a limited amount of time. As a result of this, the initial cost of digital equipment was expensive; in mid-2007, the Ministry of Internal Affairs and Communications requested television manufacturers to release specialized digital tuners for around ¥5,000 or lower.

Although digital television tuners became widely available to the general population, low income households could not afford the cost of the tuners themselves, even after the prices of the tuners themselves decreased between 2008 and 2010. The ministry responded by distributing tuners free of charge to all low income households; this prevented a situation that would have been similar to the coupon-eligible converter box program during the 2009 digital switchover in the United States. Unlike the United States, however, new antenna equipment was also required on the top of any building that was equipped with a digital television tuner. This led to reception issues in the months preceding the planned switchover. Digital broadcasts could be received with little or no issues within the transmission error's processing capability, but could not be received at all if this capability is exceeded.

== Process ==
As a result of the confusion that was arisen with regards to the transmission of the analog and digital broadcast signals at the same time, the Ministry of Internal Affairs and Communications implemented several measures to ease confusion in the time leading up to the digital switchover. Beginning on 24 July 2008, three years before the planned shutdown of the analog transmitters themselves, a permanent DOG consisting of the word “アナログ” (analog) was placed on the top right corner of the screen to indicate the analog broadcast. This would change as follows:

- July 2008–early 2009: Analog and digital transmissions would look the same with the exception of the permanent DOG indicating the analog broadcast. Graphics would be placed in the 4:3 safe area if presented in widescreen.
- Early 2009–early 2010: The analog signal would begin to be broadcast in a 16:9 letterboxed format until the end of the transition, with the permanent DOG being placed in the top right corner of the letterbox area.
- Early 2010–late 2010: All programs on the analog signal, except for some commercials, would be broadcast in a letterbox format.
- Late 2010–2011: Information regarding the analog signal's shutdown date, as well as telephone numbers set up by the ministry for inquiries, would have to be displayed inside the letterbox areas at all times during all programming, except for some commercials. This would continue until shortly before the shutoff of all analog transmitters.

=== 2008–2009 ===
Between October 2008 and February 2009, the ministry opened up the local digital television call center (デジサポ, Degisapo) service in all 47 prefectures of Japan, which would serve customers who had inquiries about the digital transition. These agencies were available as alternatives to the national service, which itself utilized Navi Dial.

On 6 April 2009, the northeastern portion of Ishikawa Prefecture (corresponding to the cities of Suzu and Noto) was chosen by the ministry as the test market for the digital transition; other areas of the country were expected to conduct similar tests. Periodically throughout the year, analog broadcasts would be suspended for a certain amount of time on some days. Delivery of all digital tuners to the mentioned areas of northeastern Ishikawa was expected to be completed by 30 November 2009.

=== 2010 ===
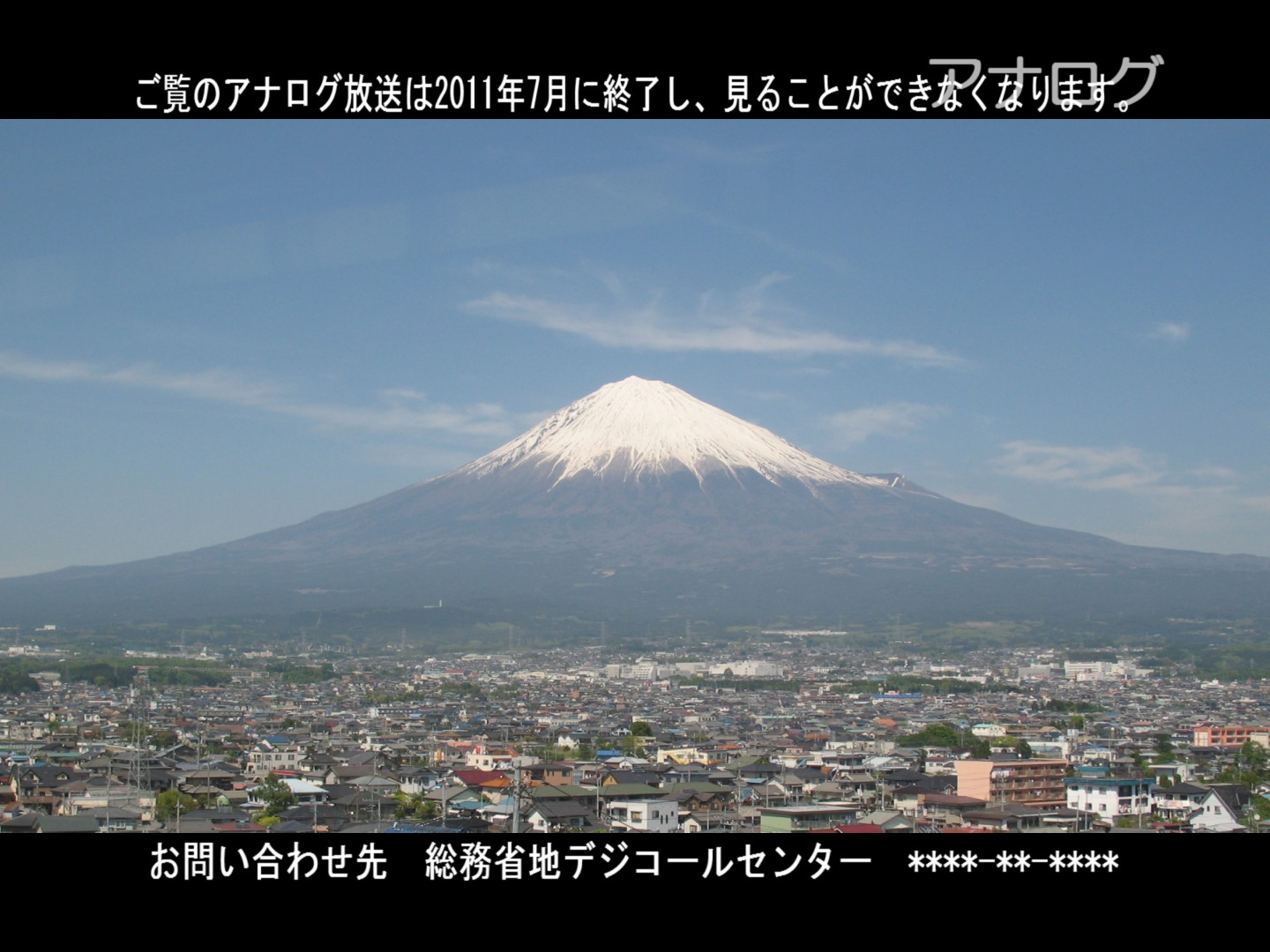
Letterbox format of analog broadcasts used between 2009 and the middle of 2011. Information regarding the digital transition began to appear in the letterbox areas in late 2010.

Beginning on 22 January 2010, analog broadcasts of all commercial television stations in the northeastern part of Ishikawa Prefecture were suspended for a total of 48 hours; KTK, HAB, MRO, and ITC participated in the digital television transition test. NHK was excluded from the test as they were the official conduit of emergency information in the area. On 24 July 2010 at noon, the first phase of the digital switchover began in the northeastern part of Ishikawa Prefecture (which served approximately 8,800 households at the time of digitalization); the auxiliary transmitters of all five television stations serving the area were immediately switched off at that time.

Beginning in September 2010, all television stations were required to display information about the digital television transition in the area of the analog television broadcast that is covered by the letterboxes. This continued until just before noon on the day of the digital switchover, albeit with minor updates being inserted periodically.

=== 2011 ===
==== Tōhoku earthquake reaction ====
The 11 March 2011 earthquake in Tohoku devastated many households in the prefectures of Iwate, Miyagi, and Fukushima, where major power and water outages were reported. Rolling blackouts in some areas of the country that were not seriously affected by the earthquake would take place for the remainder of March; this required the analog auxiliary transmitters in the Kantō region to stop broadcasting for a short period of time. On 22 April 2011, the Ministry of Internal Affairs and Communications announced that the shutdown of analog transmitters in Iwate, Miyagi, and Fukushima prefectures would be postponed for up to a year following the original shutdown date of 24 July 2011 out of respect for the victims of the disaster; the television stations licensed to those three prefectures would be subsidized for half the cost of maintaining the old analog equipment. The final transition date in those areas would be moved to 31 March 2012 per an announcement made on 5 July 2011.

==== Shutdown of analog services ====
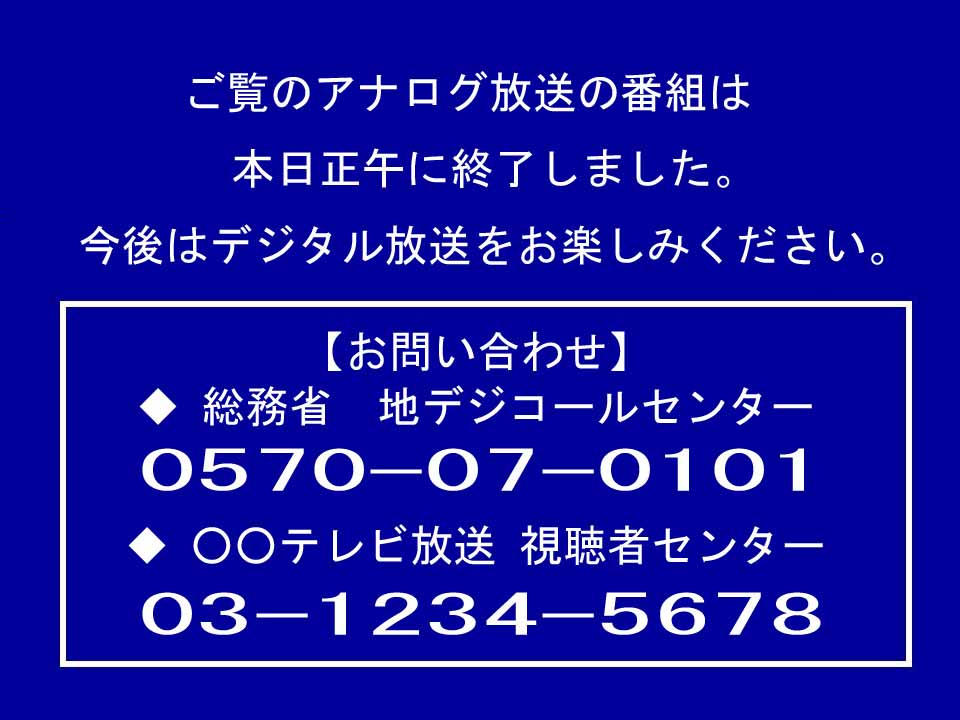
Example of a warning broadcast following the end of regular analog programming

On 1 July 2011, television stations across 44 of the 47 prefectures that were scheduled to shut down their analog services on the original date began displaying a countdown clock in the lower left corner of the screen indicating the number of days remaining until the analog services ended. Seventeen days later, the ministry's digital television call center hours were temporarily extended to accommodate additional inquiries.

On 24 July 2011 at noon, regularly scheduled programming ended on all analog signals in 44 of the country's 47 prefectures, as well as on Wowow and the NHK's BS1 and BS Premium channels (the Open University of Japan shuttered analog broadcasts three days earlier). The end of the transmission of regular programs took place minutes before the start of the third game of the 2011 Nippon Professional Baseball All-Star Series, which was being transmitted by TV Asahi. In addition, special episodes of Waratte Iitomo! (which was aired on Fuji Television) and other variety shows covering the digital transition were aired by other television stations. For independent stations, some of them aired baseball tournament as their last regular programming on analogue. One of dual NNN-FNN stations, Television Oita System ended their broadcasting with a special closing at their master control room. At the stroke of noon, all programming on the analog signal was replaced with a white-on-blue warning message signifying the end of regular programming, as well as the phone numbers of the digital television call center and the television station's inquiry helpline. This message, which varied between stations in different prefectures but maintained the same basic format, was aired continuously for about twelve hours; the transmitters themselves signed off the air shortly before midnight on that day (with stations in most areas airing legal sign-off notices as well). This was necessary because the ministry changed the transmitter shutoff time from noon to midnight due to technical reasons.

=== 2012: Shutdown of analog services in eastern Tōhoku ===
In February 2012, there was a consolidation of digital television call centers in areas where the switchover was already completed.

On 12 March 2012, the sixteen television stations serving the area that was impacted by the 2011 earthquake (Iwate, Miyagi, and Fukushima prefectures) began displaying the aforementioned countdown clock. As with the earlier shutdown, the business hours of the digital television call centers in all three prefectures were temporarily extended as well. When regular programming on the analog signal ended at noon on 31 March 2012, the aforementioned warning messages were still displayed as usual, but there was no fanfare except for those that were broadcast by both NHK and TBC shortly before regular programming ended. At midnight that same day, the analog transmitters themselves switched off, marking the completion of the digital switchover in Japan.

== Cable television ==
Cable television providers across Japan were not initially affected by the digital switchover, as analog cable services were expected to continue for a short amount of time after the transmitters themselves ceased operations. However, some stations that were not part of the country's five major commercial television networks were no longer offered on analog cable after 24 July 2011. By 2015, most analog cable systems ceased operations.

== See also ==
- Media of Japan
