= Check Mii Out Channel =

- Banner of the Check Mii Out Channel
- Developer: Nintendo
- Publisher: Nintendo
- Series: Wii Menu
- Platform: Wii
- Release: November 12, 2007

The Check Mii Out Channel, known as the Mii Contest Channel outside of North America, was a channel for the Nintendo Wii that allowed players to share their digital avatars, called Miis, and enter them into popularity contests.

Nintendo ended support for the Check Mii Out Channel on June 28, 2013, along with four more Wii channels as WiiConnect24, which the channel required, was permanently disconnected.

== Posting Plaza ==
Users were able to submit their Mii(s) for other Mii creators around the world to view. When a Mii was submitted to the Posting Plaza, a twelve-digit entry number was assigned to it (#### - #### - ####), so others could find it using the search function. The submitted Miis were also given two initials by their creator and the Mii's talent.

If a person liked a Mii, it could be imported to his or her Mii Channel plaza. An imported Mii could not be edited, but could have been used in Wii games that use the Mii interface. People could favorite Miis, and the Mii would be given a rank out of five stars, depending on how many people liked the Mii. The artisan was also given a ratings rank of anywhere from one to five stars.

Miis from the Posting Plaza could be imported into Wii Sports Resort which would allow user-created Miis to appear as opponents and spectators in various sports. It would show the initials of the Mii and the player could even check out their entry number. After the discontinuation of the channel, this is no longer possible.

Every month, the Posting Plaza had a "Mii Artisan" ranking section that lasted for the entire month. The first ranking Mii Artisan by the end of the month was declared a "Master Mii Artisan".

== Contests ==
The channel featured a section known as Contests. They were regularly held on the channel and each one had a topic which varied. Players would submit a Mii that they created which potentially fitted the category. Contests would usually last around a week in each phase, and they were categorized as either a National or Worldwide contest.

Players could judge the Miis which were submitted into the contest to have a potential shot of winning. Players would be shown with a set of 10 Miis which were submitted into the contest, and, if they chose to, the set would be shuffled with a new set of 10 Miis. Players would then choose 3 Miis which they thought fitted the category. Additionally, when the Contest Results got announced, the player would then see how well the Miis that they judged performed, and their Judging Eye status would change.

When the Results of the contests got announced, players could see how well their submitted Mii did and how well the Miis that they selected in the Judge section did. Results were portrayed by showing a diorama of a mountain from a scale of 1st level being the lowest to the Summit being the highest and having the better potential to win the contest. After that, the players would then see the submitted Mii which won the contest, and it would then display the Top 50 Miis of the contest.

Special contests were occasionally held throughout the timeline of the Check Mii Out Channel, with some of them mainly being Nintendo related. These contests would usually have a special icon attached to them, and if the user submitted a Mii to the contest, they were given the chance to take a Souvenir Photo along with their personal Mii if the contest contained one.

=== Nintendo-themed contests ===
Theme	Region	Date first seen	Date of results
Mario without his cap	Worldwide	November 11, 2007	November 26, 2007
Luigi without his cap	Worldwide	December 13, 2007	December 26, 2007
A Mii version of Princess Peach	Worldwide	January 24, 2008	February 9, 2008
Wario without a hat	Worldwide	2012	2012
Person who might live in Animal Crossing	Worldwide	2012	2012

== Wii Message Board ==
The Check Mii Out Channel was the first Wii channel that used the Wii message board. When WiiConnect24 was turned on, Nintendo would send a message as soon as new contests began or when a contest update was available, if the user had set up an Internet connection. If a user didn't want to receive these messages from Nintendo, they could opt out by going to the settings in the Check Mii Out Menu or the opt out button when viewing one of the messages that were sent to the Wii console.

== Wii Menu Icon ==
Scrolling headlines of a contest and a picture above it appeared on the Check Mii Out Channel icon when an update to a contest was available.

== Highest Mii Ranking Level and Judging eye ==
These stats were located in the "Mii Artisan Info" section of the Main Menu. The "Highest Mii Ranking" stat showed the highest ranking that the user had ever gotten on a contest, and the "Judging Eye" stat showed the user's most recent ranking for judging. Note that this was the user's most recent judging rank, not the best rank.

== Discontinuation ==
As part of Nintendo's WiiConnect24 service for the Nintendo Wii console, the Check Mii Out Channel / Mii Contest Channel was discontinued alongside the other services offered under WiiConnect24.

A fan-made service called RiiConnect24 (renamed to WiiLink) brought back this service to people who have homebrewed Wiis. It can also be used on Dolphin.
