= Everybody Votes Channel =

Channel on the Nintendo Wii console

- The Everybody Votes Channel start screen
- Developer: Nintendo
- Publisher: Nintendo
- Composer: Toshiyuki Sudo
- Series: Wii Menu
- Platform: Wii
- Release: WW: February 13, 2007

The Everybody Votes Channel was a Wii Menu channel that allowed users to vote in simple opinion polls and compare and contrast opinions with those of friends, family and voters around the globe.

The Everybody Votes Channel was available on February 13, 2007. Its release came as a surprise, as Nintendo made no announcement regarding it until after it was available for download on the Wii Shop Channel.

Nintendo ended support for the Everybody Votes Channel on June 28, 2013, along with four other Wii channels, as WiiConnect24, which the channel required, was disconnected.

== Features ==
The majority of respondents in England, Scotland and Wales believes the egg came first while the majority in Northern Ireland, the Channel Islands and the Isle of Man believes it was the chicken.

Atlantic Canada would prefer living near the Atlantic Ocean while the rest of the country would prefer the Pacific.

The Everybody Votes Channel featured general two-choice poll questions for users to answer. Three regional questions were offered, as well as one or more global polls; after a set time period, a question closed and was replaced by another one. New regional questions were posted every Tuesday, Thursday, and Saturday. Global questions were due to be posted twice a month, although to launch the channel two worldwide questions were released in quick succession.

When accessing the main page of the Everybody Votes Channel, users were initially greeted with the current open polls and had the opportunity to vote with a registered Mii. Users were able to register a total of six different players on each Wii console using Miis to represent individuals in the household. The Channel recorded all of the votes cast by a player and allowed one to compare one's own opinions with those of one's family.

Within hours of a poll's closing, the results of the poll were made available. Vote ratios for each question were displayed on the Channel using Miis to represent different votes. A pie chart was used with 200 Miis to show how the vote panned out. Furthermore, for regional polls, a geographic breakdown was shown of which options were most popular in different areas; for example, a UK user would be shown results for Scotland, England, Wales, Northern Ireland and the Isle of Man, and in the US, the results of all 50 states and Puerto Rico were shown. These results were displayed on a map, with hues that indicated which option received the majority vote in each region. The hue was a deeper shade if the majority was more pronounced.

The previous twelve polls that a user had voted on were archived so that one could check back on them after the polls had closed.

=== Statistics ===
In addition to casting a vote, users could also predict the outcome of the poll. Every correct prediction would be added to the player's profile and used to calculate how "tuned in" the player was with general public opinion, which was shown in the "How Tuned In Are You?" section. This number could range from 0 to 500, and was expressed as a "distance" from public opinion.

The channel used Mii gender data to determine whether the player was male or female. Additionally, the user may have seen the percentages of votes in the two gender groups, which regions had the most popular vote, and prediction accuracy.

=== Worldwide polls ===
As well as the regional questions outlined above, the Everybody Votes Channel also featured worldwide poll questions. Worldwide polls were posted twice a month and ran for approximately two weeks, with live result updates that appeared within hours after the vote had closed.

The results for worldwide polls were shown in a different format to regional polls. While Miis were used to illustrate the global vote ratio, a bar graph showed the results for each different country globally. Players could sort these results by vote percentage, country or in order of prediction accuracy.

=== Suggest a Question ===
The Suggest a Question section allowed players to suggest a poll question along with two possible answers to the question that they would like to see on the service. Each player was allowed one suggestion per day. Nintendo might have considered the question for future polls. These questions could not contain any personal, political, or religious information.

=== Wii Menu icon ===
The Everybody Votes Channel icon on the main Wii Menu has the most recent question and possible answers scrolling over the top. However, it only shows the National Polls; new Worldwide Polls do not show up on the icon. This lets users identify whether there has been a new question (and results) posted without entering the channel. The Everybody Votes Channel was the first channel to feature such an icon, which has since become a standard. The Forecast Channel, News Channel and Wii Shop Channel have since been updated to display a weather icon, news ticker, and new downloads, respectively.

== Reception ==
IGN's Mark Bozon said "As a quick time-waster, Everybody Votes is a decent addition to the Wii console." According to the developers of the channel, the first worldwide poll received 500,000 votes in two days. Japan's first national poll received about 100,000 votes.

== See also ==
- Opinion poll
- Miitomo, another Nintendo application which allows users to answer random questions and compare them amongst friends.
