= List of video games that support Wii Balance Board =

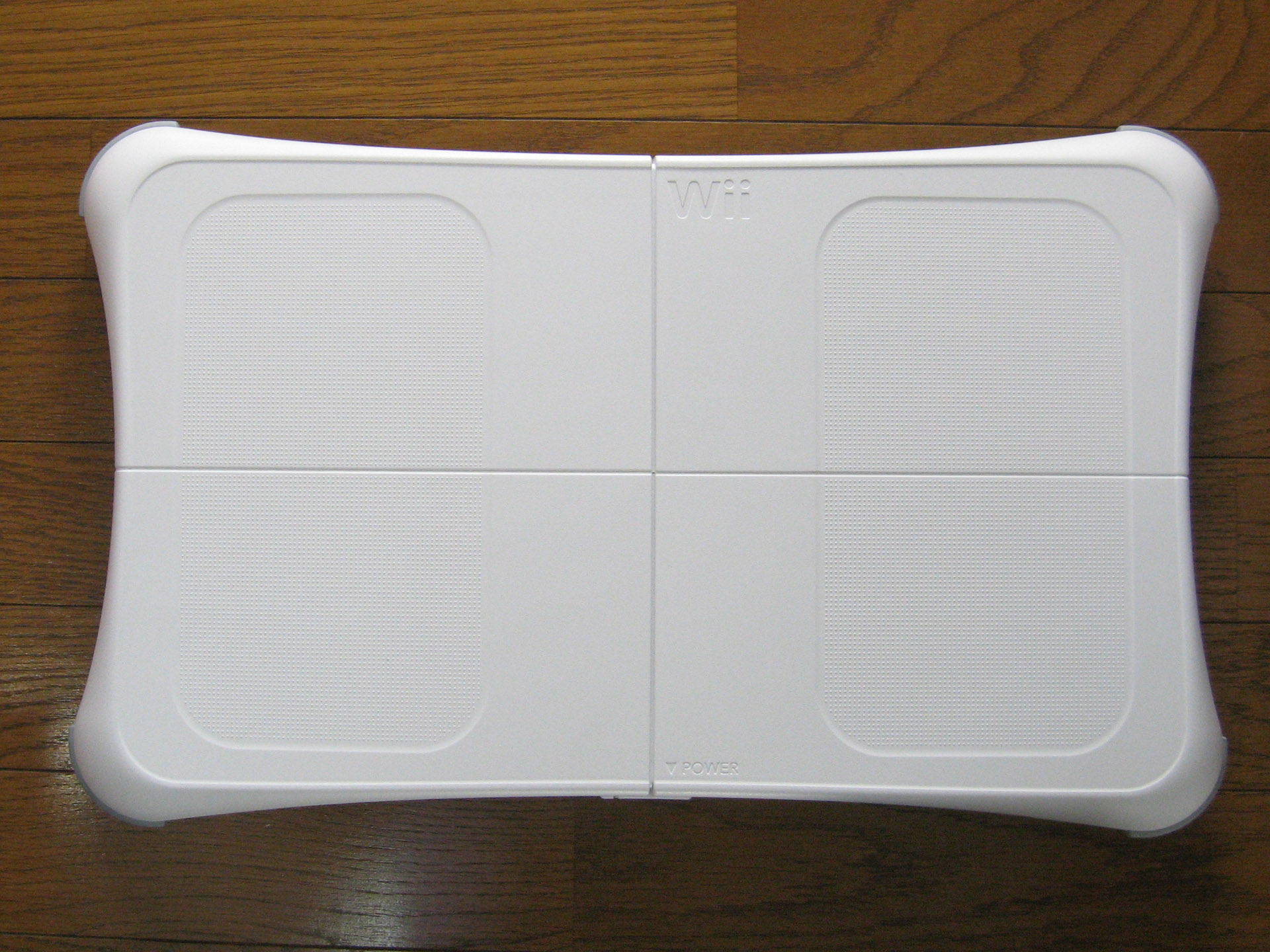
The Wii Balance Board

This is a list of released video games for the Wii and Wii U video game consoles which allow use of the Wii Balance Board accessory. The first game to support this accessory is Wii Fit.

There are 116 games which support the Wii Balance Board.

== Wii ==
Title	Developer	Publisher	Release date N. America	Release date Europe	Release date Japan
10 Minute Solution	Seamless Entertainment	Activision	June 29, 2010	August 27, 2010	—N/a
Academy of Champions: Soccer; Academy of Champions ^{EU}	Ubisoft Vancouver	Ubisoft	November 3, 2009	September 4, 2009	—N/a
Aladin Magic Racer	Hydravision Entertainment	Red Wagon Games^{NA} BigBen Interactive/Neko Entertainment^{EU}	August 2011	April 30, 2010	—N/a
All Star Cheer Squad; All Star Cheerleader ^{EU}	Gorilla Systems Corp.	THQ	October 27, 2008	March 30, 2009	—N/a
All Star Cheer Squad 2 All Star Cheerleader 2 ^{EU}	Gorilla Systems Corp.	THQ	October 27, 2009	November 6, 2009	—N/a
Arthur and the Revenge of Maltazard	Avalanche Productions	Ubisoft	—N/a	December 10, 2009	—N/a
Baby and Me	Sonic Powered	505 Games	—N/a	October 9, 2009	—N/a
Big Beach Sports 2	Jet Black Games	THQ	June 18, 2010	June 24, 2010	—N/a
The Biggest Loser^{NA} The Biggest Loser USA^{EU}	Blitz Games	THQ	October 6, 2009	November 13, 2009	—N/a
The Biggest Loser Challenge	Blitz Games	THQ	November 4, 2010	November 12, 2010	—N/a
Billy's Boot Camp: Wii de Enjoy Diet!	Rocket Company	Rocket Company	—N/a	—N/a	April 21, 2011
Champion Jockey: G1 Jockey & Gallop Racer	Koei	Tecmo Koei	November 8, 2011	September 2, 2011	September 22, 2011
Charm Girls Club Pajama Party	Pipeworks Software	Electronic Arts	October 20, 2009	October 28, 2009	—N/a
Circus	Artematica	505 Games	—N/a	May 7, 2010	—N/a
Dance Dance Revolution Hottest Party 3	Konami	Konami	October 27, 2009	June 4, 2010	—N/a
Dance Dance Revolution Music Fit	Konami	Konami	—N/a	—N/a	January 28, 2010
Dance Dance Revolution^{NA} Dance Dance Revolution Hottest Party 4^{EU}	Konami	Konami	November 16, 2010	May 6, 2011	—N/a
Dance! It's Your Stage	Sproing	DTP Young Entertainment	—N/a	August 6, 2010	—N/a
Daisy Fuentes Pilates	Sega	Sega			
Diva Girls: Diva Ballerina	Arc System Works/DEL	505 Games	—N/a	April 23, 2010	—N/a
Diva Girls: Divas on Ice^{NA} Diva Girls: Princess on Ice^{EU}	Arc System Works	505 Games	June 16, 2009	April 9, 2009	
Doctor Fizzwizzle's Animal Rescue	Replay Games/Steel Penny Games	Conspiracy Entertainment	October 21, 2009	—N/a	—N/a
Don King Boxing	2K Shanghai	2K Sports	March 31, 2009	—N/a	—N/a
Dream Dance & Cheer	CyberPlanet Interactive	Zoo Games	October 13, 2009	—N/a	—N/a
EA Sports Active	EA Vancouver	EA Sports	May 19, 2009	May 22, 2009	August 6, 2009
EA Sports Active: More Workouts	EA Vancouver	EA Sports	November 17, 2009	November 20, 2009	—N/a
EA Sports Active NFL Training Camp	EA Canada	EA Sports	November 16, 2010	—N/a	—N/a
EA Sports Active 2	EA Canada	EA Sports	November 16, 2010	November 19, 2010	—N/a
ExerBeat	Namco Bandai Games	Namco Bandai Games	May 17, 2011	May 27, 2011	—N/a
The Explorer and the Mystery of the Diamond Scarab	Little Chicken Game Company	MAD Multimedia	—N/a	January 24, 2012	—N/a
Family Party: Fitness Fun	Tamsoft	D3 Publisher	September 21, 2010	September 21, 2010	—N/a
Fit & Fun	bitComposer Games	Funbox Media	—N/a	June 24, 2011	—N/a
Fit Music	Oxygene S.r.l.	Oxygene S.r.l.	—N/a	September 30, 2012	—N/a
G1 Jockey Wii 2008	Koei	Koei	—N/a	September 26, 2008	—N/a
The Garfield Show: Threat of the Space Lasagna	Eko Software	Zoo Games^{NA} Morphicon^{EU}	July 8, 2010	June 23, 2010	—N/a
Germany's Next Topmodel 2010	Independent Arts Software	SevenOne Intermedia	—N/a	February 25, 2010	—N/a
Germany's Next Topmodel 2011	Independent Arts Software	SevenOne Intermedia	—N/a	March 18, 2011	—N/a
Der Gesundheitscoach	Independent Arts Software	SevenOne Intermedia	—N/a	March 25, 2010	—N/a
Get Fit with Mel B	Lightning Fish	Deep Silver^{NA} Black Bean Games^{EU}	September 14, 2011	November 26, 2010	—N/a
Girls Life Pyjama Party	—N/a	—N/a	—N/a	—N/a	—N/a
Go Play: Circus Star	Panic Button	Majesco	June 9, 2009	—N/a	—N/a
Go Play: City Sports	Panic Button	Majesco	September 8, 2009	—N/a	—N/a
Go Play: Lumberjacks	Panic Button	Majesco	June 9, 2009	—N/a	—N/a
Go Vacation	Namco Bandai Games	Namco Bandai Games	October 11, 2011	November 4, 2011	October 20, 2011
Gold's Gym: Cardio Workout ^{NA} My Fitness Coach: Cardio Workout ^{EU} Shape Boxing: Wii de Enjoy! Diet ^{JP}	Rocket Company	Ubisoft	March 31, 2009	July 17, 2009	October 30, 2008
Gold's Gym: Dance Workout^{NA} My Fitness Coach: Dance Workout^{EU} Shape Boxing 2: Wii de Enjoy! Diet^{JP}	Land Ho!	Ubisoft	August 17, 2010	August 27, 2010	December 16, 2010
Grease: The Official Video Game	Zoë Mode	505 Games	August 24, 2010	August 27, 2010	—N/a
Hula Wii: Hura de Hajimeru Bi to Kenkou!!	Milestone	Milestone	—N/a	—N/a	October 30, 2008
I'm a Celebrity...Get Me Out of Here!	Smack Down Productions	Mindscape	—N/a	November 6, 2009	—N/a
Ikenie no Yoru	Marvelous Entertainment	Marvelous Entertainment	—N/a	—N/a	March 24, 2011
Imagine Fashion Party; Imagine Fashion Idol ^{EU}	Virtual Toys / Lexis Numerique	Ubisoft	January 20, 2009	February 2, 2009	—N/a
Imagine Party Babyz^{NA} Babysitting Party^{EU}	Visual Impact	Ubisoft	November 11, 2008	November 28, 2008	—N/a
Intervilles	Smack Down Productions	Mindscape	—N/a	July 10, 2009	—N/a
Isometric & Karate Exercise: Wii de Kotsuban Fitness	IE Institute	IE Institute	—N/a	—N/a	December 3, 2009
James Cameron's Avatar: The Game	Ubisoft Montreal	Ubisoft	December 1, 2009	December 4, 2009	—N/a
Jillian Michaels' Fitness Ultimatum 2009	3G Studios	Majesco	October 21, 2008	March 20, 2009	—N/a
Jillian Michaels' Fitness Ultimatum 2010	Collision Studios	Majesco	October 6, 2009	—N/a	—N/a
Jillian Michaels' Fitness Ultimatum 2011	Collision Studios	D3 Publisher	November 16, 2010	—N/a	—N/a
Junior Fitness Trainer	—N/a	—N/a	—N/a	—N/a	—N/a
Kid Fit Island Resort	Selectsoft	Red Wagon Games	October 26, 2010	—N/a	—N/a
Koh-Lanta	Smack Down Productions	Mindscape	—N/a	November 14, 2008	—N/a
Let's Play Ballerina	ZigZag Island	Deep Silver	June 8, 2010	April 23, 2010	—N/a
Marble Saga: Kororinpa; Marbles! Balance Challenge ^{EU} Kororinpa 2: Anthony to Kiniro Himawari no Tane ^{JP}	Hudson Soft	Hudson Soft	March 17, 2009	May 1, 2009	August 6, 2009
Mario & Sonic at the Olympic Winter Games	Sega	Sega	October 13, 2009	October 16, 2009	—N/a
Mini Golf Resort	Trivola		2010		
Minute to Win It	Smack Down Productions	Zoo Games	November 5, 2010	—N/a	—N/a
Mountain Sports	Sproing	Activision	October 27, 2009	October 27, 2009	—N/a
My Ballet Studio	Gimagin	505 Games	November 17, 2009	—N/a	—N/a
My Fitness Coach 2: Exercise and Nutrition	Ubisoft	Ubisoft	January 5, 2010	—N/a	—N/a
My Personal Golf Trainer	Data Design Interactive	XS Games	September 30, 2010	May 28, 2011	—N/a
NewU Fitness First Mind Body, Yoga & Pilates Workout	Lightning Fish	Black Bean Games	—N/a	March 19, 2010	—N/a
NewU Fitness First Personal Trainer	Lightning Fish	Black Bean Games	September 18, 2009	September 18, 2009	September 18, 2009
Nickelodeon Fit	High Voltage Software	2K Play	November 10, 2010	February 18, 2011	—N/a
Playmobil Circus	Morgen Studios	DreamCatcher Interactive^{NA} Mindscape^{EU}	December 21, 2009	June 11, 2010	—N/a
Project Runway	Tornado Studios	Atari	March 2, 2010	June 18, 2010	—N/a
Punch-Out!!	Next Level Games	Nintendo	May 18, 2009	May 22, 2009	—N/a
Rayman Raving Rabbids TV Party	Ubisoft Paris	Ubisoft	November 18, 2008	November 13, 2008	—N/a
Rilakkuma Minna de Goyururi Seikatsu	MTO	MTO	—N/a	—N/a	March 3, 2009
Ringling Bros. and Barnum & Bailey Circus^{NA} It's My Circus^{EU}	Cat Daddy Games	2K Games	November 10, 2009	March 19, 2010	—N/a
Scrabble Interactive: 2009 Edition	Wizarbox	Ubisoft	—N/a	October 2, 2009	—N/a
Shaun White Skateboarding	Ubisoft Montreal	Ubisoft	October 24, 2010	October 29, 2010	—N/a
Shaun White Snowboarding: Road Trip	Ubisoft Montreal	Ubisoft	November 16, 2008	November 13, 2008	—N/a
Shaun White Snowboarding: World Stage	Ubisoft	Ubisoft	November 8, 2009	November 13, 2009	—N/a
Shawn Johnson Gymnastics	Artefacts Studio	Zoo Games	November 16, 2010	—N/a	—N/a
Skate City Heroes	Zeroscale	Zoo Games	November 24, 2008	April 17, 2009	—N/a
Skate It	EA Montreal	Electronic Arts	November 19, 2008	November 20, 2008	—N/a
Ski and Shoot^{NA} RTL Biathlon 2009^{EU}	49Games	Conspiracy Entertainment^{NA} RTL Games^{EU}	December 9, 2008	November 27, 2008	—N/a
Sled Shred featuring the Jamaican Bobsled Team	Just for Fun Studios	SouthPeak Games	October 12, 2010	—N/a	—N/a
Sleepover Party^{NA} Girls Life Sleepover Party^{EU}	Zoë Mode	Ubisoft	January 12, 2010	January 12, 2010	—N/a
Summer Stars 2012	49Games	Deep Silver	July 10, 2012	June 1, 2012	—N/a
Super Monkey Ball: Step & Roll	Sega	Sega	February 9, 2010	February 12, 2010	February 25, 2010
Survivor		Valcon	October 19, 2010		
Team Elimination Games^{NA} Knockout Party^{EU}	Hydravision Entertainment	Ubisoft	November 10, 2009	November 6, 2009	—N/a
Tetris Party Deluxe	Majesco	Hudson Soft / Tetris Online	June 1, 2010	September 3, 2010	—N/a
Tiger Woods PGA Tour 12: The Masters	EA Tiburon	EA Sports	March 29, 2011	April 1, 2011	—N/a
Tokyo Friend Park II Ketteiban: Minna de Chousen! Taikan Attraction	Spike	Spike	—N/a	—N/a	December 3, 2009
Triple Crown Championship Snowboarding	Destineer	Destineer	February 16, 2010	—N/a	—N/a
UFC Personal Trainer	Heavy Iron Studios	THQ	July 12, 2011	July 22, 2011	—N/a
Vacation Isle: Beach Party	FarSight Studios	Warner Bros. Interactive Entertainment	June 8, 2010	June 18, 2010	—N/a
Vertigo	Icon Games	Playlogic Entertainment	June 16, 2009	May 8, 2009	—N/a
Walk It Out^{NA} Step to the Beat^{EU}	Konami	Konami	January 12, 2010	March 26, 2010	—N/a
Water Sports	Frontline Studios	GameMill Entertainment	October 27, 2009	February 26, 2010	—N/a
We Dare	Ubisoft Milan	Ubisoft	—N/a	March 14, 2011	—N/a
We Ski; Family Ski ^{EU}	Namco Bandai	Namco Bandai	May 13, 2008	June 13, 2008	January 31, 2008
We Ski & Snowboard; Family Ski & Snowboard ^{EU}	Namco Bandai	Namco Bandai	March 3, 2009	February 27, 2009	November 13, 2008
Wii Fit	Nintendo EAD	Nintendo	May 21, 2008	April 25, 2008	December 1, 2007
Wii Fit Plus	Nintendo EAD	Nintendo	October 4, 2009	October 30, 2009	October 1, 2009
Wii Music	Nintendo EAD	Nintendo	October 20, 2008	November 14, 2008	October 16, 2008
Winter Blast: Snow & Ice Games	Destineer	Destineer	February 23, 2010	—N/a	—N/a
Winter Sports 2: The Next Challenge; RTL Winter Sports 2009 ^{EU}	49Games	Conspiracy Entertainment	November 25, 2008	December 4, 2008	—N/a
Winter Sports 2011: Go for Gold	49Games	DTP Entertainment	—N/a	November 26, 2010	—N/a
Winter Sports 2012: Feel the Spirit	Interactive Arts	DTP Entertainment	—N/a	December 6, 2011	—N/a
Winter Stars	49Games	Deep Silver	November 18, 2011	November 25, 2011	—N/a
World Championship Athletics^{NA} Summer Athletics 2009^{EU}	49Games	Conspiracy Entertainment^{NA} DTP Entertainment^{EU}	August 4, 2009	August 7, 2009	—N/a
World Party Games^{NA} World Game Tour^{EU}	Nurogames	DreamCatcher Interactive^{NA} 505 Games^{EU}	December 27, 2009	April 23, 2010	—N/a
Yoga	Trine Games	DreamCatcher Interactive^{NA} JoWooD Entertainment^{EU}	December 7, 2009	November 27, 2009	—N/a

=== WiiWare ===
Title	Developer	Publisher	Release date N. America	Release date Europe	Release date Japan
Copter Crisis	Digital Leisure	Digital Leisure	November 30, 2009	November 27, 2009	—N/a
Equilibrio	DK Games	DK Games	April 6, 2009	April 10, 2009	—N/a
Horizon Riders	Sabarasa	Sabarasa	June 10, 2011	July 26, 2012	—N/a
The Incredible Maze	Digital Leisure	Digital Leisure	October 20, 2008	October 24, 2008	—N/a
Manic Monkey Mayhem	Code Monkeys	Code Monkeys	May 24, 2010	November 6, 2009	—N/a
Overturn	Studio Zan	Studio Zan^{NA} Gamebridge^{EU}	August 3, 2009	February 12, 2010	December 2, 2008
Physiofun Balance Training	Kaasa Solution	Kaasa Solution	—N/a	September 10, 2010	—N/a
Rock N' Roll Climber	Vitei	Nintendo	August 12, 2009	—N/a	—N/a
Sekai no Omoshiro Party Game	SIMS	SIMS	—N/a	—N/a	April 20, 2010
Sekai no Omoshiro Party Game 2	SIMS	SIMS	—N/a	—N/a	May 11, 2010
Snowboard Riot	Hudson Soft	Hudson Soft	February 2, 2009	February 27, 2009	February 10, 2009
Step Up	GolemLabs	Zoozen	November 10, 2011	—N/a	—N/a
Tetris Party	Hudson Soft	Hudson Soft^{JP} Tetris Online^{NA/EU}	October 20, 2008	October 24, 2008	October 14, 2008

== Wii U ==
Title	Developer	Publisher	Release date N. America	Release date Europe	Release date Japan
Silver Falls - White Inside Its Umbra	Sungrand Studios	Sungrand Studios	February 16, 2023	—N/a	—N/a
Wii Fit U	Nintendo EAD	Nintendo	November 1, 2013	November 1, 2013	October 31, 2013

=== Unreleased ===
- Stratusphere Yoga
- Yoga
