= List of video games featuring Miis =

This is a list of video games that use Mii avatars, sorted by console.

Key	Region
AUS	Australasia
EU	Europe
JP	Japan
KO	South Korea
NA	North America

Indicates that a game has been discontinued and/or it is no longer obtainable.

== Wii ==
=== Retail games ===
There are 81 games included in the list.

Title	Year	Genre	Developer	Publisher	Available	Use	Required?	Ref.
Active Life: Explorer (NA); Family Trainer: Treasure Adventure (PAL)	2010	Sports/fitness	Bandai		^{AUS, EU, KO, NA}	Playable character	Yes	
Active Life: Extreme Challenge (NA); Family Trainer: Extreme Challenge (PAL)	2009	Sports/fitness	Bandai		^{AUS, EU, KO, NA}	Playable character	Yes	
Active Life: Outdoor Challenge (NA); Family Trainer (PAL)	2008	Sports/fitness	Bandai		^{AUS, EU, KO, NA}	Playable character	Yes	
Animal Crossing: City Folk (NA); Animal Crossing: Let's Go To The City (PAL)	2008	Life simulation	Nintendo EAD	Nintendo	^{AUS, EU, JP, NA}	Facial makeover for the player's character	No	
Band Hero	2009	Music	Vicarious Visions	Activision	^{AUS, EU, NA}	Playable character	No	
Big Brain Academy: Wii Degree (NA); Big Brain Academy for Wii (PAL)	2007	Puzzle, educational	Nintendo EAD	Nintendo	^{AUS, EU, JP, NA}	Save icon and students	Yes	
Bomberman Blast	2008	Action game	Hudson Soft		^{JP}	Playable character	No	
Data East Arcade Classics	2010	Retro compilation	Majesco		^{NA}	Player icon	No	
Dance Dance Revolution Hottest Party 2	^{NA, JP}2008^{PAL}2009	Music	Konami		^{EU, JP, NA}	Playable/background character	No	
Dance Dance Revolution Disney Grooves	2009	Music	Konami		^{NA}	Playable/background character	No	
Deal or No Deal	2009	Game show	Black Lantern Studios	Zoo Games	^{NA}	Playable character's face	No	
Disney Channel All Star Party	2010	Party	Page 44 Studios	Disney Interactive Studios	^{AUS, EU, NA}	Playable/background character	Yes	
Family Game Night 2	2009	Tabletop	Hasbro	EA	^{AUS, EU, NA}	Playable character	Yes	
Family Game Night 3	2010	Tabletop	Hasbro	EA	^{AUS, EU, NA}	Playable character	Yes	
FIFA 08	2007	Sports	EA Sports	EA	^{AUS, EU, KO, NA}	Playable character	Yes	
FIFA 09 All-Play	2008	Sports	EA Sports	EA	^{AUS, EU, NA}	Playable/background character	Yes	
Fortune Street (NA); Boom Street (PAL)	^{WW}2011^{AUS}2012	Tabletop	Marvelous	^{JP}Square Enix^{WW}Nintendo	^{AUS, EU, NA, JP}	Playable character	No	
Go Vacation	2011	Variety	Namco Bandai Games	Namco	^{AUS, EU, NA}	Playable character	No	
Guitar Hero 5	2009	Rhythm	Vicarious Visions	Activision	^{AUS, EU, NA}	Playable character	No	
Guitar Hero World Tour	2008	Rhythm	Vicarious Visions	Activision	^{AUS, EU, NA}	Playable character	No	
Jeopardy!	2010	Trivia	Pipeworks Software	THQ	^{NA}	Playable character	No	
Jikkyō Powerful Pro Yakyū Wii	2007	Sports	Konami/Pawapuro Production	Konami	^{JP}	Playable character	No	
Jissen Pachi-Slot Pachinko Hisshôhô! Hokuto no Ken Wii	2007	Pachinko	Sammy	Sega	^{JP}	Save icon	No	
Link's Crossbow Training	^{WW}2007^{JP}2008	Shooter	Nintendo EAD	Nintendo	^{AUS, EU, JP, NA}	Player icon	No	
Madden NFL 08	2007	Sports	EA Sports	EA	^{AUS, EU, NA}	Player icon	No	
Madden NFL 09 All-Play	2008	Sports	EA Sports	EA	^{AUS, EU, NA}	Player icon, referee, John Madden	No	
Madden NFL 10	2009	Sports	EA Sports	EA	^{AUS, EU, NA}	Player icon	No	
Mario & Sonic at the Olympic Games	2007	Sports	Sega	Sega; Nintendo^{JP, KO}	^{AUS, EU, JP, KO, NA}	Playable character	No	
Mario & Sonic at the Olympic Winter Games	2009	Sports	Sega	Sega; Nintendo^{JP, KO}	^{AUS, EU, JP, KO, NA}	Playable character	No	
Mario & Sonic at the London 2012 Olympic Games	2011	Sports	Sega	Sega; Nintendo^{JP, KO}	^{AUS, EU, JP, KO, NA}	Playable character	No	
Mario Kart Wii	2008	Racing	Nintendo EAD	Nintendo	^{AUS, EU, JP, NA}	Background, playable character, save icon	Yes	
Mario Party 8	2007	Party	Hudson Soft	Nintendo	^{AUS, EU, JP, NA}	Background, playable character, save icon	Yes	
Mario Sports Mix	^{JP}2010^{WW}2011	Sports	Square Enix	Nintendo	^{AUS, EU, JP, NA}	Background, playable character, save icon	Yes	
Mario Strikers Charged (NA); Mario Strikers Charged Football (PAL)	^{WW}2007^{KO}2010	Sports	Next Level Games	Nintendo	^{AUS, EU, JP, NA}	Save icon	No	
Mario Super Sluggers	2008	Sports	Namco Bandai	Nintendo	^{JP, NA}	Playable character	No	
Metroid Prime 3: Corruption	^{WW}2007^{JP}2008	Adventure	Retro Studios	Nintendo	^{AUS, EU, JP, NA}	Save icon, in-game bobblehead	Yes	
Metroid Prime: Trilogy	2009	Adventure	Retro Studios	Nintendo	^{AUS, EU, JP, NA}	Save icon, in-game bobblehead	Yes	
MLB Power Pros	2007	Sports	Konami/Pawapuro Production	2K Sports	^{JP, NA}	Playable character	No	
MLB Power Pros 2008	2008	Sports	Konami/Pawapuro Production	2K Sports	^{JP, NA}	Playable character	No	
Namco Museum Megamix	2010	Retro compilation	Namco	Namco Bandai	^{NA}	Playable character in multiplayer mode for one game	No	
Namco Museum Remix	^{NA, JP}2007^{PAL}2008	Retro compilation	Namco	Namco Bandai	^{AUS, EU, JP, KO, NA}	Playable character in multiplayer mode for one game	No	
NBA Live 08	2007	Sports	EA Sports	Electronic Arts	^{AUS, EU, NA}	Coach in play now mode	No	
NBA Live 09 All-Play	2008	Sports	EA Sports	Electronic Arts	^{AUS, EU, NA}	Playable character	No	
NCAA Football 09 All-Play	2008	Sports	EA Sports	Electronic Arts	^{NA}	Player icon	No	
NHK Kohaku Quiz Kassen	2009	Trivia	Nintendo EAD	Nintendo	^{JP}	Playable character	Yes	
NHL 2K10	2009	Sports	Visual Concepts	2K Sports	^{NA, PAL}	Playable character	Yes	
Pro Evolution Soccer 2008	2008	Sports	Konami		^{AUS, EU, JP, NA}	Playable character	No	
Pro Evolution Soccer 2009	2009	Sports	Konami		^{AUS, EU, JP, NA}	Playable character	No	
Punch-Out!!	2009	Sports	Next Level Games	Nintendo	^{AUS, EU, JP, NA}	Save icon	Yes	
Rhythm Heaven Fever (NA); Beat the Beat: Rhythm Paradise (PAL)	^{JP}2011^{WW}2012^{KO}2013	Rhythm	Nintendo	Nintendo	^{AUS, EU, JP, NA}	Player icon	No	
Samba de Amigo	2008	Rhythm	Gearbox Software, Sonic Team	Sega	^{AUS, EU, JP, NA}	Background character, player icon	No	
Smarty Pants	2007	Trivia, educational	Planet Moon Studios	EA	^{AUS, EU, NA}	Playable character	No	
Sonic Colors	2010	3D platformer	Sonic Team	Sega	^{AUS, EU, JP, NA}	Playable character in multiplayer mode	No	
Sonic Unleashed	2008	3D platformer	Dimps	Sega	^{AUS, EU, JP, NA}	Save icon	No	
Sonic & Sega All-Stars Racing	2010	3D kart racer	Sumo Digital	Sega	^{AUS, EU, NA}	Playable character, save icon	No	
Super Mario Galaxy	2007	3D platformer	Nintendo EAD	Nintendo	^{AUS, EU, JP, NA}	Save icon	No	
Super Mario Galaxy 2	2010	3D platformer	Nintendo EAD	Nintendo	^{AUS, EU, JP, NA}	Save icon	No	
Super Smash Bros. Brawl	2008	Fighting	Sora Ltd.	Nintendo	^{AUS, EU, JP, NA}	Wi-Fi player icon	No	
Taiko no Tatsujin Wii	2008	Rhythm	Namco	Namco Bandai Games	^{JP}	Player icon, dancing characters	No	
Taiko no Tatsujin Wii: Do Don to 2 Daime	2009	Rhythm	Namco	Namco Bandai Games	^{JP}	Player icon, dancing characters	No	
Taiko no Tatsujin Wii: Minna de Party 3 Daime	2010	Rhythm	Namco	Namco Bandai Games	^{JP}	Player icon, dancing characters	No	
Taiko no Tatsujin Wii: Kettei-Ban	2011	Rhythm	Namco	Namco Bandai Games	^{JP}	Player icon, dancing characters	No	
Tetris Party Deluxe	2010	Puzzle game	Hudson Soft		^{AUS, EU, JP, NA}	Playable character	Yes	
Tiger Woods PGA Tour 09 All-Play	2008	Sports	EA Sports	Electronic Arts	^{AUS, EU, NA}	Player icon	No	
Tiger Woods PGA Tour 10	2009	Sports	EA Sports	Electronic Arts	^{AUS, EU, NA}	Player icon	No	
TV Show King Party	2008	Quiz game, party	Gameloft		^{AUS, EU, NA}	Playable character	Yes	
WarioWare: Smooth Moves	^{JP}2006^{WW}2007	Minigames	Intelligent Systems	Nintendo	^{AUS, EU, JP, KO, NA}	Playable character	No	
We Love Golf!	^{JP}2007^{WW}2008	Sports	Camelot	Capcom	^{EU, JP, NA}	Playable character	No	
We Ski	2008	Sports	Namco	Namco Bandai	^{EU, JP, NA}	Playable character	No	
We Ski & Snowboard	^{JP}2008^{WW}2009	Sports	Namco	Namco Bandai	^{AUS, EU, JP, NA}	Playable character	No	
Wheel of Fortune	2010	Game show	Pipeworks Software	THQ	^{NA}	Playable character	No	
Wii Fit	^{JP}2007^{WW}2008	Exergaming	Nintendo EAD	Nintendo	^{AUS, EU, JP, NA}	Playable character, background characters, save icon	Yes	
Wii Fit Plus	2009	Exergaming	Nintendo EAD	Nintendo	^{JP, NA}	Playable character, background characters, save icon	Yes	
Wii Music	2008	Rhythm	Nintendo EAD	Nintendo	^{AUS, EU, JP, NA}	Playable character, background characters	Yes	
Wii Party	2010	Party	Nintendo Cube	Nintendo	^{AUS, EU, JP, NA}	Playable character, background characters	Yes	
Wii Play	^{WW}2006^{NA}2007	Minigames	Nintendo EAD	Nintendo	^{AUS, EU, JP, KO, NA}	Playable character, background characters	Yes	
Wii Play Motion	2011	Minigames	Nintendo EAD	Nintendo	^{AUS, EU, JP, KO, NA}	Playable character, background characters	Yes	
Wii Sports	2006	Sports	Nintendo EAD	Nintendo	^{AUS, EU, JP, KO, NA}	Playable character, background characters	Yes	
Wii Sports Resort	2009	Sports	Nintendo EAD	Nintendo	^{AUS, EU, JP, NA}	Playable character, background characters	Yes	
WWE SmackDown vs. Raw 2008	^{WW}2007^{JP}2008	Sports	Yuke's	THQ	^{AUS, EU, JP, NA}	Player icon	No	
WWE SmackDown vs. Raw 2009	2008	Sports	Yuke's	THQ	^{AUS, EU, JP, NA}	Player icon	No	

=== WiiWare titles ===
There are 26 games included in the list. These games are no longer possible to obtain after the Wii Shop Channel shut down on January 30, 2019.

Title	Year	Genre	Developer	Publisher	Available	Use	Required?	Ref.
AquaSpace	2010	Digital pet	Paon	Nintendo	^{AUS, EU, JP, NA}	Playable character	No	
Bejeweled 2	2010	Puzzle game	PopCap Games		^{AUS, EU, NA}	Player icon	No	
Bomberman Blast	2008	Action game	Hudson Soft		^{AUS, EU, JP, NA}	Playable character	No	
Brain Challenge	2008	Edutainment	Gameloft		^{AUS, EU, JP, NA}	Player icon	No	
Chess Challenge!!	2010	Tabletop	Digital Leisure		^{EU, NA}	Background character	No	
Drill Sergeant Mindstrong	^{JP, NA}2009^{PAL}2010	Party game	HI Corporation	Xseed Games	^{EU, JP, NA}	Playable character	No	
Dr. Mario Online Rx (NA); Dr. Mario & Germ Buster (PAL)	2008	Puzzle game	Arika	Nintendo	^{AUS, EU, JP, NA}	Playable character	No	
Equilibrio	^{NA, PAL}2009^{JP}2010	Puzzle game	DK Games		^{AUS, EU, NA}	Save icon	No	
Family & Friends Party	2009	Minigame compilation	Enjoy Up	Gammick Entertainment	^{AUS, EU, NA}	Unknown	No	
Kotoba no Puzzle: Mojipittan	2008	Puzzle game	Namco		^{JP}	Unknown	No	
Let's Catch	^{JP}2008^{NA, PAL}2009	Sports game	Prope	Sega	^{AUS, EU, JP, NA}	Playable character	No	
MaBoShi: The Three Shape Arcade	2008	Puzzle game	Mindware Corp	Nintendo	^{AUS, EU, JP, NA}	Player icon	No	
Magnetica Twist (NA); Actionloop Twist (PAL)	2008	Puzzle game	Mitchell Corporation	Nintendo	^{EU, JP, NA}	Playable character	No	
My Pokémon Ranch	2008	Digital pet	Ambrella	Nintendo	^{AUS, EU, JP, NA}	Background character	Yes	
Party Fun Pirate (NA); Pop-Up Pirate! (PAL)	^{JP}2008^{WW}2009	Board game	Tomy		^{AUS, EU, JP, NA}	Playable character	No	
Pool Revolution: Cue Sports	2008	Sports game	Hudson Soft		^{AUS, EU, JP, NA}	Unknown	No	
Potpourrii	2008	Puzzle game	Abstraction Games		^{AUS, EU, NA}	Unknown	No	
Snowpack Park	2010	Simulation	Skip Ltd.	Nintendo	^{JP, NA}	Playable character	Yes	
Soccer Up! (NA); Football Up! (PAL)	2011	Sports	EnjoyUP Games		^{NA, EU}	Players, team editor	No	
Tetris Party	2008	Puzzle game	Hudson Soft		^{AUS, EU, JP, NA}	Playable character	Yes	
Texas Hold'em Poker	2009	Card game	Gameloft		^{AUS, EU, NA}	Playable character	No	
Texas Hold'em Tournament	2009	Card game	Digital Leisure		^{AUS, EU, NA}	Playable character	No	
TV Show King	2008	Quiz game, party	Gameloft		^{AUS, EU, JP, NA}	Playable character	Yes	
TV Show King 2	2009	Quiz game, party	Gameloft		^{EU, NA}	Playable character	Yes	
Uno	^{JP, PAL}2009^{NA}2010	Card game	Gameloft		^{AUS, EU, JP, NA}	Playable character	Yes	
Yakuman Wii	2008	Puzzle game	Nintendo		^{JP}	Unknown	No	

=== Non-game applications ===
There are 13 apps included in the list. Eight have been discontinued; Wii no Ma on April 30, 2012, TV no Tomo Channel due to the shutdown of analog television in Japan on July 24, 2011, Check Mii Out Channel, Digicam Print Channel, Everybody Votes Channel and Wii Message Board due to the shutdown of WiiConnect24 on June 27, 2013, Wii Speak Channel due to the shutdown of Nintendo Wi-Fi Connection on May 20, 2014, and Today and Tomorrow Channel, which remained available until the Wii Shop Channel shut down on January 30, 2019. Mii Channel and Wii Message Board are pre-installed on every Wii while Mario Kart Channel and the Wii Fit-related apps remain available to owners of the respective games, though the former has limited functionality after Nintendo Wi-Fi Connection shut down.

Title	Year	Genre	Developer	Publisher	Available	Use	Required?	Ref.
Check Mii Out Channel (NA); Mii Contest Channel (PAL)	2007	Contest	Nintendo		^{JP, NA, EU, AU}	Submissions	Yes	
Digicam Print Channel	2008	Photo album and business card creator	Nintendo		^{JP}	Business card image	No	
Everybody Votes Channel	2007	Polling	Nintendo		^{JP, NA, EU, AU}	Voter avatars	Yes	
Mario Kart Channel	^{WW}2008^{KO}2009	Racing	Nintendo		^{JP, NA, EU, AU}	Background, playable character, save icon	Yes	
Mii Channel	^{NA, JP, AU, EU}2006^{ZA}2007^{KO, TW, IND}2008^{HK}2009	Avatar creator	Nintendo		^{JP, NA, EU, AU}	Mii creation	Yes	
Today and Tomorrow Channel	^{JP}2008^{PAL, KO}2009	Fortune telling	Nintendo		^{JP, EU, AU, KO}	Fortune telling, compatibility test	Yes	
TV no Tomo Channel	2008	Electronic program guide	Nintendo; HAL Laboratory	Nintendo	^{JP}	Stamps	Yes	
Wii Fit Body Check Channel	2009	Fitness	Nintendo		^{JP}	Save icon	Yes	
Wii Fit Channel	^{JP}2007^{WW}2008	Fitness	Nintendo		^{JP, NA, EU, AU}	Body Test avatar	Yes	
Wii Fit Plus Channel	^{WW}2009^{KO}2010	Fitness	Nintendo		^{JP, NA, EU, AU}	Body Test avatar	Yes	
Wii Message Board	^{NA, JP, AU, EU}2006^{ZA}2007^{KO, TW, IND}2008^{HK}2009	Instant messaging	Nintendo		^{JP, NA, EU, AU}	Icon	Yes	
Wii no Ma	2009	Video on demand Online shopping	HAL Laboratory	Nintendo	^{JP}	Family avatars	Yes	
Wii Speak Channel	2008	Voice chat	Nintendo		^{JP, NA, EU}	Avatar	Yes	

== Nintendo DS ==
Since the Nintendo DS lacks a native Mii Maker, the following games support Miis through the ability to import them from a Wii console or, with the exception of Final Fantasy Crystal Chronicles: Echoes of Time, an in-game Mii Maker.

=== Retail games ===
There are four games included in the list.

Title	Year	Genre	Developer	Publisher	Available	Use	Required?	Ref.
Personal Trainer: Walking (NA); Walk with me! Do you know your walking routine? (PAL)	^{JP}2008^{WW}2009	Exergaming	Creatures Inc.	Nintendo	^{AUS, EU, JP, NA}	Playable character	Yes	
Tomodachi Collection	2009	Social simulation	Nintendo SPD	Nintendo	^{JP}	Islanders	Yes	
Final Fantasy Crystal Chronicles: Echoes of Time	2009	RPG	Square Enix	Nintendo SPD	^{AUS, EU, JP, NA}	Mii Mask	No	
Kuruma de DS	2012	Software	Nintendo SPD	Nintendo SPD	^{JP}	Driver and passengers	No	

=== DSiWare titles ===
Only one game is included in the list. This game is no longer possible to obtain after the Nintendo DSi Shop shut down on March 31, 2017.

Title	Genre	Developer	Publisher	Available	Use	Required?	Ref.
Ide Yousuke’s Healthy Mahjong DSi	2009	Mahjong	Nintendo SPD	^{JP}	Playable character	No	

== Nintendo 3DS ==
=== Retail games ===
There are 30 games included in the list.

Title	Year	Genre	Developer	Publisher	Available	Use	Required?	Ref.
Animal Crossing: New Leaf	^{JP}2012^{WW}2013	Life simulation	Nintendo EAD	Nintendo	^{AUS, EU, JP, NA, KO}	Facial makeover for the player's character	No	Nintendo Direct
AR Games: Augmented Reality (Note: Pre-installed on every Nintendo 3DS.)	2011	Minigames; Photography	HAL Laboratory	Nintendo	^{AUS, EU, JP, NA, KO}	AR photography	No	
AKB48+Me	2012	Rhythm	Jupiter	Kadokawa Shoten	^{JP}	Playable character, dancing characters, singing characters, other characters	Yes	
Crosswords Plus	2012	Puzzle	Nintendo		^{NA}	Player icon	No	Trailer
Dillon's Dead-Heat Breakers	2018	Tower defense	Vanpool	Nintendo	^{AUS, EU, JP, NA}	Playable character, supporting characters	Yes	Nintendo Direct
Disney Magical World	^{JP}2013^{WW}2014	Life simulation	h.a.n.d.	Nintendo	^{AUS, EU, JP, NA}	Playable character	No	Nintendo website
Disney Magical World 2	^{JP}2015^{WW}2016	Life simulation	h.a.n.d. Bandai Namco Studios	Nintendo	^{AUS, EU, JP, NA}	Playable character	No	Nintendo website
Kid Icarus: Uprising	2012	Third-person shooter	Project Sora	Nintendo	^{AUS, EU, JP, NA}	Multiplayer icon, save icon, StreetPass icon	No	
Mario Kart 7	2011	Racing	Nintendo EAD; Retro Studios	Nintendo	^{AUS, EU, JP, NA}	Background, playable character, save icon	No	Nintendo website
Mario Tennis Open	2012	Sports	Camelot Software Planning	Nintendo	^{AUS, EU, JP, NA}	Background, playable character	No	Nintendo website
New Super Mario Bros. 2	2012	Platformer	Nintendo		^{AUS, EU, JP, NA}	StreetPass icon	No	Nintendo Direct June 2012
Nintendogs + Cats	2011	Digital pet	Nintendo		^{AUS, EU, JP, NA}	StreetPass icon	No	Nintendo website
Pilotwings Resort	2011	Flight simulation game	Monster Games	Nintendo	^{AUS, EU, JP, NA}	Playable character	Yes	Nintendo website
Pokémon Rumble Blast	2011	Action	Ambrella	Nintendo	^{AUS, EU, JP, NA}	Playable character	No	E3 2011 demos
Pokémon Rumble World	2015	Action	The Pokémon Company	Nintendo	^{AUS, EU, JP, NA}	Player avatar	Yes	Nintendo website
Rhythm Heaven Megamix (NA); Rhythm Paradise Megamix (PAL)	^{JP}2015^{WW}2016	Rhythm	Nintendo		^{AUS, EU, JP, NA, KO}	Playable character, save icon, StreetPass icon, multiplayer icon	Yes	E3 2016 Trailer
Ridge Racer 3D	2011	Racing	Bandai Namco Games		^{AUS, EU, JP, NA}	Player icon	No	
RollerCoaster Tycoon 3D	2012	Construction and management simulation	n-Space	Atari, Inc.	^{AUS, EU, NA}	StreetPass icon	No	
Sonic Generations	2011	Platformer	Dimps	Sega	^{AUS, EU, JP, NA}	Wi-Fi icon	No	
Sonic & All-Stars Racing Transformed	2013	Racing	Sumo Digital	Sega	^{AUS, EU, JP, NA}	Playable character	No	
StreetPass Mii Plaza	2011	RPG, puzzle, shoot 'em up, simulation	Nintendo SDD, Good-Feel, Grezzo, Spike Chunsoft, Prope	Nintendo	^{AUS, EU, JP, NA}	Playable character, supporting characters	Yes	
Super Mario 3D Land	2011	Platformer	Nintendo		^{AUS, EU, JP, NA}	Save icon, StreetPass icon	No	Nintendo website
Tetris: Axis (NA); Tetris (PAL)	2011	Puzzle	Hudson Soft	^{JP}Bandai^{NA}Nintendo^{PAL}Tetris Online	^{AUS, EU, JP, NA}	Playable character	No	Nintendo website
Mario Golf: World Tour	2014	Sports	Camelot Software Planning	Nintendo	^{AUS, EU, JP, NA}	Playable character	No	Nintendo website
Miitopia	^{JP}2016^{WW}2017	RPG	Nintendo		^{AUS, EU, JP, NA}	All characters	Yes	Nintendo Direct
Tomodachi Life	^{JP}2013^{WW}2014	Social simulation	Nintendo		^{AUS, EU, JP, NA}	Islanders	Yes	Nintendo website
Super Smash Bros. for Nintendo 3DS	2014	Fighting	Sora Ltd. Bandai Namco Games	Nintendo	^{AUS, EU, JP, NA}	Playable character, background character	No	E3 2014
Mario & Sonic at the Rio 2016 Olympic Games	2016	Sports	Nintendo		^{AUS, EU, JP, NA}	Playable character, background character	No	Nintendo Direct Japan
Super Mario Maker for Nintendo 3DS	2016	Game creation	Nintendo		^{AUS, EU, JP, NA}	Icon	No	
WarioWare Gold	2018	Minigames	Nintendo		^{AUS, EU, JP, NA}	Playable character, save icon	Yes	

=== Nintendo eShop exclusive titles ===
There are five games included in the list. These games are no longer possible to obtain after the Nintendo eShop for Nintendo 3DS shut down on March 27, 2023.

Title	Year	Genre	Developer	Publisher	Available	Use	Required?	Ref.
Coaster Creator 3D	^{NA}2013^{EU}2014	Simulation game	Gamers Digital		^{AUS, EU, JP, NA}	Riders	No	Nintendo Life
Fun! Fun! Minigolf TOUCH!	2012	Sports	Shin'en Multimedia		^{AUS, EU, NA}	Playable character, save icon	No	Nintendo website
Nintendo Badge Arcade	^{JP}2014^{WW}2015	Arcade	Nintendo		^{AUS, EU, JP, NA}	Background characters, Miiverse players	No	
Rusty's Real Deal Baseball	^{JP}2013^{NA, KO}2014	Sports	Nintendo		^{JP, KO, NA}	Playable character, player avatar	Yes	Nintendo Direct February 2014
Soccer Up 3D (NA); Football Up 3D (PAL)	^{WW}2013^{JP}2014	Sports	EnjoyUP Games		^{EU, JP, NA}	Players, team editor	No	

== Wii U ==
=== Retail games ===
There are 18 games included in the list.

Title	Year	Genre	Developer	Publisher	Available	Use	Required?	Ref.
F1 Race Stars: Powered Up Edition	2014	Racing	Codemasters		^{JP}	Playable character	No	Nintendo Life
Mario Kart 8	2014	Racing	Nintendo EAD, Bandai Namco Games	Nintendo	^{AUS, EU, JP, NA}	Playable character	No	Nintendo Direct: Mario Kart 8
Mario & Sonic at the Sochi 2014 Olympic Winter Games	2013	Sports	Sega Sports R&D	Nintendo	^{AUS, EU, JP, NA}	Playable character	No	
Mario & Sonic at the Rio 2016 Olympic Games	2016	Sports	Sega Sports R&D	Nintendo	^{AUS, EU, JP, NA}	Playable character	No	
New Super Luigi U	2013	Platformer	Nintendo EAD	Nintendo	^{AUS, EU, JP, NA}	Playable character	No	
New Super Mario Bros. U	2012	Platformer	Nintendo EAD	Nintendo	^{AUS, EU, JP, NA}	Playable character, Background characters	No	E3 2012
Nintendo Land	2012	Minigames	Nintendo EAD	Nintendo	^{AUS, EU, JP, NA}	Playable character, Background characters	Yes	E3 2012
Sonic & All-Stars Racing Transformed	^{WW}2012^{JP}2014	Racing	Sumo Digital	Sega	^{AUS, EU, JP, NA}	Playable character	No	
Sonic Lost World	2013	Action-adventure, platformer	Sonic Team	JP/NA: Sega; EU/AUS: Nintendo	^{AUS, EU, JP, NA}	Miiverse integration, character Icon in multiplayer	No	
Star Fox Guard	2016	Tower defense	Nintendo EPD, PlatinumGames	Nintendo	^{AUS, EU, JP, NA}	Save Icon	Yes	Nintendo Direct
Super Mario 3D World	2013	Platformer	Nintendo EAD Tokyo	Nintendo	^{AUS, EU, JP, NA}	Ghost character	No	Nintendo Direct
Super Smash Bros. for Wii U	2014	Fighting	Sora Ltd.	Nintendo	^{AUS, EU, JP, NA}	Playable character, background characters	No	E3 2014
Taiko no Tatsujin: Wii U Version	2013	Rhythm	Bandai Namco Games	Bandai Namco Games	^{JP}	Player icon, dancing characters	No	
Taiko no Tatsujin: Tokumori!	2014	Rhythm	Bandai Namco Games	Bandai Namco Games	^{JP}	Player icon, dancing characters	No	
Taiko no Tatsujin: Atsumete ☆ Tomodachi Daisakusen!	2015	Rhythm	Bandai Namco Games	Bandai Namco Games	^{JP}	Player icon, dancing characters	No	
Wii Fit U	2013	Fitness	Nintendo EAD	Nintendo	^{AUS, EU, JP, NA}	Playable character, background characters, save icon	Yes	Nintendo Direct
Wii Party U	2013	Party	Nintendo Cube	Nintendo	^{AUS, EU, JP, NA}	Playable character, background characters	Yes	Nintendo Direct
Wii Sports Club	2013	Sports	Nintendo EAD	Nintendo	^{AUS, EU, JP, NA}	Playable character, background characters	Yes	Nintendo Direct

=== Nintendo eShop exclusive titles ===
There are four games included in the list. These games are no longer possible to obtain after the Nintendo eShop for Wii U shut down on March 27, 2023.

Title	Year	Genre	Developer	Publisher	Available	Use	Required?	Ref.
A World of Keflings	2014	City-building game	NinjaBee		^{EU, NA}	Playable character	Yes	
Act It Out! A Game Of Charades	2016	Party game	Snap Finger Click		^{EU, NA}	Player icon	No	
F1 Race Stars: Powered Up Edition	2014	Racing	Codemasters		^{EU, NA}	Playable character	No	Nintendo Life
Word Party	2015	Party game	Lightwood Games		^{AUS, EU, NA}	Player icon	Yes	

=== Non-game applications ===
There are four apps included in the list. Only Daily Log remains active as Miiverse shut down on November 8, 2017, while Friends List and Internet Browser both shut down on April 8, 2024 after the discontinuation of Nintendo Network.

Title	Year	Genre	Developer	Publisher	Available	Use	Required?	Ref.
Daily Log	2012	List	Nintendo	Nintendo	^{AUS, EU, JP, KO, NA}	Profile picture	Yes	
Friends List	2012	List	Nintendo	Nintendo	^{AUS, EU, JP, KO, NA}	Profile picture	Yes	
Internet Browser	2012	Web browser	Nintendo SDD	Nintendo	^{AUS, EU, JP, KO, NA}	Cameo	No	
Miiverse	2012	Social media	Nintendo SDD	Nintendo	^{AUS, EU, JP, KO, NA}	Profile picture	Yes	

== Mobile ==
There are six games included in the list. Three apps are no longer possible to obtain after their respective shutdowns: Miitomo on May 9, 2018, Pokémon Rumble Rush on July 22, 2020, and Dr. Mario World on November 1, 2021.

Title	Year	Genre	Developer	Publisher	Available	Use	Required?	Ref.
Dr. Mario World	2019	Match-three tile-matching	Nintendo EPD; Line Corporation; NHN Entertainment	Nintendo	^{AUS, EU, JP, KO, NA}	Profile picture	No	
Mario Kart Tour (Note: Mii support has been added to this game as of version 2.12.0, released in March 2022.)	2019	Racing game	DeNA	Nintendo	^{AUS, EU, JP, KO, NA}	Player character	No	
Miitomo	2016	Social network	Nintendo EPD	Nintendo	^{AUS, EU, JP, KO, NA}	Avatar	Yes	
Pikmin Bloom	2021	Fitness	Nintendo EPD; Niantic	Niantic	^{AUS, EU, JP, KO, NA}	Avatar	Yes	
Pokémon Rumble Rush	2019	Action game	Ambrella	The Pokémon Company	^{AUS, EU, JP, KO, NA}	Avatar	Yes	
Super Mario Run	^{WW}2016^{KO}2017	Auto-runner	Nintendo EPD	Nintendo	^{AUS, EU, JP, KO, NA, PAK}	Avatar	No	

== Nintendo Switch ==
There are 13 games included in the list.

Title	Year	Genre	Developer	Publisher	Available	Use	Required?	Ref.
Active Life: Outdoor Challenge (NA); Family Trainer (PAL)	^{JP}2020^{WW}2021	Sports/fitness	h.a.n.d.	Bandai Namco Entertainment	^{AUS, EU, JP, NA}	Playable character	No	
Disney Magical World 2: Enchanted Edition	2021	Life simulation	h.a.n.d. Bandai Namco Studios	Bandai Namco Entertainment	^{AUS, EU, JP, NA}	Playable character	No	
Go Vacation	2018	Variety	Bandai Namco Studios	Bandai Namco Entertainment	^{AUS, EU, JP, NA}	Playable character	No	
Mario Golf: Super Rush	2021	Sports	Camelot Software Planning	Nintendo	^{AUS, EU, JP, NA}	Playable character	No	February 2021; Nintendo Direct
Mario Kart 8 Deluxe	^{WW}2017^{CHN}2020	Racing	Nintendo EPD	Nintendo	^{AUS, EU, JP, NA}	Playable character	No	
Miitopia	2021	Role-playing	Nintendo EPD	Nintendo	^{AUS, EU, JP, NA}	Playable character	Yes	February 2021; Nintendo Direct
New Super Mario Bros. U Deluxe	2019	Platformer	Nintendo EPD	Nintendo	^{AUS, EU, JP, NA}	Playable character	No	
Nintendo Switch Sports	2022	Sports	Nintendo EPD	Nintendo	^{AUS, EU, JP, NA}	Playable character	No	February 2022; Nintendo Direct
Super Mario Maker 2	2019	Platformer, game creation	Nintendo EPD	Nintendo	^{AUS, EU, JP, NA}	Online profile avatar	Yes	
Super Smash Bros. Ultimate	2018	Fighting	Sora Ltd. Bandai Namco Games	Nintendo	^{AUS, EU, JP, NA}	Playable character, background characters	No	Nintendo Direct; E3 2018
Karaoke Joysound	2017	Music	Xing	Nintendo	^{JP}	Playable character, background characters	No	
Gotouchi Tetsudou for Nintendo Switch !!	2018	Party	B.B.STUDIO CO., LTD. Design Act; Grounding Inc.	Bandai Namco Entertainment	^{JP}	Playable character	Yes	
Tomodachi Life: Living the Dream	2026	Social simulation	Nintendo EPD	Nintendo	^{AUS, EU, JP, NA}	Islanders	Yes	March 2025 Nintendo Direct

== Nintendo Switch 2 ==
There is only 1 game included in the list.

Title	Year	Genre	Developer	Publisher	Available	Use	Required?	Ref.
Nintendo Switch Sports Resort	2026	Sports	Nintendo		^{AUS, EU, JP, NA}	Playable character	No	June 2026; Nintendo Direct
