= We Cheer =

2008 video game

- Developer: Machatin
- Publishers: Namco Bandai Games; 505 Games (PAL)
- Platform: Wii
- Release: NA: September 30, 2008; EU: February 6, 2009; JP: March 12, 2009; AU: June 11, 2009
- Genre: Dance game
- Modes: Single-player, Multiplayer

We Cheer is a dance video game published by Namco Bandai Games.

== Overview ==
The game sees the player leading a squad of cheerleaders through a routine by following lines and swirls that appear on screen by motioning the Wii Remote. For single player and two player games, two Remotes for each player (one per hand) are required, but in four player games each player can use a single Remote only. The game has the player performing physical motions ranging from single motion thrusts, to elaborate zig-zagging actions and windmilling whole arm motions.

We Cheer also allows players to customize their cheer squad including their hair color and uniforms (though only female cheerleaders will be available), and additional outfits and squad members can be unlocked by collecting gold pompoms earned after a successful routine. The game also features a workout mode that keeps track of the number of calories burned by the player during play.

== Soundtrack ==
The game features 30 licensed music tracks, including "The Great Escape" by Boys Like Girls, "That's the Way (I Like It)" by KC & the Sunshine Band, and "Calabria 2007" by Enur & Natasja.

== Reception ==
Reception

Aggregate score
Aggregator	Score
Metacritic	56/100

Review scores
Publication	Score
1Up.com	F
GamePro	2/5
GamesMaster	55%
GameZone	7.2/10
NGamer	68%
Nintendo Power	6/10
Nintendo World Report	8/10
Official Nintendo Magazine	28%

The game received "mixed" reviews according to the review aggregation website Metacritic.

== See also ==
- All Star Cheer Squad
- Elite Beat Agents
- Helix
- We Ski
- We Ski & Snowboard
- We Cheer 2
