= Jillian Michaels' Fitness Ultimatum 2009 =

- North American Wii cover art
- Developer: 3G Studios
- Publishers: NA: Majesco; PAL: Deep Silver
- Platform: Wii
- Release: NA: October 21, 2008; EU: May 29, 2009
- Genres: Fitness, Party
- Modes: Single-player, Multiplayer

Jillian Michaels' Fitness Ultimatum 2009 is a 2008 fitness video game developed by 3G Studios and published by Majesco in North America and by Deep Silver in PAL regions for the Wii. The game features American fitness trainer Jillian Michaels as she guides the player through a fitness camp with various exercises. The player makes use of the Wii Balance Board to participate in 11 different mini games.

The game received mostly negative reviews, with critics noting its poor controls, bad graphics, and repetitive commentary, though there was praise for the game's music and nutrition advice. The game sold over 600,000 copies within the game's first year. The game was followed up by two titles, Jillian Michaels' Fitness Ultimatum 2010 for the Wii and Jillian Michaels' Pocket Trainer 2010 for the Nintendo DS.

== Gameplay ==
The game features Jillian Michaels guiding the player-created character through a fitness boot camp. There, the player can go through 11 different training exercises based around four different work out types, weight loss, strength training, interval training, and hill climbing. Exercises include boxing, pumping handcars, dodging punching bags, and rowing. These exercises can be scaled across multiple intensities (easy, medium, or hard) and lengths.

Completing some exercises will offer exercise tips and videos from Jillian Michaels. Players can track their fitness progress, including weight loss and amount of calories burned, using the Wii Balance Board. The game also has multiplayer minigames that have players compete in exercise challenges.

== Development and Release ==
The game was announced on June 11, 2008. When asked about the game, Michael Pachter from Wedbush Morgan said that "Not all consumers might be aware of what Wii Fit is, but most weight conscious women know Jillian Michaels as a brand." and that the game could convince more people to view the Wii Balance Board as less of a game accessory and more of health product. Michaels said that she hoped the game would help combat childhood obesity. Jesse Sutton, then CEO of Majesco, stated that they were targeting the casual audience, particularly women.

Majesco launched the game in the United States on October 21, 2008. The game launched with a suggested retail price of $39.99 ($60 in 2026). In January and February 2009, GameStop had a promotion where if one would spend over $34.99 ($53 in 2026) on various fitness games, including Jillian Michaels' Fitness Ultimatum 2009, they would get a free subscription to one of various magazines targeted towards women, such as Cosmopolitan and Marie Claire.

== Reception ==
Reception

Aggregate score
Aggregator	Score
Metacritic	30/100

Review scores
Publication	Score
Official Nintendo Magazine	16%
Nintendojo	5/10

Jillian Michaels' Fitness Ultimatum 2009 has received "Generally unfavorable" reviews from critics, holding an aggregate critic score of 30 from Metacritic out of four critic reviews.

Official Nintendo Magazine gave the game a 16% rating, noting that the game's controls were "completely broken". They also stated that Jillian's advice had little impact on gameplay and that they played the game while barely moving and still got a positive reaction from the game. Nintendojo, meanwhile, criticized the graphics, stated that "It looks like much of the development budget was spent getting Jillian onboard." They also called the controls "generic at best", negatively comparing the Wii Balance Board controls specifically to Wii Fit. They did, however, praise the game's soundtrack for its decent variety. Dutch outlet XGN also criticized the game, calling the experience "painfully bad". They particularly criticized the poor controls, the low quality graphics, the limited variations in workouts, and the repetitive audio commentary from Jillian Michaels. They did appreciate the variation of music.

PC World compared this game to three other fitness video games (Wii Fit, Gold's Gym: Cardio Workout, and EA Sports Active: Personal Trainer), consulting on a fitness trainer Joel Hornsby. Jillian Michaels’ Fitness Ultimatum 2009 was rated the worst of these four games. The game, while praised for its inclusive dieting tips, was criticized for its inaccurate motion controls and bad animations. Game Informer had personal trainer Keith Nelson review a selection of five fitness games for the Wii, with Nelson giving Jillian Michaels' Fitness Ultimatum 2009 a 1/5 rating. Nelson criticized the controls, stating that several of the exercises did not work. Nelson specifically mentioned that the handcar exercise almost threw out his back. Nelson also called the running sections boring. However, the nutrition tips were praised.

=== Sales ===
By March 11, 2009, the game had sold over 500,000 copies and was considered a top seller by NPD Group. By June 16 of the same year, that number had increased to 600,000 copies and the game was partially attributed, alongside the Cooking Mama franchise to helping Majesco's revue increase by 60%. These games have been credited for helping Majesco during the Great Recession.

== Legacy ==
In 2009, the game received two sequels, Jillian Michaels' Fitness Ultimatum 2010 for the Wii and Jillian Michaels' Pocket Trainer 2010 for the Nintendo DS. In 2011, Jillian Michaels' Fitness Adventure was released for the Xbox 360, utilizing the Kinect accessory.
