= Snowboard Riot =

2009 video game

- Developer: Hudson Soft
- Publisher: Hudson Soft
- Platform: Wii (WiiWare)
- Release: NA: February 2, 2009; JP: February 10, 2009; PAL: February 27, 2009
- Genre: Snowboarding
- Modes: Single-player, Multiplayer

Snowboard Riot, known in Japan as Board Warriors (ボードウォリアーズ, Bōdo Woriāzu), is a snowboarding video game for WiiWare by Hudson Soft released in North America on February 2, 2009, and in the PAL regions on February 27, 2009. The game supports the Wii Balance Board and features online multiplayer via the Nintendo Wi-Fi Connection.

== Gameplay ==
In the game, players race against each other across four courses. Along the way, they can pick up weapons and power-ups such as mines, homing missiles, turbo boosts, invisibility and shields in order to hinder their opponents and aid themselves. Players can also use their board to protect themselves from attack. Each course features several alternate routes and hazards such as cliffs, but are linear and require the player to enter a teleportation portal at the bottom to warp them to the top of the course to start the next lap.

Players will be able to choose from four characters, and be able to customize and upgrade their gear, giving them performance boosts. The game also features a time attack mode, two player split screen offline multiplayer and online multiplayer against up to four opponents, and an option to race without weapons or power-ups.

== Reception ==
Reception

Aggregate score
Aggregator	Score
Metacritic	49/100

Review scores
Publication	Score
Gamekult	5/10
IGN	5.5/10
Jeuxvideo.com	9/20
NGamer	40%
Nintendo Life	5/10
Teletext GameCentral	5/10

The game received "generally unfavorable reviews" according to the review aggregation website Metacritic. IGN criticized the game's "overly aggressive" rubberband AI and an unrewarding single player experience. Nintendo Life found that the reliance on using weapons to win rather than pure racing skill can result in a frustrating experience for the player.
