= Fizzball =

2006 video game

- Developers: Grubby Games (Windows); Steel Penny Games (Wii)
- Publisher: Grubby Games
- Platforms: Windows, OS X, Linux, Wii
- Release: November 2006: Windows; October 21, 2009: Wii
- Genre: Breakout
- Mode: Single-player

Fizzball is a Breakout-style video game by American studio Grubby Games. It was released for Microsoft Windows in 2006, then OS X and Linux. A Wii version was published in 2009 under the name Doctor Fizzwizzle's Animal Rescue. Fizzball was a finalist for an award at the 2007 Independent Games Festival.

== Plot and gameplay ==
The "fizzball" grows as more objects and animals are drawn into it. Here, the ball contains a cow.

All of the island's animals have been acting strange lately. Professor Fizzwizzle takes on the task of capturing them all in his newly invented magic bubble. The animals are then kept in a nursery and fed using the coins he has collected throughout the island's levels.

Players obtain coins by completing a series of levels in which the bubble is bounced upward, toward a playfield filled with animals. Different stages feature breakable objects such as fences which must be destroyed to reach some animals. The animals come in a variety of sizes, some of which cannot be collected with the bubble at its initial size; the bubble starts out small, allowing only the smallest animals to be collected, but as more are captured, the bubble increases in size, making larger animals available. Along with the animals, stages are populated with hazards such as barrels of toxic waste. For avoiding these hazards, players are awarded bonus points.

In the PC version, the paddle (a rocket) is controlled using a mouse. The Wii port instead supports the Wii Remote's pointer and tilt functions, the Nunchuk, the Classic Controller and the Wii Balance Board.

== Reception ==
The game had a generally positive reception. In their 9.0/10 review, Inside Mac Games called the graphics "absolutely amazing for a game that runs [so] fast", said "the music is pretty smooth and works well" and overall the game was "well worth it!" Jay is Games said "the simple, light-hearted gameplay won me over immediately" and that it was "a joy to play". However, some criticism was directed at the game's low level of difficulty. Jay is Games lamented that "the one problem I had with it, and it's a big one, is that [it] takes a long time to ramp up in difficulty."
