= Wii Music =

2008 video game

- North American version cover art
- Developer: Nintendo EAD
- Publisher: Nintendo
- Director: Kazumi Totaka
- Producers: Takashi Tezuka; Katsuya Eguchi
- Programmer: Yusuke Shibata
- Artist: Koji Takahashi
- Composers: Kenta Nagata; Toru Minegishi; Mahito Yokota
- Series: Wii
- Platform: Wii
- Release: JP: October 16, 2008; NA: October 20, 2008; AU: November 13, 2008; EU: November 14, 2008
- Genre: Music
- Modes: Single-player, multiplayer

Wii Music (Note: Wiiミュージック (Wii Myūjikku, In Japanese)) is a 2008 music video game developed and published by Nintendo for the Wii. The game was released in Japan and North America in October 2008, and in Europe and Australia in the following month. Wii Music is part of both Nintendo's Touch! Generations brand and the Wii series.

Wii Music focuses on creating arrangements of existing songs by controlling the members of an on-screen band. In order to do so, players choose from a selection of musical instruments that are played by mimicking the required actions using the Wii Remote and Nunchuk. Unlike other music games, such as Guitar Hero and Rock Band, players are not scored on their performance and are encouraged to experiment with different ways to play various songs. The game has been advertised by Nintendo as a means to "bring the joy and creativity of musicianship to [one's] home without expensive music lessons."

Wii Music is one of the original titles announced for the Wii console, first publicly playable at E3 2006, and then later re-introduced in greater detail at E3 2008. Upon release, Wii Music received mixed reviews according to aggregate scores with common criticism directed at its simple gameplay, imprecise motion controls and its predominantly public-domain soundtrack. As such, it is regarded as the black sheep of the Wii series and is also one of the least commercially successful entries, selling 2.65 million copies worldwide as of March 2009.

== Gameplay ==
Wii Music gameplay focuses on playing and arranging songs through improvisation using various instruments. Similar to how Wii Sports simulates playing sports by mimicking the required gestures using the motion sensitive Wii Remote, Wii Music simulates playing music by mimicking the actions associated with the different instruments. Like all games in the Wii series, the players control Mii characters created using the console's Mii Channel.

=== Instruments ===
The game offers a selection of sixty-six playable instruments, including the violin, drum, cowbell, flute, clarinet, saxophone, harmonica, piano, guitar, trumpet, harp, shamisen, maracas, sitar and marimba, as well as unconventional instruments such as dog and cat sounds, pseudo doo-wop vocals (singer), karate shouts (blackbelt), cheerleader cheers, and 8-bit sounds.

To play each of the instruments, the player mimics the required motions with the Wii Remote and the Nunchuk. Because of the varying techniques required to play different instruments, the instruments in Wii Music are divided into "groups" to which certain movements or button presses play single notes. For example, instruments such as keyboards and percussion require the player to swing the controllers as if striking drums; and some string instruments such as the violin and the guitar are played by moving the Wii Remote as if drawing a bow or strumming the strings, while the Nunchuk is held as if gripping the instrument's neck and fingerboard. The Wii Balance Board can also be utilized in playing the various drum kits, emulating the foot-operated pedals. All instruments have extra playing options, where additional button-presses or restricted movements have different effects on the sound. Softer notes can be played with slower Wii Remote movement, and holding various buttons can create damping, muting, chords, tremolo, arpeggio, and glissando.

=== Jam Mode ===
Screenshot of four players playing different parts of "Happy Birthday to You" using piano, acoustic guitar, cowbell, and dog suit. Unlike Guitar Hero, playing to the on-screen guide (not shown) is optional. Wii Music allows players to either stick close to the original melody or improvise new arrangements, using any selection of instruments.

The game's main feature, Jam Mode, features 50 songs that consist of a combination of classical and traditional songs, seven Nintendo songs, and 15 licensed songs. Before playing the selected song, the players each choose any of the available instruments and then perform as one of six different members of a band; the six available sections are melody, harmony, chord, bass, and two percussion parts. Unoccupied sections are played by computer-controlled "Tute" characters or can be dropped altogether.

Unlike other music games such as Rock Band or Guitar Hero where players are scored based on playing certain notes at specific times, Jam Mode lacks a scoring system and does not objectively penalize for missing or playing "incorrect" notes nor do players have any control over the pitch of the notes played. Instead, the internal music track for each section of all songs is specially programmed to respond to all possible player actions: the game will attempt to make any notes played be harmonious to the song, including those played outside the original melody. Consequently, players are encouraged to practice and experiment with different ways to play songs using any arrangement of instruments, either choosing to stick close to the guide or diverge from it and create unique compositions. The quality of the new arrangement is up to the player's judgement. Players can also do what is called an "Overdub" session in which the same song is played again controlling a different musician or instrument; this allows the players to play over the music recorded in previous playthroughs and allows a single player to play all parts of a band. Players can then save their overall performance as a music video for later playback, or share it with other players via WiiConnect24.

Wii Music also supplies templates of each song according to existing music genres, such as pop, march, rock, and jazz, and players can take interactive tutorials to learn how to fit a song to a particular style.

=== Minigames ===
Along with the freeform Jam Mode, Wii Music features four minigames that feature a scoring system:

- Mii Maestro, where players use the Wii Remote as a baton to conduct an orchestra, swinging the controller up and down to a certain tempo. Different movements affect the performance of the orchestra. There are no indicators of any kind to show how well the player is performing, forcing the player to try to match the original music from memory, and experiment to find which movements will yield a higher score. Multiplayer is cooperative; several players conduct the same orchestra at once, and are scored based how harmoniously they perform.
- Handbell Harmony, considered similar in style to Guitar Hero, where players match notes to the on-screen guide by playing two handbells, each controlled by shaking the Wii Remote and the Nunchuk. Players are scored depending on how many notes are played correctly.
- Pitch Perfect, which quizzes players on distinguishing different sounds from one another. The sub games inside the "Pitch Perfect" game include identifying high and low pitches, major and minor pitches and piecing together a song from scrambled notes.
- Drums, that allows players to play drums or to follow drum lessons.

== Development ==
Wii Music was first shown, along with the Wii Remote, at the Nintendo press conference at the 2005 Tokyo Game Show. The two minigames briefly featured were Drums and Orchestra. The game was also the first Wii game ever to be demonstrated during Nintendo's E3 2006 press conference, where Shigeru Miyamoto came up to the stage to perform The Legend of Zelda Overworld Theme for the audience using the Orchestra game. Both Drums and Orchestra were also made playable to attendees. Additional details of the game were released in conjunction with a Nintendo press conference held on October 11, 2007.

Wii Music was showcased during Nintendo's press conference for E3 2008, revealing much more information, including support for the Wii Balance Board to play the drums. It was revealed later on that the game has lessons for the drums programmed in. Miyamoto later announced that more than 61 instruments will be playable in the game, and explained the control scheme that uses the Wii Remote's buttons to play notes on various instrument while holding the Wii Remote in a similar fashion to the actual instrument.

According to Shigeru Miyamoto, one of the game's producers, the idea for Wii Music came to be after conceptualizing different core parts of family activity, such as sports and fitness, to allow for easy connectivity to the Wii from a broad audience. After experimenting with the Wii remote and nunchuck to conduct an orchestra, they found the gameplay to be really enjoyable.

The first prototype of the game was simply performing with instruments, but Miyamoto found the concept to be similar to the likes of other rhythm games at the time; he urged the developers to make differentiating ideas from the general format of these games, as he thought the games were simply about rhythm matching and not about creating music. He wanted to focus the game on creative freedom, allowing the player to play the game how they want.

== Reception ==
=== Critical ===
Reception

Aggregate scores
Aggregator	Score
GameRankings	64.34%
Metacritic	63/100

Review scores
Publication	Score
1Up.com	A−
Game Informer	3/10
GamePro	3.5/5 stars
GameSpot	6.5/10
GameSpy	3.5/5 stars
GameTrailers	5.8/10
IGN	5/10
Nintendo Life	8/10 stars
Nintendo World Report	7/10
Official Nintendo Magazine	80%
X-Play	3/5 stars
Wired	7/10

Critical reception of the game was mixed, with a 63% aggregate score at Metacritic. Wii Music was given a score of A− by 1UP.com's Jennifer Tsao, who believed the game has a "surprising depth and flexibility" that rewards players who have mastered the controls. She also felt that the game's four-player custom jam mode was addictive, but lamented the abundance of public domain songs in the soundtrack. This review greatly contrasted the reviews of other editors on 1UP, who complained about a lack of depth and content. It was given 80% by Official Nintendo Magazine who praised the surprising depth of the game. GameSpy, who gave it 3.5/5, called the game an "odd duck" and something "more akin to a tech demo or social audio experiment" with little to interest adults, but is simple enough to be accessible to everyone and believed it would be a hit with young children and their families. Wii Music also got a 6.5/10 from GameSpot, who said that Wii Music, while fun and easy to pick up and play, is hard to recommend because older children and adults would only get a few hours of entertainment.

The game received a 5/10 from IGN, who called the game "a noise maker tied to a series of gestures" and cited "gimmicky" controls and poor sound quality, in addition to a "fundamentally flawed" soundtrack. However, they also felt that children may enjoy the game much more than adults, who they believe may "grow bored of the experience in a matter of hours, if not minutes". Game Informer gave the game a 3/10, calling it "a poor solution to an imaginary problem". GameTrailers gave it 5.8/10, criticizing the "ancient" song list and emphasis on video creation.

=== Sales ===
The game sold 92,000 copies in its first week of release in Japan. It was the 30th best-selling game of Japan in 2008. In North America, the game sold around 66,000 copies in around the same period after release. It received a "Gold" sales award from the Entertainment and Leisure Software Publishers Association (ELSPA), indicating sales of at least 200,000 copies in the United Kingdom.

Shigeru Miyamoto has stated that the game's sales had not been as strong as originally hoped, with a possible reason for this being competition from established music and rhythm games series such as Guitar Hero and Rock Band which are dominating the market. Cammie Dunaway, Nintendo of America's executive vice president of sales and marketing, suggests Wii Music will be an "evergreen" title that will see continued sales in the long run. Wii Music was the tenth best selling game in the US for the month of November 2008 and the 11th best-selling game in the following month in the United States with more than 480,000 copies sold, and has sold 865,000 units in North America in 2008 according to the NPD Group. As of March 2009, Wii Music has sold 2.65 million copies worldwide.

In an interview in 2009, Shigeru Miyamoto stated that "Wii Music was a really unique game, and even today, we are receiving several different offers from people in the field of music education. I think it still has great potential." However, when asked about future plans, Miyamoto only gave hints of future plans. "Unfortunately, we don't have any news we can talk about at the moment. But like Wii Fit Plus, it's not really a sequel to the original Wii Fit – but we have added some features to improve the overall experience. It's kind of an enhanced version."
