= We Cheer 2 =

2009 video game

- Developer: Machatin
- Publisher: Namco Bandai Games
- Composer: Masayoshi Ishi
- Platform: Wii
- Release: NA: November 3, 2009; JP: July 15, 2010
- Genre: Dance game
- Modes: Single-player, Multiplayer

We Cheer 2, known in Japan as We Cheer: Dancing Spirits! (ウィーチア ダンシングスピリッツ！), is a dance video game releases by Namco Bandai Games. It is the sequel to We Cheer.

== Gameplay ==
The gameplay is the same as the original We Cheer using the Wii Remote as a virtual pom-poms. In the single player mode, players can use either two Wii Remotes (one in each hand) or one Wii Remote (in either the left or right hand) to follow the on-screen motions. The game also offers cooperative and competitive modes for up to 4 players. New to the game are further customization of characters and the ability to play as a male or female cheerleader.

== Development ==
The game features 30 licensed music tracks.

== Reception ==
Reception

Aggregate score
Aggregator	Score
Metacritic	64/100

Review scores
Publication	Score
Famitsu	30/40
GamePro	2.5/5
GameRevolution	C−
IGN	6.5/10
Nintendo World Report	8.5/10

The game received "mixed" reviews according to the review aggregation website Metacritic. In Japan, Famitsu gave it a score of one eight, two sevens, and one eight for a total of 30 out of 40.

== See also ==
- All Star Cheer Squad
- All Star Cheer Squad 2
- We Cheer
