= We Ski & Snowboard =

2008 skiing video game

- Developer: Namco Bandai Games
- Publisher: Namco Bandai Games (Note: Released under the Namco brand name in Japan, Europe, and Australia)
- Composers: Hiroshi Okubo; Rio Hamamoto; Tetsuya Uchida
- Series: We Ski
- Platform: Wii
- Release: JP: November 13, 2008; EU: February 27, 2009; NA: March 3, 2009; AU: March 20, 2009
- Genre: Sports
- Modes: Single-player, multiplayer

We Ski & Snowboard, known as Family Ski: World Ski and Snowboard in Japan and Family Ski & Snowboard in Europe and Australia, is a video game for the Wii. It is a sequel to the 2008 title We Ski and utilizes the Wii Balance Board.

== Gameplay ==
When skiing, players stand on the Balance Board, and by distributing their weight and using the Wii Remote and Nunchuk as virtual ski poles, simulate the sport of skiing as accurately as possible. When snowboarding, players stand on the Balance Board rotated 90° and use the Wii Remote and Nunchuk to propel themselves forward. Players have the ability to swap between skiing and snowboarding at any time during gameplay. The game can also be played without the Balance Board.

The game world features 7,000 vertical meters of skiing or snowboarding. Besides racing, the game also features different modes such as a School, Slalom Challenge, and Half-pipe in addition to an Enjoy the Resort mode in which up to 4 players may ski or snowboard wherever they want on the slopes. Another thing to do is collect thumbs ups by finding or completing various things.

Players can use their pre-existing Miis or can instead select a customizable character created in-game as avatars (all returning from We Ski), and players can earn unlockables such as character apparel and upgraded equipment by completing various goals, such as finding hidden courses, etc. Also returning from We Ski is the ability to share photos taken by players in-game via the WiiConnect24 service, until the service was discontinued by Nintendo in 2013.

The game features two courses, Jamboree Snow Resort and Mt. Angrio, each have runs for all skill levels and challenges.

== Release ==
The game was announced by Namco Bandai Games in October 2008 for a March 2009 release. The game was distributed in Europe and Australia by Atari, unlike the first entry which was handled by Nintendo.

== Reception ==
Reception

Aggregate score
| Aggregator | Score |
|---|---|
| Metacritic | 66/100 |

Review scores
| Publication | Score |
|---|---|
| Eurogamer | 7/10 |
| Famitsu | 34/40 |
| Game Informer | 6.75/10 |
| GameSpot | 7/10 |
| GameTrailers | 7/10 |
| GameZone | 6.1/10 |
| IGN | 5.4/10 |
| Nintendo Life | 6/10 |
| Nintendo Power | 6.5/10 |
| Nintendo World Report | 6/10 |

The game received "average" reviews according to the review aggregation website Metacritic. In Japan, Famitsu gave it a score of two nines and two eights for a total of 34 out of 40.

Namco Bandai reported that the game sold a combined 270,000 copies in North America and Europe as of June 30, 2009.

The game was later released under Nintendo’s "Everyone’s Recommendation Selection" of budget titles in Japan.

== See also ==
- We Ski
- We Cheer
- We Cheer 2
- Go Vacation
