= Equilibrio =

2009 video game

- Developers: DK Games; Fishing Cactus (iOS)
- Publisher: DK Games
- Designer: Christophe Kohler
- Platforms: Wii (WiiWare), iOS, AmigaOS4
- Release: WiiWare: NA: April 6, 2009; PAL: April 10, 2009; JP: April 27, 2010; iOS; April 2009
- Genre: Puzzle
- Modes: Single-player, multiplayer

Equilibrio (known as Katamuki Spirits in Japan) is a video game, published and developed by DK Games for WiiWare. The WiiWare version was released in North America on April 6, 2009, in the PAL regions on April 10, 2009 and in Japan on April 27, 2010. An iOS version was also released in April 2009 and was ported by Fishing Cactus.

Equilibrio was inspired by and incorporated code from a similar shareware game named Fragile Ball.

== Gameplay ==
The game involves players tilting their Wii Remote (or iOS device), or leaning on their Wii Balance Board from side to side in order to guide a ball through a horizontal maze and into an exit pod. Instead of directly controlling the ball, the player's actions rotate the entire play area around the ball.

The game features 5 different types of balls to guide, each with unique properties that alter the way they handle, and over 60 levels with difficulty gradually adjusted based on the player's skill level. The WiiWare version also features 4 player simultaneous multiplayer.
