= Go Vacation =

2011 video game

- Developer: Namco Bandai Games (Note: Nintendo Switch version developed by Bandai Namco Studios)
- Publishers: Namco Bandai Games (Note: Released under the Namco brand name); Nintendo Switch: WW: Nintendo; JP: Bandai Namco Entertainment
- Producer: Kenya Kobayashi
- Composers: Taku Inoue; Norihiko Hibino
- Series: We Ski
- Platforms: Wii, Nintendo Switch
- Release: Wii: NA: 11 October 2011; JP: 20 October 2011; EU: 4 November 2011; AU: 17 November 2011; Nintendo Switch; WW: 27 July 2018: JP: 27 December 2018
- Genres: Party, Sports
- Modes: Single-player, multiplayer

Go Vacation (Note: Japanese: ゴーバケーション, Hepburn: Gō Bakēshon) is a 2011 party video game developed and published by Namco Bandai Games for the Wii. It is a spin-off of the We Ski series. Up to four players can compete against each other in over 50 sport-based minigames that take place in four fictional island resorts. Minigames range from activities such as kayaking and horseback riding, to activities like table hockey and minigolf. Different resorts can be accessed using vehicles such as trolleys and bicycles. Players can customize the outfit of their avatar and decorate their house with furniture.

The game's development began in 2009 and lasted two and a half years. It was announced at the 2011 Electronic Entertainment Expo as an entry in the We Ski series; the game was released later that year for the Wii. The game was ported to the Nintendo Switch in 2018 and included new features such as the ability to take photographs. Surveys were held in the United States, Europe, and Japan to determine which sports and activities should be included in the minigames. Although the resorts were not directly based on real-life locations, producer Kobayashi said Hawaii was a possible influence for the Marine Resort.

Go Vacation had a mixed reception; critics praised its multiplayer aspects and creativity but criticized its soundtrack, environments, controls, and the quality of the minigames. It was the third-best-selling game in Japan the week of its release, selling 47,209 copies. A Nintendo Switch port developed in collaboration with Nintendo was released in 2018.

== Gameplay ==
A split screen view of four players having a water gun fight

Go Vacation is a party and sports video game. Players explore four resorts located on the fictional Kawawii Island: Marine, City, Mountain, and Snow. They start the game in the Marine Resort. More than 50 activities, both competitive and co-operative, are available. These include bungee jumping, ice fishing, scuba diving, miniature golf, tennis, off-road racing, and snowman building. Some minigames require or allow for the use of different controllers and accessories, such as the MotionPlus controller, the Wii Zapper, the Balance Board, or the Wii Wheel. Winning some minigames unlocks more challenging modes. The island open world can be navigated at the player's leisure by walking or riding on vehicles, the type of which depends on the resort, and each resort has certain places where players can fast travel to. In the Switch version, players are able to find and take photographs of animals that are scattered across the resorts, and find boxes with rewards in them.

The Marine Resort, which contains coves, jungles, and beaches, is themed around watersports, including beach volleyball, surfing, water gun battles, and Marine bike races. The City Resort, which centers around extreme and leisure sports and skating, is the second and smallest resort. It hosts games such as table hockey, carnival games, skate tricks, and mini golf. Players can use skateboards and roller skates found throughout the resort to ride on skating rails. The third resort, the Snow Resort, is a huge ski resort that focuses on winter sports like ski jumping, snow tubing, snowboarding, dogsled, and snowball fights. The final resort is the Mountain Resort, where players can partake in many outdoor activities. It includes forests and rivers, which are the locations for activities like rafting, paragliding, off-road car racing, and horseback riding. It also contains a lake with a castle and a shooting park.

Go Vacation can be played using a Mii or one of 284 avatars divided into eight categories such as "Grandmother", "Grandfather", "Boy", and "Girl". Treasure chests containing outfits for the players' avatars are scattered around the resorts. Players can create a virtual dog and a non-player character (NPC) to accompany them as they explore the resorts which, with some exceptions, (Note: For instance, a minigame where the player may take a virtual dog and an NPC they have created is dog sledding). Up to four players can play together through local multiplayer. Occasionally, NPCs may ask players to embark upon a small quest, such as getting an item and taking it back to them.

After playing 20 minigames, players gains access to their own virtual villas, which can be decorated with furniture or photographs taken during the game. Furniture can be found in the game's world or unlocked using "silver keys" that are obtained after completing minigame goals. Furniture is gained in sets, of which there are 90. Players can alter the exterior of their villas using "gold keys", earned by completing challenges.

== Development and release ==
Go Vacation was announced at the 2011 Electronic Entertainment Expo (E3) as the third entry in the We Ski series. Bandai Namco Games began development of the game in 2009, shortly after the release of We Ski & Snowboard because the developers felt they had not given players a "complete sense" of winter in the previous game. When discussing ways to address this, the developers decided winter alone was not enough; they wanted to depict other seasons. Producer Kenya Kobayashi wanted the game to focus on the experience of going on a resort holiday, rather than strictly focusing on the minigames themselves. Part of the game's development was outsourced to other companies; the rest was done by Bandai Namco Games staff who had previously worked on the Ridge Racer series. After realizing the word "vacation" is frequently associated with relaxation, Kenya Kobayashi named the game Go Vacation to clarify that it is a game in which you must be active.

The resorts were not directly based on any real-life locations, although Kobayashi said the Marine Resort "might be inspired by things you find in Hawaii". The developers conducted surveys in the United States, Europe, and Japan to determine what activities to include in the game. The development team included 50 minigames in Go Vacation because most of the game's contemporaries included only 10 to 15 minigames. Developing the controls for the game's vehicles felt like "second nature" to the development team due to their experience on the Ridge Racer series.

Go Vacation was released for the Wii in 2011, the exact date of release vary depending on region. It released on 11 October in North America, 20 October in Japan, 4 November in Europe, and 17 November in Australia. The game was distributed by Nintendo in all PAL region territories.

It was later ported to the Switch. The port released on 27 July 2018 in all regions except for Japan, where it was released on 27 December.

The soundtrack of Go Vacation consists of both original music, as well as instrumental and vocal arrangements of music from past Namco games. Several composers, musicians, and vocal artists worked on the soundtrack for Go Vacation, including Taku Inoue, Norihiko Hibino, Aubrey Ashburn, and Jody Whitesides. Two soundtrack albums released. The first, the officially licensed album Namco Music Saloon, was released on 21 December 2012 by Japanese record label Sweep Records, and includes live instrumentation and vocals. The album consists of original arrangements of songs from other Bandai Namco Entertainment titles, including Ridge Racer, Dig Dug, Pac-Man, New Rally-X, and Kotoba no Puzzle: Mojipittan. The second, GO VACATION BGM Album, was released by Namco Sounds digitally on iTunes on 23 March 2013. This album contains original music composed by Taku Inoue for Go Vacation. Some music also returns from We Ski and, while absent from the Go Vacation soundtrack albums, are present on the "We Ski Original Soundtrack" released in 2023.

== Reception ==
Reception

Aggregate score
Aggregator	Score
Metacritic	(Wii) 64/100 (Nintendo Switch) 62/100

Review scores
Publication	Score
Destructoid	5/10
Famitsu	29/40
GamesMaster	79%
GameSpot	6.5/10
IGN	7/10
Jeuxvideo.com	14/20
NGamer	56%
Nintendo Life	4/10 (Wii), 6/10 (Nintendo Switch)
Nintendo Power	7/10
Nintendo World Report	8/10 (Wii), 7.5/10 (Nintendo Switch)
Official Nintendo Magazine	80%

Go Vacation received a mixed reception from critics; both versions of the game received "mixed or average" reviews according to review aggregator Metacritic. Andy Robertson of Wired stated the game was one of his "go-to family gaming suggestions", calling it "a real treat". James Stephanie Sterling, writing for Destructoid, argued that "to call it bad would be unfair, but to call it anything better would give it more credit than it deserves". The Wii version of Go Vacation was the third-best-selling game in Japan during its first week, selling 47,209 copies, behind both Macross F: The Wings of Goodbye Hybrid Pack and Naruto Shippuden: Ultimate Ninja Impact.

The controls of the Wii version received a mixed reception but those of the Switch were praised. Of the Wii version, IGN's Audrey Drake said, "from Marine bikes to roller blades to horses, traversing the island proves engaging in its own right". Sterling took issue with the need to plug and unplug the Nunchuk controllers on the Wii version when swapping between minigames. Nintendo Power's Cody M. said that while exploring the game's open world can be a "joy", but that the motion controls were "awkward" and could cause players attempting to move forward to accidentally change their direction. Mark Reece of Nintendo Life said the minigames were not fun to play due to "a poorly conceived or unintuitive control scheme". Reviewing the Switch version, Daan Koopman of Nintendo World Report noted that the controls are one of the "biggest improvements over the original". Alessandra Borgonovo of IGN Italia praised the controls for the roller skates, saying that they were fun to use.

On the game's minigames, critics were mostly negative. In her review of the Wii version, Sterling called them "tepid and shallow". Reviewing the Switch version, Koopman criticized the game for not properly informing the player that more activities and modes can be accessed in the individual minigames after the first playthrough of said minigame. Nintendo Life's Ryan Craddock felt that they are "an undercooked version of things we've seen countless times before." Jeuxvideo.com's Anagund praised the amount of minigames available, saying that the proverb of "quality over quantity" might have lost its meaning with Go Vacation. Reviewing the Wii version, Chris Watters, a writer for GameSpot, was mostly positive about the minigames, saying that "most are decent", but that some had succumbed to an "awkward camera" or "unresponsive controls".

According to Reece, the game's music is "irritating and forgettable in equal measure", and the Wii version's opening theme would "more than likely awaken a strong desire to gouge out your own eardrums". In reviewing the game's soundtrack, Don Kotowski said the vocals in some of the music are "cheesy" and tend to "be a huge distraction that really hampers my enjoyment of the album". He praised the songs "Starry Ocean" and "Malasada Break" for their "nice island vibe" and said it was "quite impressive to see how Hibino has elaborated on the simple originals to produce fully-fledged arrangements".

Watters criticized one aspect of villas; he said the game does not properly communicate to players how to gain silver and gold keys, which are used to customize villas. Some reviewers, however, praised the customizable villas; Craddock, in his review of the Switch version, compared them to the house customization mechanics of the Animal Crossing series.

According to Drake, the game's island is "where everyone but yourself is actually a robot", referring to a lack of interaction with NPCs. Sterling criticized the NPCs for their design, calling them "faux anime characters" and "completely charmless". Reece also took issue with the NPCs, writing, "even if you hop onto an ATV and plough into someone at full speed, they'll have very little to say for themselves when they get back on their feet".
