= All Star Cheer Squad =

2008 video game

- Developer: Gorilla Systems
- Publisher: THQ
- Platforms: Wii; Nintendo DS
- Release: October 27, 2008
- Genre: Rhythm game
- Modes: Single-player, Multiplayer

All Star Cheer Squad (released in Europe as All Star Cheerleader) is a rhythm video game developed by Gorilla Systems for the Wii and Nintendo DS. It was released on October 27, 2008.

The game is THQ's "first original property created specifically for girls".

== Overview ==
The game portrays the player as a cheerleader at a week-long cheer camp, who makes friends and enemies, practices fun stunts, competes and challenges other cheerleaders, and eventually becomes captain of the Wolf Squad.

On the Wii, the Wii Remote and Nunchuk, along with the Balance Board can be used to perform cheer and dance moves. Cheerleading choreographer Tony G of Bring It On fame acted as chief consultant to the game.

== Plot ==
The player arrives at Camp spirit as a rookie cheerleader on Wolf squad, a squad that doesn't have high ratings. As soon as they get there, another cheerleader challenges them to a cheer challenge and then they meet up with spiteful cousin, Becka. Becka challenges them to a night time cheer challenge after curfew, but she doesn't show up. They end up getting in trouble for sneaking out after curfew. The next day, they are assigned a punishment and soon begin cheer events and competitions against other squads. Jayden, one of the squad mates, finds out that Becka tricked them and decides to take revenge on Becka's squad, Tiger squad. Jayden finds the Wolf squad spirit stick missing, and assumes that Tiger Squad stole it, so in retaliation to this she sneaks into the Tiger Squad dorm and steals their spirit stick. However, it turns out the captain of their squad, Kieko, just took their stick to a camp council meeting so Jayden asks them to sneak into the Tiger Squad dorm after curfew and return the stick. They successfully return the stick, but Kieko comes back from the meeting and they get into trouble. Jayden blames the whole thing on them, and they are assigned another punishment next day. Jayden feels bad and admits that she stole Tiger Squad's spirit stick. Kieko refuses to lift the player's punishment, and Jayden tells the cheer council about it. The council decides that they showed true spirit by taking the blame for Jayden and Kieko didn't because she didn't lift the punishment. The player is promoted to captain of Wolf Squad in Kieko's place. They are harsh on their squadmates and they start to get upset. That night, they and Jayden here a noise coming from another dorm and Jayden asks them to go and investigate. The player sneaks out and find Becka having to work out all night without food in Tiger Squad's dorm by her captain, Brianna. The player brings Becka cake and she starts being nice. The next day is the last day of cheer camp. Becka nominates the player for camp champ against Tiger Squad leader Brianna. The next day, they challenge her, but she ends up winning, earning herself the title of Camp Champ for the third year in a row. The player competes in a few more events and challenges more cheerleaders to get patches for their journal, and end up winning the last cheer event.

== Sequel ==
All Star Cheer Squad 2
- Developer: Gorilla Systems
- Publisher: THQ
- Platform: Wii
- Release: October 27, 2009
- Genres: Sports, Music
- Mode: Single-player

All Star Cheer Squad 2 (released in Europe as All Star Cheerleader 2) is a rhythm video game developed by Gorilla Systems and published by THQ for Wii. It released on October 27, 2009.

The story revolves around the election of the new Tiger Squad cheer captain, which annoys the ones who were in her position before. Throughout the game, she needs to prove her worth to the team and ultimately prepare them for a battle against the rival squad, Wolf Pack. Cheer moves can be performed by using Wii Remote (one or two) and Nunchuk, while Wii Balance Board is also a part of the controls. It can be used to control the player's foot position. There is a Cheer Line on the bottom of the screen with prompts for performing moves and stunts, but players are able to get full points only if they hit them once they reach the center of the circle, found at the left side of the screen.
