= We Ski =

2008 skiing video game

- Developer: Namco Bandai Games
- Publisher: Namco Bandai Games (Note: Released under the Namco brand name in Japan and Europe)
- Composer: Hiroshi Okubo
- Series: Sports WaiWai
- Platform: Wii
- Release: JP: January 31, 2008; NA: May 13, 2008; EU: June 13, 2008
- Genre: Skiing
- Modes: Single-player, multiplayer

We Ski (Note: Known in Japan and Europe as Family Ski (ファミリースキー, Famirī Sukī)) is a 2008 skiing video game for the Wii developed and published by Namco Bandai Games. It is the first third-party game (and second game behind Wii Fit) released that makes use of the Wii Balance Board.

A sequel, We Ski & Snowboard, which adds snowboarding to the game, was released in 2008. A spin-off, Go Vacation, which featured dozens of sports and several open worlds to explore, was also released for the Wii in 2011.

== Gameplay ==
The player skiing down a slope

We Ski can either be played with or without the Wii Balance Board. If using the board, the player can distribute their weight and use the Wii Remote and Nunchuk as virtual ski poles, simulating the sport of skiing.

The game features 14 courses, which can be skied during both day and night. Besides racing, the game also features different modes such as a Ski School, Centipede Races, and Search and Rescue in addition to a Freestyle mode in which up to 4 players may ski freely.

Players may use their own Miis or one of the customizable in-game avatars. They can earn rewards such as character apparel and upgraded ski equipment by completing various goals. The player can also perform "air tricks" on marked jumps. Additionally, the WiiConnect24 service allowed the sharing of photos taken by players in-game until it was discontinued by Nintendo in 2013.

== Development ==
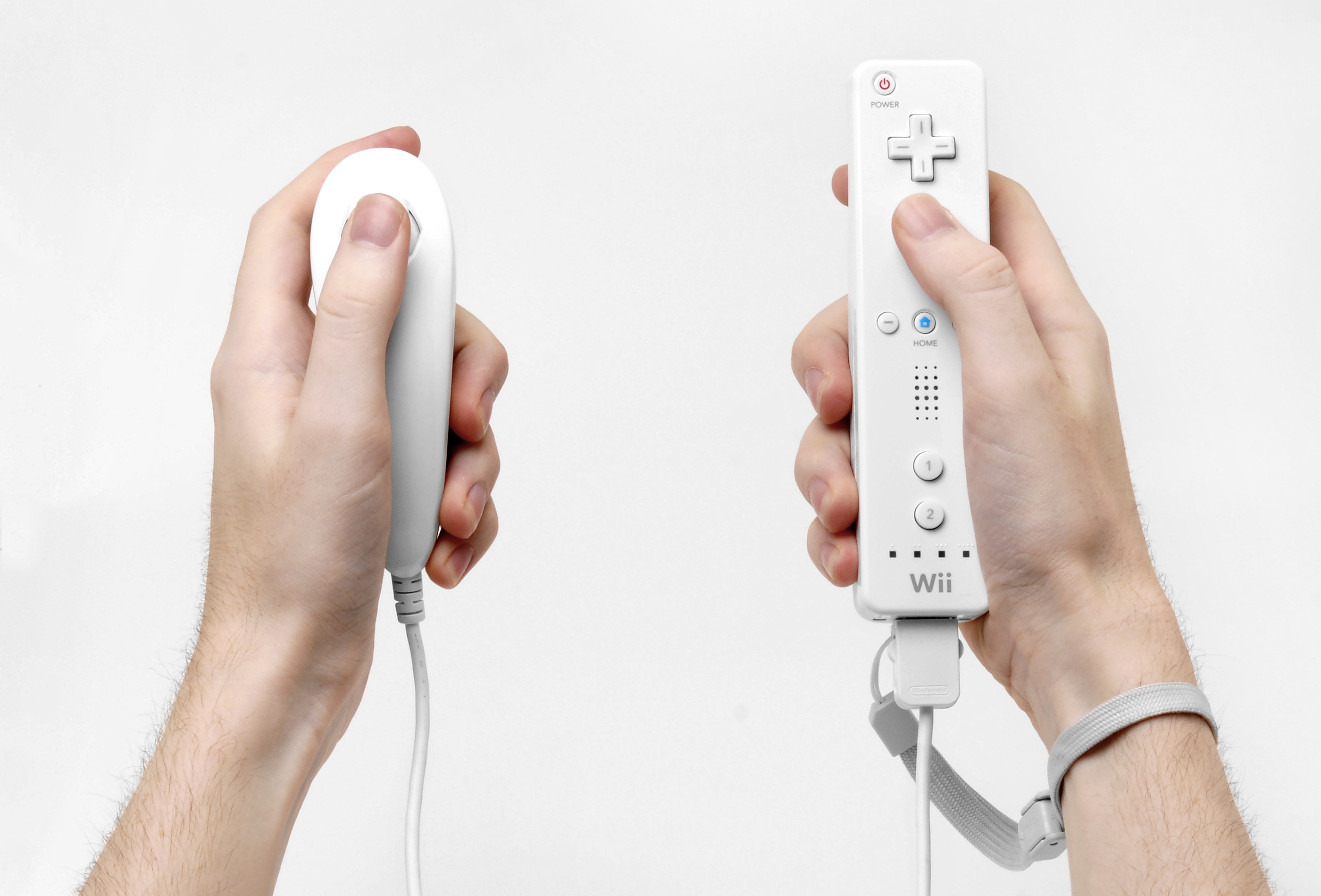
We Ski was designed to utilize the Wii's hardware capabilities, such as its motion controls, to create an intuitive playing experience.

We Ski was produced by Namco Bandai Games employee Yozo Sakagami, a veteran of the company's Ridge Racer series. The publisher suggested to Sakagami that he create a racing game for the Wii that took advantage of the system's hardware capabilities, namely its motion controls. Sakagami quickly began to question if a racing game was suitable for the platform, as the Wii's target demographic consisted of children and parents in their 30s and 40s. He began thinking of a theme that would appeal to any age group, before settling on skiing as he believed the Wii's intuitive controls would make such a game possible and fun to play.

We Ski's development team consisted largely of those that worked on the Ridge Racer games including Ridge Racer 7 director Kenya Kobayashi. It was designed as a successor to Namco's Family series for the Family Computer, which were themed around sports or games and possessed simplistic controls and cute character designs. The soundtrack features music from singer Yumi Matsutoya, in addition to remixes of tracks from older Namco games like Xevious, Klonoa: Door to Phantomile, and The Idolmaster. We Ski is the first third-party game on the Wii to use the Wii Balance Board peripheral.

Bandai Namco released We Ski in Japan on January 31, 2008. It was released in North America on May 13, 2008, and in Europe on June 13, 2008, with Nintendo handling distribution. The Japanese and European versions were titled Family Ski to further tie in its relation with the Family series, and were published under the Namco label. In Japan, it was also released under the Sports WaiWai brand, which included remakes of Family Jockey and Pro Baseball: Family Stadium.

== Reception ==
Reception

Aggregate score
Aggregator	Score
Metacritic	67/100

Review scores
Publication	Score
1Up.com	A
Eurogamer	6/10
Famitsu	30/40
Game Informer	6.25/10
GamePro	3.5/5
GameRevolution	C
GameSpot	7/10
GameZone	6/10
IGN	6/10
Nintendo Power	6/10

We Ski sold 1.2 million copies worldwide by December 2008, making it one of Namco Bandai's most successful releases of the year. The game holds a 67/100 on the review aggregator website Metacritic, indicating "mixed or average reviews".
