= Wii Fit =

2007 video game

- European box art
- Developer: Nintendo EAD
- Publisher: Nintendo
- Director: Hiroshi Matsunaga
- Producer: Tadashi Sugiyama
- Designer: Arisa Hosaka
- Programmer: Katsuhito Nishimura
- Artists: Yauso Inoue; Kazuya Yoshioka; Ryo Koizumi; Motoki Fujita; Teiko Takagai
- Composers: Toru Minegishi; Manaka Kataoka; Shiho Fujii
- Series: Wii
- Platform: Wii
- Release: December 1, 2007: Wii Fit; JP: December 1, 2007; EU: April 25, 2008; AU: May 8, 2008; NA: May 19, 2008; Wii Fit Plus; JP: October 1, 2009; NA: October 4, 2009; AU: October 15, 2009; EU: October 30, 2009
- Genre: Exergaming
- Mode: Single-player

Wii Fit (Note: Japanese: Wiiフィット, Hepburn: Wī Fitto) is a 2007 exergaming video game developed and published by Nintendo for the Wii. It features a variety of yoga, strength training, aerobics, and balance mini-games for use with the Wii Balance Board peripheral. Designer Hiroshi Matsunaga described the game as a "way to help get families exercising together". It has since been adopted by various health clubs around the world, and has previously been used for physiotherapy rehabilitation in children and in nursing homes to improve posture in the elderly.

The game has received generally positive to mixed reviews, despite criticism over the lack of intensity in some of its workout activities. As of March 2022, Wii Fit was the third best selling console game not to be packaged with a console, having sold 22.67 million copies.

Wii Fit Plus, (Note: Japanese: Wiiフィットプラス, Hepburn: Wī Fitto Purasu) an enhanced version featuring additional games, activities, and features, was released for the Wii in October 2009. It also garnered positive reception and was a commercial success; as of March 2022, it is the seventh best-selling game on the Wii, with a total of 21.13 million copies sold. Both versions have sold a combined total of 43.8 million copies, making the game one of the best-selling video games of all time.

== Gameplay ==
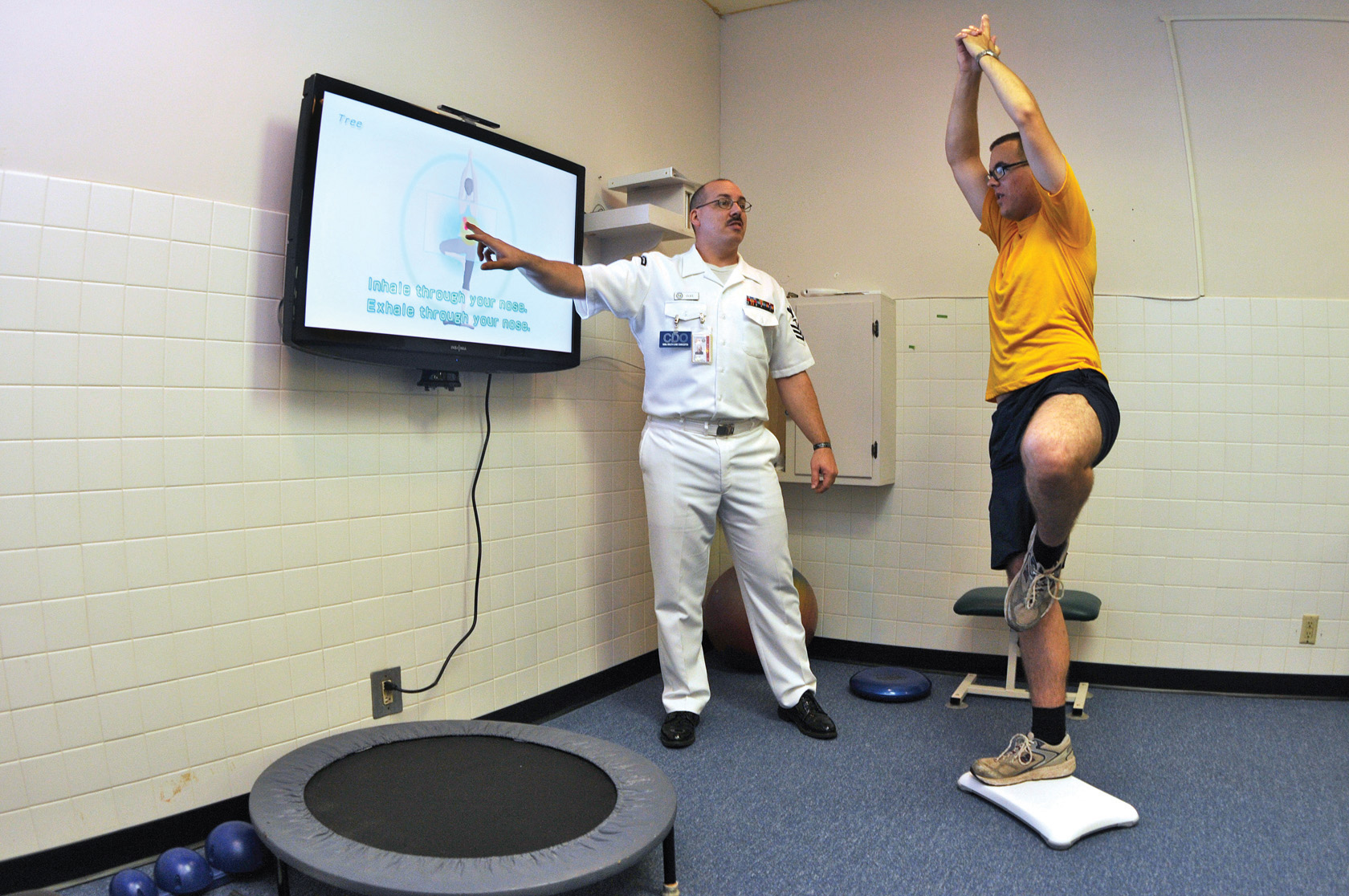
Wii Fit is centered around using the included Balance Board to perform in-game exercises.

Wii Fit requires the use of the Wii Balance Board, a unique platform peripheral that the player stands upon during play. The Wii Balance Board can detect and track the user's center of balance (COB), a feature heavily used in the game; it will also measure weight in the same way as a bathroom scale. Wii Fit contains more than 40 activities designed to engage the player in physical exercise, which consist of yoga poses, strength training, aerobics, and balance games. Most activities generally focus on maintaining COB and improving posture.

Players register and play in Wii Fit via a user profile, assigned with the player's date of birth, height, and Mii character, that keeps track of the player's progress. Physical activities done outside of Wii Fit can also be logged into the profile. Wii Fit allows up to eight different profiles to be registered.

=== Yoga and Strength Training ===
The Yoga and Strength Training activities in Wii Fit provide the player with an on-screen personal trainer who offers direction and evaluation. While standing or otherwise leaning on the Wii Balance Board, the player is instructed to perform the activity by precisely imitating the trainer's actions. In Yoga, the player holds a particular pose or series of poses for a duration of time; while in Strength Training the player performs a set number of repetitions of the exercise selected. During these sessions, the player is shown a visual indication of their COB, represented as a red dot. The trainer advises the player to maintain the COB throughout the activity, requesting that it not move outside a particular threshold usually indicated as a yellow circle. When the activity ends, the player is scored based on how well the player kept their balance during the session: points are deducted if the player's body haphazardly swayed or shook at any point. Wii Fit has 30 Yoga and Strength Training activities.

Yoga	Strength Training
Deep Breathing	Single Leg Extension
Half-Moon	Push-Up and Side Plank
Warrior	Torso Twists
Tree	Jackknife
Sun Salutation	Lunge
Standing Knee	Rowing Squat
Palm Tree	Single Leg Twist
Chair	Sideways Leg Lift
Triangle	Plank
Downward Facing Dog	Triceps Extension
Dance	Arm and Leg Lift
Cobra	Single-Arm Stand
Bridge	Push-Up Challenge
Spinal Twist	Jackknife Challenge
Shoulder Stand	Plank Challenge

=== Aerobics and Balance Games ===
The other two major categories in Wii Fit, Aerobics and Balance Games, consist of 18 minigame activities that feature Miis as playable characters. Aerobics focus on activities that require more vigorous movement, and are divided into three distinct types: hula hooping, step aerobics, and jogging. In Hula Hoop, the player twirls their hips in order to spin a series of hoops, and is scored on the number of spins achieved within a period of time. Step aerobics (simply referred to as "Step" in-game) focus on stepping on and off the Wii Balance Board in a rhythmic fashion. In jogging, which does not use the Wii Balance Board, the player runs in place while keeping the connected Wii Remote in their pocket, which acts as a pseudo-pedometer. The game provides variations of step aerobics and jogging (called "Free Step" and "Free Run" respectively) where the user may exercise at their own pace and does not require viewing the game screen; the player is able to watch television or something similar while performing the exercise. Balance Games consist of nine activities that focus on directly controlling the game using the player's COB. "Soccer Heading", for example, focuses on leaning left or right to control the player's Mii in order to head incoming soccer balls. Another, "Table Tilt", focuses on directing balls into holes by shifting the player's balance to tilt the platform they rest on. Activities based on slalom skiing, snowboarding, and tightrope walking are also available, and a Zazen-based game (called "Lotus Focus") in which the player sits on the Wii Balance Board and remains motionless for a period of time.

Aerobics	Balance Games
Hula Hoop	Soccer Heading ("Heading" in Europe)
Basic Step ("Step Basics" in Europe)	Ski Slalom
Basic Run ("Jogging" in Europe)	Ski Jump
Super Hula Hoop	Table Tilt
Advanced Step ("Step Plus" in Europe)	Tightrope Walk ("Tightrope Tension" in Europe)
2-P Run ("2P Jogging" in Europe)	Balance Bubble
Rhythm Boxing	Penguin Slide
Free Step	Snowboard Slalom
Free Run ("Free Jogging" in Europe)	Lotus Focus ("Zazen" in Europe)

=== Body Test ===
The early body mass index graph used during the game's development

Players may undergo "Body Tests", in which the player's body mass index (BMI) is calculated and balance control is tested. Each Body Test determines and updates the player's "Wii Fit Age", which loosely suggests the player's physical strength in relation to their true age. A standalone application called "Wii Fit Channel" may be installed to the Wii Menu in order for players to perform Body Tests without needing to load the Wii Fit game disc.

== Development ==
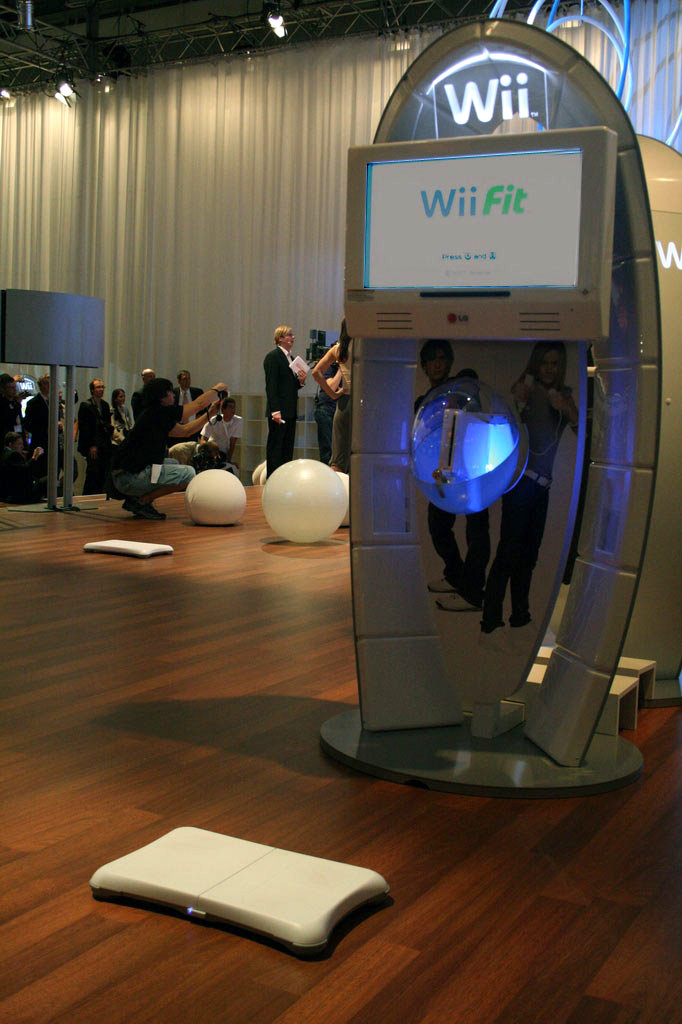
A Wii Fit demonstration booth at the Leipzig Games Convention in August 2007

Wii Fit was first revealed as Wii Health Pack by Nintendo's chief game designer Shigeru Miyamoto, during a conference in mid-September 2006. Then described as a "way to help get families exercising together", the game idea had first been included in Miyamoto's original design document for a core group of games including Wii Sports and Wii Play, the entirety of which was scribbled onto a sheet of paper.

As with other games designed by Miyamoto such as Nintendogs, the design of Wii Fit was influenced by activities in his daily life. He states that he and his family had become more health-conscious, going to the gym and tracking their weight. He found that it had become "fun over time to talk about these things", and as weighing oneself "didn't make much of a game", Nintendo decided to build games around the idea to mesh with the concept. The Wii Balance Board had been worked on for "almost two years", and was inspired by heavy sumo wrestlers' need to weigh themselves with two scales.

The game was announced under its current title at Nintendo's E3 press conference on July 11, 2007, and demonstrated by Miyamoto, Nintendo of America CEO Reggie Fils-Aimé and other participants. Miyamoto revealed that Wii Fit had been developed with a "full-scale" team for a year at the time, and added that there were no plans to integrate WiiConnect24 functionality into the game. He said there was a possibility to take advantage of WiiConnect24 in the future, such as using the service to keep in contact with a doctor to help with rehabilitation, or with a fitness specialist to help with training exercises.

== Wii Fit Plus ==
Wii Fit Plus is an enhanced version of Wii Fit, released in Japan on October 1, 2009, and in other regions in the same month. The game was announced during Nintendo's E3 2009 media briefing on June 2, 2009. It includes all of the original content from Wii Fit along with 15 new balance and aerobics games (referred to as "Training Plus") and six new strength training and yoga activities. New features include a calorie burning counter, the ability for users to create custom fitness regimens or choose from a number of specialized routines based on specific objectives and available time, and the option to create profiles for pets and babies. Users are also able to navigate more quickly between exercises.

Following the commercial success of Wii Fit, producer Shigeru Miyamoto decided to produce a follow-up. Miyamoto learned during Wii Fit Plus development that many Wii Fit owners had stopped playing the game, believing the primary reason to be inconvenience. A new menu interface, My Wii Fit Plus, was implemented to address this issue and make accessing activities quicker and easier. The interface was recreated and adjusted multiple times during development. In designing new minigames for Wii Fit Plus, Miyamoto wanted to create activities that played upon the Stroop effect, requiring coordination of both the player's mind and body; minigames in which the player uses both the Wii Remote and the Wii Balance Board at the same time became a major focus.

== Reception ==
Wii Fit

Aggregate scores
Aggregator	Score
GameRankings	81.18%
Metacritic	80/100

Review scores
Publication	Score
1Up.com	B+
Computer and Video Games	6.8/10
Eurogamer	8/10
GameRevolution	C+
GameSpot	7.0/10
IGN	8.0/10
Nintendo Life	8/10
Official Nintendo Magazine	91%
X-Play	4/5

Wii Fit Plus

Aggregate scores
Aggregator	Score
GameRankings	80.83%
Metacritic	80%

Review scores
Publication	Score
1Up.com	A-
GameSpot	7.5/10
IGN	8.2/10
Nintendo Life	8/10
Nintendo World Report	9/10

Wii Fit was well received. It holds an 81.18% score on GameRankings, aggregated from the scores of 57 media outlets, and got an average score of 81 on MobyGames. While the playful balance and aerobics minigames have generally been praised as simple fun, criticism for the game is aimed at its limitations in offering a serious workout regime. In 1UP.com's review, one such limitation was attributed to the lack of structure the game imposes on the player, stating that while having "complete freedom to choose what you want to do, you might find yourself cheating, despite your best intentions." X-Play also noted that the brief activities are separated by menus, making it difficult for one to keep up a constant heart rate, with GameRevolution criticizing a serious limitation: "as a stand-alone fitness trainer it suffers greatly by the inability to assemble a full, unbroken workout without the horrible 'fitness interruptus' necessitated by bothersome menu navigation and obtrusive Wii remote usage." Some have also pointed out a lack of Nintendo's usual charm in game design, specifically in the yoga and strength training exercises which take place in a muted setting that one critic referred to as "the world's most lifeless, depressing gym." Despite these limitations, the game's friendly front-end and amount of activities are cited as appealing features to those who are perhaps seeking an introduction to daily exercise. In a review on IGN, Wii Fit was said to create "an environment in which working out is less daunting and as a result enjoyable – fun, even."

According to a study published in the Journal of Physical Activity and Health, the aerobics portion of Wii Fit was not sufficient to maintain a heart rate of the recommended intensity (known in sports physiology as a target heart rate) for maintaining cardiorespiratory fitness.

A study published by Tokyo's National Institute of Health and Nutrition concluded that only 33% of the exercises (22 of a total of 68) qualified as medium-intensity, with the rest as low-intensity. No exercises qualified as high-intensity. The researchers concluded that only one-third of the exercises qualify towards the exercise guidelines provided by the American College of Sports Medicine (ACSM) and the American Heart Association (AHA), and that the exercises offered less benefits "than authentic sports or exercises because playing these active video games involved little horizontal locomotion." However, to reach 30 minutes of moderate activity (5 times a week) as suggested by the ACSM, significantly more time is required, due to the repeated manual navigations of the menus required between each exercise and the inability to program customized exercise routines, repetitions, or time limits (or even personalized intensities—the "trainer" will never modify the speed based on the user's fitness level).

Wii Fit was awarded Best Use of the Balance Board by IGN in its 2008 video game awards. It was also nominated for multiple other awards, including Best New IP and Best Sports Game. Hyper commends the game for its "effective exercise program, its accessibility and its massive novelty value". However, he criticized it for not being a "gamer's game and no good for long sessions".

Cycling Weekly reported that Mark Cavendish, a double Madison World Champion and Commonwealth Games gold medalist bike racer, had to stop his training regime when he injured his left calf's gastrocnemius after falling off the balance board while playing Wii Fit.

There was minor controversy regarding Wii Fit in the UK, where two parents complained after the known limitations of BMI led to their daughter being labeled as overweight. Nintendo apologized over any offense caused by the terminology used in-game.

During the 12th Annual Interactive Achievement Awards, the Academy of Interactive Arts & Sciences nominated Wii Fit for "Family Game of the Year" and "Outstanding Innovation in Gaming".

Wii Fit Plus generally received positive reviews from critics. GameRankings reports an aggregate score of 80.83% based on 18 reviews, and Metacritic reports a score of 80% based on 33 reviews. IGN gave Wii Fit Plus a score of 8.2. GameSpot gave it a 7.5 out of 10. 1UP gave it an A−, stating, "There's still some tightening up to be done, but Wii Fit Plus is a definite improvement in the format." The Academy of Interactive Arts & Sciences also nominated Wii Fit Plus for "Family Game of the Year" at the 13th Annual Interactive Achievement Awards.

In May 2010, the AHA endorsed the Wii to encourage sedentary people to take the first step toward fitness. The AHA heart icon covers the console itself along with two of its more active games, Wii Fit Plus and Wii Sports Resort.

=== Sales ===
Wii Fit sold over a quarter of a million copies in its first week, and, despite not being released outside Japan, one million copies of Wii Fit had been sold by January 6, 2008, after being released on December 1, 2007. As of January 4, 2009, it had sold 3,125,000 copies in Japan. In Japan it was also the third best-selling game and the best-selling Wii game of 2008, selling 2,149,131 in that year.

Prior to release, consumer reaction was also positive in the United Kingdom, with some retailers having to stop taking pre-orders due to its increasing popularity. Reports in the United Kingdom state that the Wii Fit launch had seen queues form nationwide. Retailer Woolworths said that the game was selling 90 copies per minute. Nintendo UK said that in April 2008 that it was working hard to ensure that enough stock was available. In its first week of release, Wii Fit was the best-selling video game in the week, topping the all-format chart. Despite the game being sold at a higher price than average (£70, compared to an average of £35–40) it became the UK's sixth fastest selling console title according to Chart-Track/ELSPA and made over £16 million in sales. During the week beginning May 19, 2008, Wii Fit's sales in the UK fell from second in the all-formats chart to dropping out of the top 40 altogether, believed to be caused by Wii Fit being completely sold out.

In the United States Wii Fit was reported to have sold out at pre-launch sales of retailers Amazon.com, GameStop and Wal-Mart. After the initial release, reports showed stores selling out of Wii Fit nationwide. Michael Pachter, an analyst with Wedbush Securities, estimated that Nintendo shipped only 500,000 copies of the game in North America as opposed to as many as two million units to Europe. According to Pachter, the Wii Fit units were allocated by Nintendo to maximize profit, by prioritizing Europe over North America, taking advantage of the strong value of the euro compared to the US dollar. According to the NPD Group, Wii Fit sold 690,000 units in the US in May 2008, making it the country's third highest selling title for the month, behind the Xbox 360 version of Grand Theft Auto IV and Mario Kart Wii, but ahead of the PlayStation 3 version of Grand Theft Auto IV. Wii Fit debuted in the United States at a suggested retail price of US$89.99 for the base system unbundled with other accessories. As with the Wii console itself, the demand for Wii Fit far outstripped the supply. The perceived shortage created a secondary market for people to purchase Wii Fit at retail outlets and sell it on for a profit. In June 2008, Wii Fit was reported to be selling at an average of $175 per unit on Amazon.com and eBay.

According to the NPD Group, GfK Chart-Track, and Enterbrain, from January to July 2008 the game sold 1.433 million copies in the United States, 624,000 in the United Kingdom, and 1.547 million in Japan, a total of 3.604 million. By March 31, 2009, Nintendo had sold 18.22 million copies of Wii Fit worldwide. According to the NPD Group, GfK Chart-Track, and Enterbrain, in the third quarter of 2008 the game sold 1.283 million copies in the United States, 460,000 in the United Kingdom, and 346,000 in Japan, a total of 2.089 million copies. Wii Fit was the third best-selling game of December 2008 in the United States, selling over 999,000 copies. It was also the third best-selling game of 2008 in the United States, selling over 4.53 million.

Within 18 months, by June 2009, the game helped health games generate revenues of $2 billion, most of which was grossed by Wii Fit's 18.22 million sales at the time. Wii Fit ultimately received a "Diamond" sales award from the Entertainment and Leisure Software Publishers Association (ELSPA), indicating sales of at least 1 million copies in the United Kingdom. As of March 2012 the game had sold 22.67 million copies worldwide, and was 6th on the best-selling Wii games list.

Wii Fit Plus sold 2.16 million copies worldwide within one month of its release and by September 2018 had sold 21.13 million units worldwide.

== Other uses ==
Wii Fit has been used for physiotherapy rehabilitation, and gaming rehabilitation and has been adopted by various health clubs around the world.

Wii Fit has also been used for the treatment of balance problems in the elderly. In a study, an 86-year-old woman was unable to walk without close supervision, even with a walker, due to poor balance and a tendency to fall, after a stroke. She participated in four training sessions along with physical therapy. She was tested on the outcome measures of Berg Balance Scale (BBS), the Functional Reach and Lateral Reach tests, Timed Up & Go test (TUG), computerized posturography, and the Short Feedback Questionnaire (SFQ). This was done before the first training session and after the last one. From the results and her own feedback, she had improved antero-posterior symmetry of stance. "When released from hospital, she was able to walk with a walker with minimal supervision."

In summer 2009, Finnish Defence Forces support organisation invested in 384 Wii consoles (including Wii Sports and Wii Fit) for military bases around the country, in order to inspire soldiers to exercise more in their free time. The feedback from the conscripts and officers was positive.

Some nursing homes use Wii Fit as a way to engage in gentle exercise. The system is used to give the residents a yoga workout along with flexibility and balance exercises. The game allows those who are unable to perform rigorous daily exercise to increase their heart rate and improve their overall health. Depending on their level of mobility, some can perform the exercises while standing, while others may remain seated.

== Legacy ==
=== Successors ===
The third installment in the series, Wii Fit U, was released for the successor to the Wii, the Wii U. While maintaining most of the overall features of its predecessors, the game uses the Wii U GamePad and can also sync data with the optional Fit Meter, a pedometer accessory which measures activities such as steps taken and altitude. Released on the Nintendo eShop in October and November 2013 to major markets, a retail version, made available in Europe and Australia in December 2013, was scheduled for release in North America in January 2014, and in Japan the following month.

A new exercising game for the Nintendo Switch, Ring Fit Adventure, was released on October 18, 2019. It attaches the right Switch Controller on a wheel peripheral included in the game (called the Ring-Con) and attaches the left Switch Controller to their left thigh by a Leg Strap. This is intended to perform more complex maneuvers for stretching, poses, and jogging in place: compared to the Wii Fit Board. This game introduces a new protagonist (Ring Fit Trainee) who performs these exercises to go on a role-playing adventure. The Trainee has their own Ring-Con ingame that can be used to defeat mobs in combat.

=== Super Smash Bros. ===
The female Wii Fit trainer was revealed at E3 2013 to be a playable character in the video game Super Smash Bros. for Nintendo 3DS and Wii U upon its announcement at the convention. Series director Masahiro Sakurai noted that while he expected that people would see no meaning behind the trainer's inclusion, he included her because of his perception of her uniqueness and to surprise people, instead of doing so for "cheap novelty." It was later revealed by Sakurai, in commemoration of the release of the trial version of Wii Fit U, that the male trainer would also appear, albeit as an alternate character that shares the female's slot and characteristics. The Wii Fit Trainers were announced to return in the series' next installment Super Smash Bros. Ultimate alongside every fighter that has appeared in the series' history at the 2018 E3 convention.

According to US Gamer, the female Wii Fit Trainer has gained a cult following her announcement in Super Smash Bros. for Nintendo 3DS and Wii U, initially receiving positive attention from people on the Internet as well as skepticism from critics such as PC Magazine's Will Greenwald and Mike Fahey of Kotaku. Some critics, however, praised her inclusion; Patricia Hernandez wrote that Wii Fit Trainer was one of her favorite characters in Nintendo 3DS and Wii U, citing their uniqueness and charm as factors, and Cecilia D'Anastasio said that characters like Wii Fit Trainer were what made the game worth playing.

== See also ==
- Wii series
- Fitness Boxing
