= Wii Balance Board =

Accessory for the Wii and Wii U

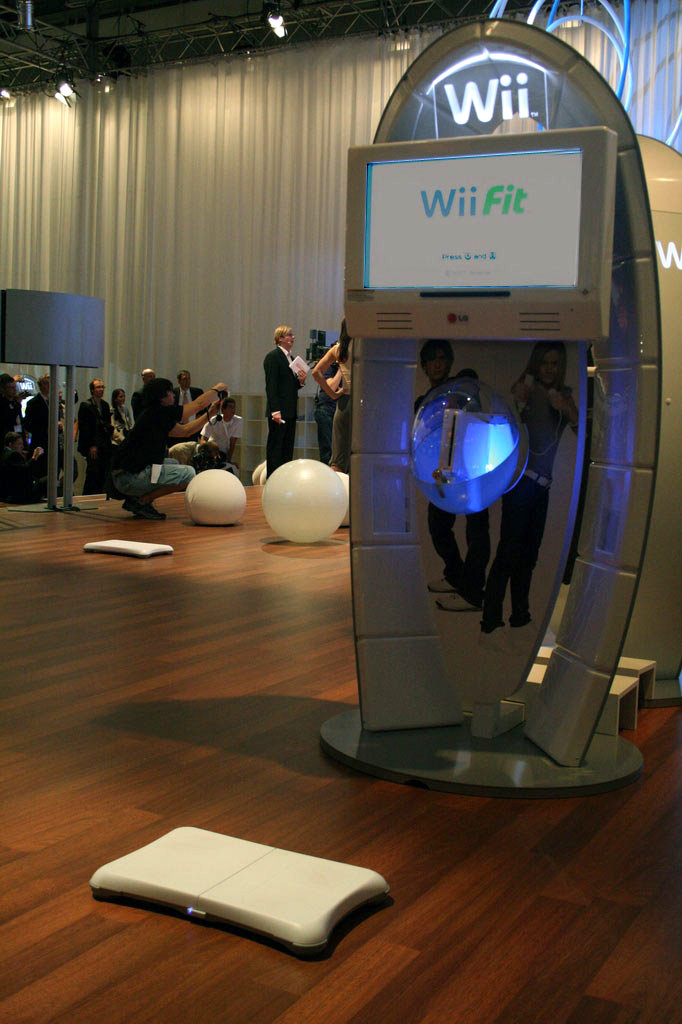
- The Wii Balance Board, connected to a Wii Fit demo at the Leipzig Games Convention in August 2007
- Manufacturer: Nintendo
- Product family: Wii
- Type: Game controller
- Generation: Seventh generation
- Released: JP: December 10, 2007; EU: April 26, 2008; AU: May 8, 2008; NA: May 19, 2008; KOR: December 6, 2008

The Wii Balance Board (Japanese: バランスWiiボード, Hepburn: Baransu Wī Bōdo) is an accessory for the Wii and Wii U video game consoles. Unlike the usual balance board for exercise, it does not rock but instead tracks the user's center of balance. Along with Wii Fit, it was introduced on July 11, 2007, at the Electronic Entertainment Expo.

== Design ==
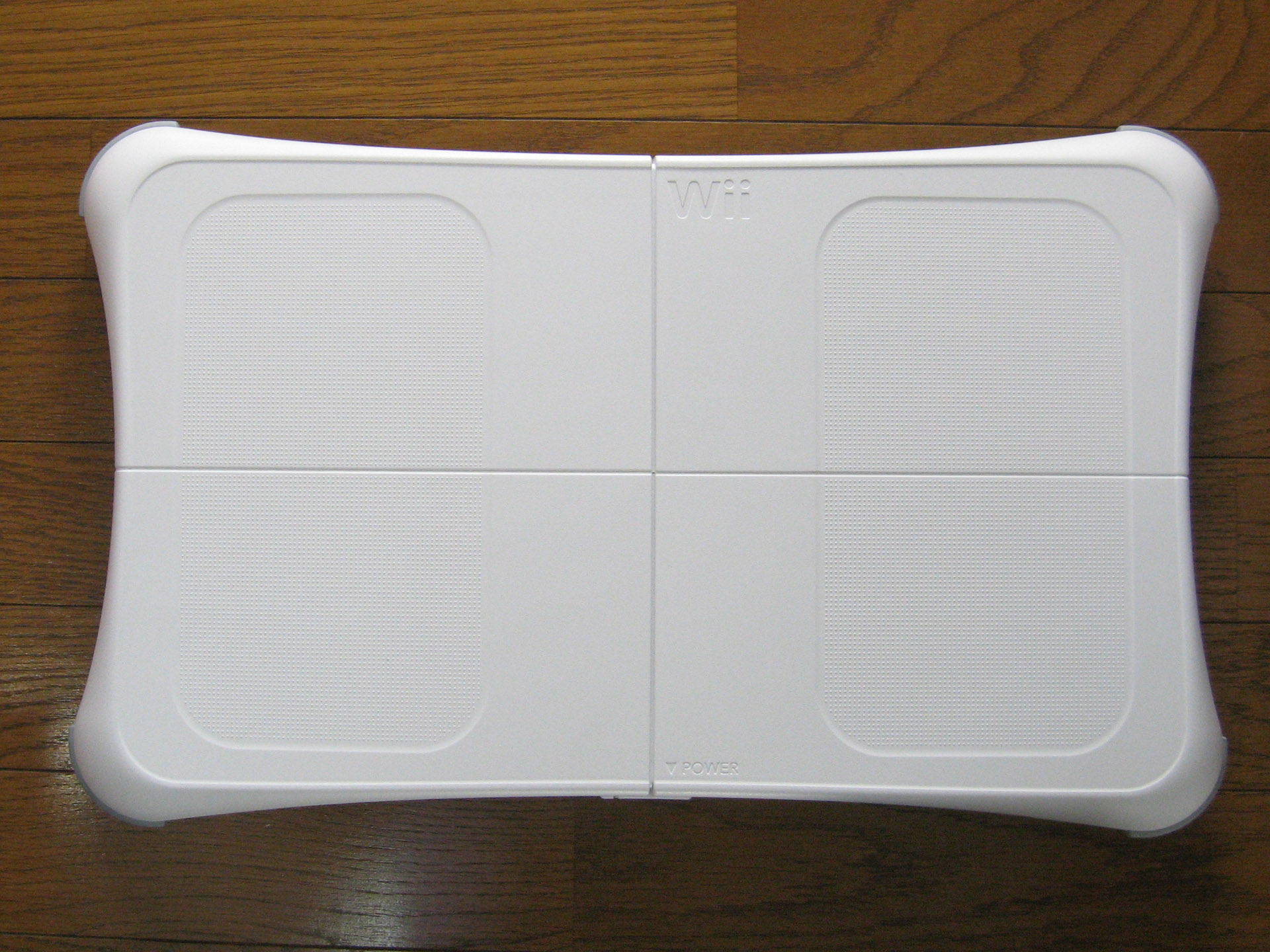

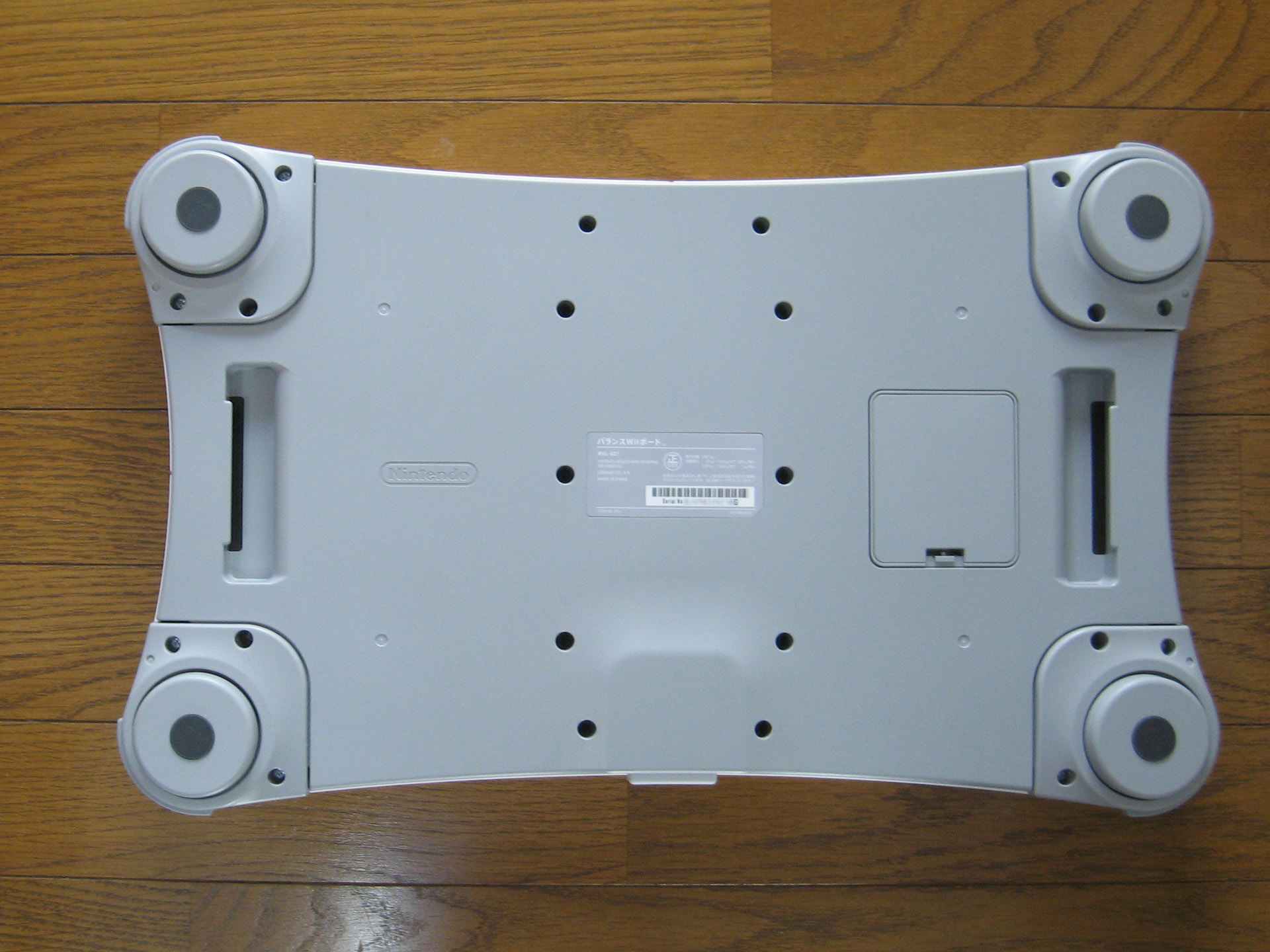
The top and bottom of the Wii Balance Board, without foot extensions

The Wii Balance Board is shaped like a household body scale, with a plain white top and light gray bottom. It runs on four AA batteries as a power source, which can power the board for about 60 hours. The board uses Bluetooth technology and contains four pressure sensors that are used to measure the user's center of balance—the location of the intersection between an imaginary line drawn vertically through the center of pressure and the surface of the Balance Board—and weight. In an interview conducted by gaming web site IGN, Shigeru Miyamoto stated that the Balance Board's ability to measure weight is probably more accurate than that of a typical bathroom scale.

Although the Japanese packaging states that it is designed to support people weighing up to 136 kilograms (300 pounds) and the "Western" Balance Board up to 150 kg (330 pounds), they are actually the same board. The packaging differs due to regulatory differences between Japan and overseas markets. The sensors on the board can accurately measure up to 150 kg (330 pounds). The actual physical structure of the board can withstand much greater force equivalent to around 300 kg (660 pounds).

Due to the similarities between the two products, the Wii Balance Board has been compared to the Joyboard, a peripheral released for the Atari VCS in 1982 by Amiga Corporation. The technology in the Joyboard was less advanced than that in the Wii Balance Board, with four directional switches instead of pressure sensors.

The manual says that the Balance Board should only be used on a hard surface or thin carpet, as thicker or softer surfaces may cause the board to operate incorrectly. A set of foot extensions is available to allow the board to be used on softer surfaces. The extension feet are included with some versions of the Balance Board, but not in European versions.

The balance board should be used bare-footed; socks do not properly grip the hard surface, and can create a danger. Novelty Wii Fit non-skid socks, which have small rubber pads on the sole that do not slide easily, were provided to members of Club Nintendo.

== Development ==
The balance board's development was tightly coupled with the development of the Wii Fit game. Nintendo initially contacted manufacturers of normal bathroom scales, but ended up building the board without their help in an effort to keep down costs. In early development models, the balance board was a simple scale with one load cell. However, the developers realized that a simple scale was not useful as a game accessory and expanded the number of load cells to two, then four. The idea to use multiple sensors was partly inspired by how sumo wrestlers weigh themselves (using two scales). The shape of the balance board was initially a square, but it was decided that it was too hard to use for the exercises.

For a large part of the development process, the board was an extension controller to a normal Wii remote. The effects of this are seen in the released balance board, which acts as a Wii remote with the front button mapped to "A" and all load cells on an "extension controller".

== Software ==
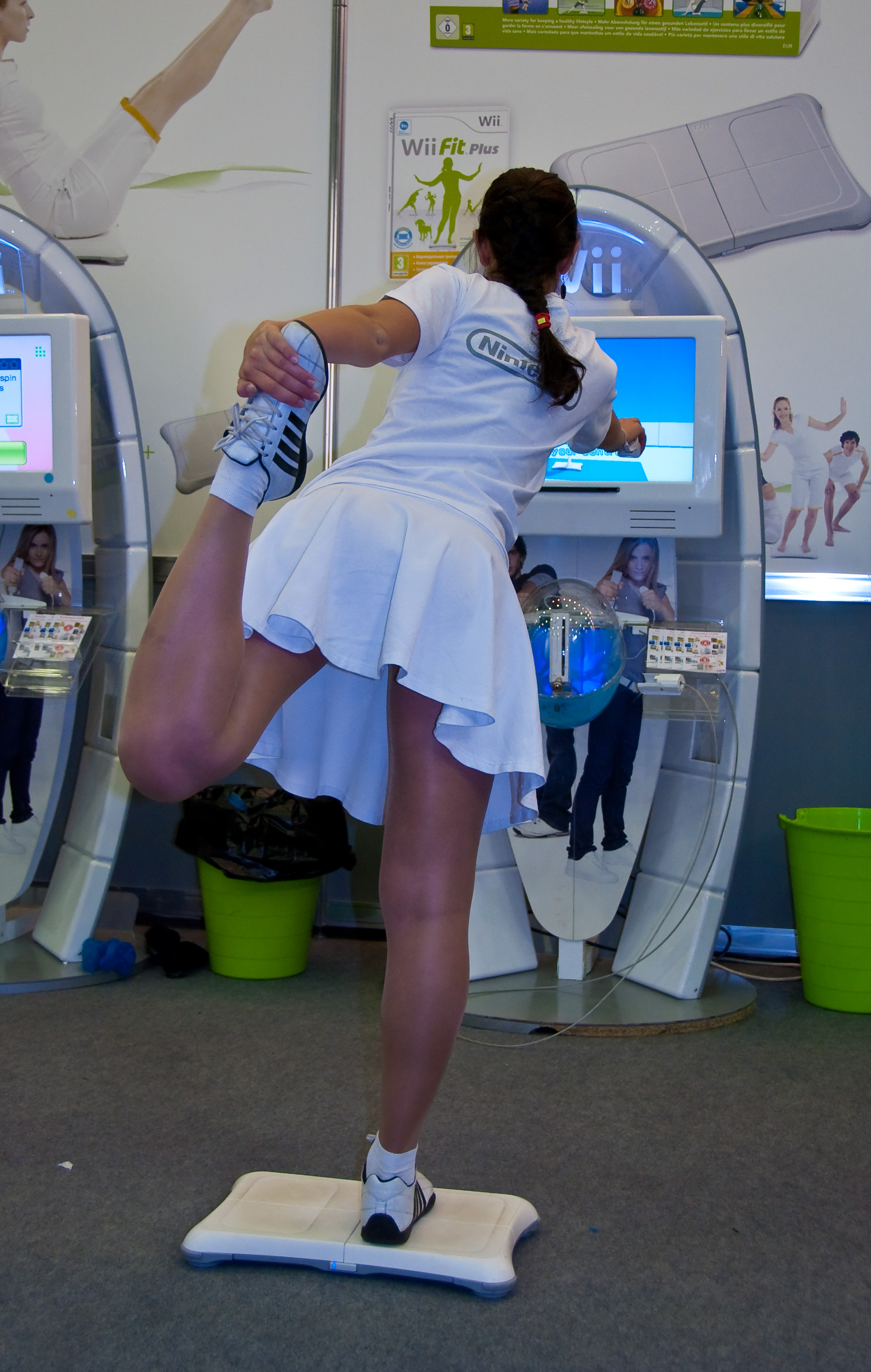
A person using the Balance Board while playing Wii Fit

Wii Fit is the first game to have made use of the Wii Balance Board. Shortly after Wii Fit's release, Shigeru Miyamoto noted the potential for other uses, stating that "probably the simplest and most straightforward [idea] would be a snowboarding game". Miyamoto has also stated that Nintendo received "many inquiries" from third parties following the announcement of Wii Fit and the Wii Balance Board, as well as receiving interest from the physical fitness industry.

We Ski by Bandai Namco Games is the first third-party game to have made use of the Wii Balance Board, in conjunction with the Wii Remote and Nunchuk attachment.

The Wii Balance Board is officially compatible with both Wii and Wii U. Only one Balance Board can be synchronized with the system at a time and the board uses the fourth player controller connection, replacing any Wii Remotes that are currently bound to that position. Due to these two limitations, there is no ability to use multiple Balance Boards simultaneously and the maximum number of players who can play a non-hotseat multiplayer mode involving it is reduced to 3. Some homebrew developers allowed the board to be unofficially supported by the Linux kernel 3.7.

== Measuring center of pressure displacement ==
A shift of center of pressure (CoP) is an indirect measure of postural sway and thus a measure of a person’s ability to maintain balance. Though originally designed as a video game controller, the Balance Board has become a tool for assessing CoP which has proven to be both valid and reliable. Clark et al. performed a study to prove the validity and test-retest reliability of the use of a Balance Board. The reason to use a Balance Board instead of a force platform is the ability to "create a portable, inexpensive balance assessment system that has widespread availability." Four standing balance tasks were used in this study including a combination of double stance, single stance, eyes open, and eyes closed. Throughout these tests the center of pressure path length was measured and compared to data from an identical study on a laboratory-grade force platform. The study found Balance Board measurements to be reliable and consistently repeatable.

== Use to improve balance ==
Several studies have been carried out to determine the effects of programs utilizing the Nintendo Wii console and balance board on balance control and functional performance in independently functioning older adults. In a meta-analysis, seven studies were examined, four comparing Wii exercise with no exercise, and three comparing with other exercise programs. It was found that results with the Wii were better than no exercise, and comparable with other programs in improving balance control. However, the analysis concluded that "definitive recommendations as to optimal treatment protocols and the potential of such an intervention as a safe and effective home-based treatment cannot be made at this point".

== Reception ==
The Wii Balance Board sold 32 million units worldwide between its launch and November 2010, and set a new Guinness World Record for "best-selling personal weighing device". By January 2012, it had sold 42 million units.
