= List of video games that support Wii MotionPlus =

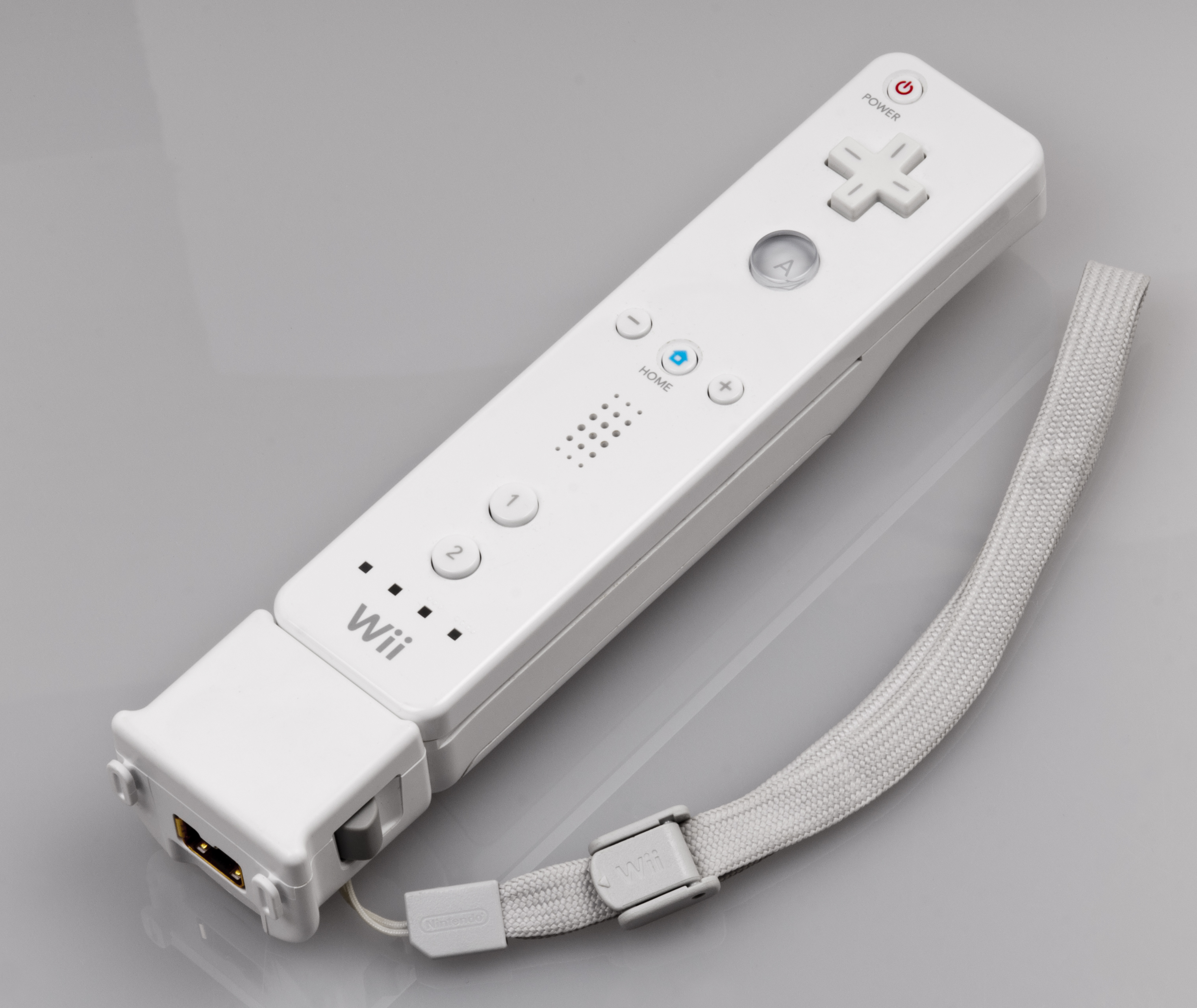
Wii MotionPlus attached to the Wii Remote

This is a list of Wii and Wii U video games that support the Wii MotionPlus accessory as input.

There are 58 games which support Wii MotionPlus.

== Wii ==
Title	Developer	Publisher	Bundled with Wii MotionPlus	Bundled with Wii Remote Plus	Required	Release date: North America	Release date: Japan	Release date: Europe	Release date: Australasia
Academy of Champions	Ubisoft Vancouver	Ubisoft			No	November 3, 2009		September 4, 2009	September 3, 2009
The Adventures of Tintin: The Secret of the Unicorn	Ubisoft Montpellier	Ubisoft			No	December 6, 2011		October 21, 2011	December 1, 2011
All Round Hunter	505 Games	505 Games			No			June 25, 2010	June 24, 2010
All Star Karate	Blitz Games	THQ			No	April 20, 2010		May 21, 2010	
B-Units: Build It!	505 Games	505 Games			Yes			July 1, 2011	
Backyard Sports: Sandlot Sluggers	Atari	Humongous			No	May 25, 2010			
Baseball Blast	WayForward	2K Sports			No	September 25, 2009			
Brunswick Zone Cosmic Bowling	CokeM Interactive	GameMill Entertainment			No	September 10, 2010			
The Cages: Pro Style Batting Practice	Alpha Unit	Konami; JP Alpha Unit			No	July 6, 2010	July 16, 2009		
Conduit 2	High Voltage Software	Sega			No	April 19, 2011		April 22, 2011	April 21, 2011
Crazy Mini Golf 2	Data Design Interactive	Data Design Interactive			No	November 5, 2009			
Cruise Ship Vacation Games	Frozen Codebase	Activision			No	September 3, 2009		September 7, 2010	
Dance Sensation!	Alpine Studios Inc.	Majesco			No	May 14, 2010			
Deca Sports 3	Hudson Soft	Hudson Soft			No	October 26, 2010			
Exerbeat	Namco Bandai Games	Namco Bandai Games			No	May 17, 2011	December 9, 2010	May 27, 2011	May 12, 2011
Fishing Resort	Prope	XSEED Games			No	November 22, 2011	August 4, 2011		
FlingSmash	Artoon	Nintendo		Yes	Yes	November 7, 2010	November 18, 2010	November 19, 2010	
The Garfield Show: Threat of the Space Lasagna	Eko System	Zoo Games			No	June 22, 2010		June 22, 2010	
Get Fit with Mel B	Lightning Fish	Deep Silver/Black Bean Games			No	September 14, 2011		November 26, 2010	October 25, 2010
Go Vacation	Namco Bandai Games	Namco Bandai Games			No	October 11, 2011	October 20, 2011	November 4, 2011	November 17, 2011
Grand Slam Tennis	EA Canada	EA Sports	Some		No	June 8, 2009	June 26, 2009	June 12, 2009	June 11, 2009
Hooked! Again: Real Motion Fishing	Arc System Works	Aksys Games			No	November 3, 2009			
James Cameron's Avatar: The Game	Ubisoft Montreal	Ubisoft			No	December 1, 2009		December 4, 2009	
Jillian Michaels Fitness Ultimatum 2011	Collision Studios	D3Publisher			No	November 16, 2010			
The Legend of Zelda: Skyward Sword	Nintendo EAD	Nintendo		Some	Yes	November 20, 2011	November 23, 2011	November 18, 2011	November 24, 2011
Let's Dance	Lightning Fish	Maximum Family Games			No	April 24, 2012		June 24, 2011	
Let's Paint	Frontline Studios	Zoo Digital Publishing			No	June 1, 2010			
Mathews Bowhunting	Zoo Games	Zoo Games			No	October 19, 2010			
Mini Golf Resort	Teyon	Trivola			No	2010			
Minute to Win It	Smack Down Productions	Zoo Games			No	November 5, 2010			
My Personal Golf Trainer	Data Design Interactive	XS Games			Yes	September 30, 2010		May 28, 2011	
New Carnival Games	Cat Daddy Games	2K Play	Some		No	September 21, 2010			
NewU Fitness First Mind Body, Yoga & Pilates Workout	Lightning Fish	Black Bean Games			No			March 19, 2010	
NHL 2K10	Visual Concepts	2K Sports	Some		No	September 15, 2009		October 23, 2009	
NHL 2K11	Visual Concepts	2K Sports			No	September 24, 2010			
Petanque Master	Mere Mortals	Bigben Interactive			No			July 23, 2010	
PDC World Championship Darts Pro Tour	Redoubt, Rebellion Developments	O-Games			No			November 26, 2010	
Power Punch	Grandprix Inc.	XS Games			No	February 23, 2010			
PSA World Tour Squash	Alternative Software	Alternative Software			No			May 22, 2015	
Racquet Sports	Ubisoft	Ubisoft			No	March 9, 2010		March 25, 2010	March 25, 2010
Raving Rabbids: Travel in Time	Ubisoft Paris	Ubisoft			No	November 21, 2010	January 27, 2011	November 26, 2010	November 25, 2010
Rec Room Games	Arcade Moon	Destineer			No	December 7, 2009			
Red Steel 2	Ubisoft Paris	Ubisoft	Some		Yes	March 23, 2010	May 7, 2010	March 26, 2010	March 25, 2010
Shaun White Snowboarding: World Stage	Ubisoft Montreal	Ubisoft			No	November 8, 2009		November 13, 2009	
SpongeBob's Truth or Square	Heavy Iron Studios	THQ			No	November 3, 2009	February 28, 2010	December 2009	
Swords	Panic Button	Majesco			No	September 20, 2010			
The Hip Hop Dance Experience	iNiS	Ubisoft			No	November 13, 2012			
Thomas & Friends: Hero of the Rails	Silverball Studios	Barnstorm Games			No			August 20, 2010	August 20, 2010
Tiger Woods PGA Tour 10	EA Tiburon	EA Sports	Some		No	June 8, 2009		July 3, 2009	July 3, 2009
Tiger Woods PGA Tour 11	EA Tiburon	EA Sports			No	Jun 8, 2010			
Tiger Woods PGA Tour 12: The Masters	EA Tiburon	EA Sports			No	Mar 29, 2011			
Tron: Evolution - Battle Grids	n-Space	Disney Interactive Studios			No	December 7, 2010			
Virtua Tennis 4	Sega-AM3	Sega			No	April 29, 2011	2011	2011	
Virtua Tennis 2009	Sumo Digital	Sega	Some		No	June 2, 2009		June 19, 2009	June 19, 2009
Wii Play: Motion	Nintendo EAD	Nintendo		Yes	Yes	June 13, 2011	July 7, 2011	June 24, 2011	June 30, 2011
Wii Sports Resort	Nintendo EAD	Nintendo	Some	^{JP and US}	Yes	July 26, 2009	June 25, 2009	July 24, 2009	July 23, 2009
Zangeki no Reginleiv	Sandlot	Nintendo			No		February 11, 2010		
Zumba Fitness	Majesco	Pipeworks Software			No	November 18, 2010		November 26, 2010	

=== WiiWare ===
Title	Developer	Publisher	Required	Release date N. America	Release date Japan	Release date Europe	Release date Australasia
GhostSlayer	Gevo Entertainment	Gevo Entertainment	No	February 22, 2010			
Rage of the Gladiator	Ghostfire Games	Ghostfire Games	No	March 15, 2010		April 16, 2010	
Sekai no Omoshiro Party Game	SIMS	SIMS	No		April 20, 2010		
Sekai no Omoshiro Party Game 2	SIMS	SIMS	No		May 11, 2010		
ShadowPlay	Deep Fried Entertainment	Deep Fried Entertainment	No	January 11, 2010			

=== Unreleased ===
- The Grinder, developed by High Voltage Software

== Wii U ==
Title	Developer	Publisher	Bundled with Wii MotionPlus	Bundled with Wii Remote Plus	Required	Release date: North America	Release date: Japan	Release date: Europe	Release date: Australasia
Nintendo Land	Nintendo EAD	Nintendo	No	Some	Required for some games	November 18, 2012	December 8, 2012	November 30, 2012	November 30, 2012
ESPN Sports Connection ^{NA} Sports Connection ^{WW}	Ubisoft Barcelona, Longtail Studios	Ubisoft	No	No	Required when playing without GamePad	November 18, 2012	December 20, 2012	November 30, 2012	November 30, 2012
Pikmin 3	Nintendo EAD	Nintendo	No	No	No	August 4, 2013	July 13, 2013	July 26, 2013	July 27, 2013
Splatoon	Nintendo EAD	Nintendo	No	No	Required for Motion Control	May 29, 2015	May 28, 2015	May 29, 2015	May 30, 2015
Wii Party U	Nd Cube, Nintendo SPD	Nintendo	No	Some	No	October 25, 2013	October 31, 2013	October 25, 2013	October 26, 2013
Wii Fit U	Nintendo EAD, Ganbarion	Nintendo	No	No	Required for some games	November 1, 2013	October 31, 2013	November 1, 2013	November 2, 2013
Wii Sports Club	Nintendo EAD	Nintendo	No	No	Yes	November 7, 2013	November 7, 2013	November 7, 2013	November 7, 2013
Mario & Sonic at the Sochi 2014 Olympic Winter Games	SEGA	Nintendo	No	Yes	Yes	November 15, 2013	December 5, 2013	November 8, 2013	November 9, 2013
