= Swiney (surname) =

Swiney is a surname. Notable people with the surname include:

- C. C. Swiney (born 1981), American writer, actor and comedian
- Erwin Swiney (born 1978), American football player
- Frances Swiney (1847–1922), British feminist, writer and theosophist
- George Swiney (1793–1844), English physician and founder of the Swiney Prize
- Nick Swiney (born 1999), American baseball player
- Tom Swiney (1875–1945), Australian politician

== See also ==
- Swiney Prize, awarded every five years for medical or general jurisprudence
