= Principles of motion sensing =

Sensors able to detect three-dimensional motion have been commercially available for several decades and have been used in automobiles, aircraft and ships. However, initial size, power consumption and price had prevented their mass adoption in consumer electronics. While there are other kinds of motion detector technologies available commercially, there are four principle types of motion sensors which are important for motion processing in the consumer electronics market.

== Motion sensors ==
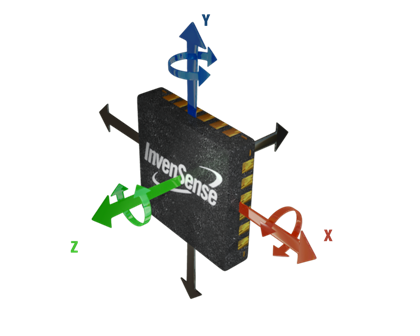
InvenSense motion processing

=== Accelerometers ===
Accelerometers measure linear acceleration and tilt angle. Single- and multi-axis accelerometers detect the combined magnitude and direction of linear, rotational and gravitational acceleration. They can be used to provide limited motion sensing functionality. For example, a device with an accelerometer can detect rotation from vertical to horizontal state in a fixed location. As a result, accelerometers are primarily used for simple motion sensing applications in consumer devices such as changing the screen of a mobile device from portrait to landscape orientation. Apple iPhones and the Nintendo Wii incorporate accelerometers.

=== Gyroscopes ===
Gyroscopes measure the angular rate of rotational movement about one or more axes. Gyroscopes can measure complex motion accurately in multiple dimensions, tracking the position and rotation of a moving object unlike accelerometers which can only detect the fact that an object has moved or is moving in a particular direction. Further, unlike accelerometers and compasses, gyroscopes are not affected by errors related to external environmental factors such as gravitational and magnetic fields. Hence, gyroscopes greatly enhance the motion sensing capabilities of devices and are used for advanced motion sensing applications in consumer devices such as full gesture and movement detection and simulation in video gaming. The Nintendo Wii MotionPlus accessory and the Nintendo 3DS incorporate gyroscopes.

=== Compasses ===
Magnetic sensors, commonly referred to as compasses, detect magnetic fields and measure their absolute position relative to Earth's magnetic north and nearby magnetic materials. Information from magnetic sensors can also be used to correct errors from other sensors such as accelerometers. One example of how compass sensors are used in consumer devices is reorienting a displayed map to match up with the general direction a user is facing.

=== Barometers ===
Pressure sensors, also known as barometers, measure relative and absolute altitude through the analysis of changing atmospheric pressure. Pressure sensors can be used in consumer devices for sports and fitness or location-based applications where information on elevation can be valuable.

=== Additional ===
An example of an immersive musical experience through motion and gesture is accomplished with a musical infrared harp.
