= Zelda Wii =

Zelda Wii may refer to three different video games in The Legend of Zelda series for the Wii console:

- The Legend of Zelda: Twilight Princess, released in 2006
- The Legend of Zelda: Skyward Sword, released in 2011
- Link's Crossbow Training, a spinoff game in The Legend of Zelda series, released in 2007
