= Nyko Wand =

Third-party game controllers

Wand
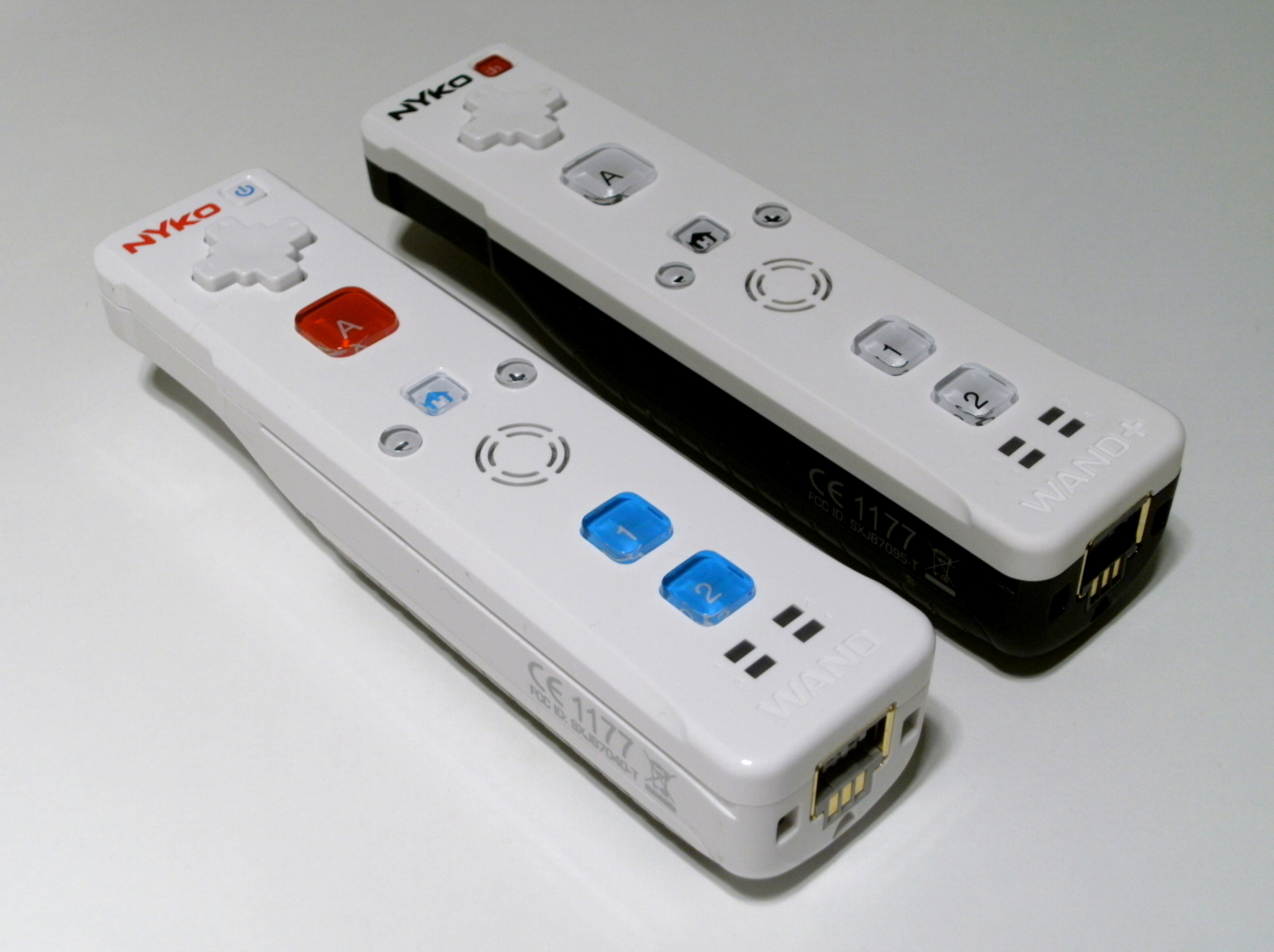
- Nyko Wand and Wand+
- Manufacturer: Nyko
- Type: Motion controller (video game controller)
- Generation: Seventh generation
- Lifespan: Wand: NA: May 21, 2009; Wand+: NA: September 2, 2010
- Sound: Internal speaker
- Input: Digital D-pad; 8 × digital buttons; Infrared optical sensor; Motion sensing
- Connectivity: Bluetooth; Accessory connector port (400 kHz I²C); Trans-Port extension pins
- Power: 2 × AA battery

The Wand is a line of game controllers released by Nyko as third-party alternatives to the official Nintendo Wii Remote. The original Wand duplicated the functionality of the Wii Remote, while the updated Wand+ added internal replication of the Wii MotionPlus for more advanced motion sensing, similar to Nintendo's later Wii Remote Plus. The Wand series also adds additional functionality through the use of a proprietary extension of the standard Wii Remote expansion port.

== Overview ==
The design of the Wand is largely similar to Nintendo's Wii Remote. Like the official controller, it has been made available in multiple colors, and features seven digital buttons and a D-pad on the face, a trigger button on the reverse; an infrared sensor for pointer controls; and motion sensing hardware. The latter was improved in the updated Wand+, which internally replicates the functionality of the Wii MotionPlus.

The Wand expansion port also includes additional pins dubbed "Trans-Port Technology" by their creator, which allow Wand-specific accessories to digitally activate the controller's buttons and receive haptic feedback information, features not available on the Wii Remote.

== History ==
Development on the Wand was first revealed publicly at the January 2009 Consumer Electronics Show (CES), where it was given a CNET Best of CES award in the Gaming category for "[improving] on the original Nintendo Wii remote". Coverage of the device's unveiling noted that the Wand was the first third-party Wii Remote alternative to be developed, and the controller was released to retail on May 21, 2009. At CES 2010, Nyko displayed an updated version of the Wand with integrated MotionPlus support, dubbed the Wand+. At the time of its January unveiling, it was the only Wii controller with internal MotionPlus capability—Nintendo's Wii Remote Plus would not be announced until late in the year—and the Wand+ was nominated by CNET for Best of CES, in addition to being voted among the Best of CES 2010 by the editors of CrunchGear. The Wand+ became available on September 2, 2010.

== Accessories ==
The Wand's design makes it compatible with most standard Wii Remote accessories, including controller shells such as the Wii Wheel and Zapper, and expansion port devices like the Nunchuk and Classic Controller. Released prior to Nintendo's MotionPlus, the Wand was not initially compatible with the accessory, however a firmware update was made available to Wand owners, and future shipments supported the device.

=== Kama ===
The Kama is Nyko's alternative to the official Nunchuk, and can be used with Wands as well as Wii remotes and other alternatives. It is produced in both wireless and wired models. The wireless Kama uses two AAA batteries for power, while the wired version (which is powered via the expansion port) uses this space to include a rumble motor for haptic feedback when used with Wands, via Trans-Port.

=== Pistol Grip ===
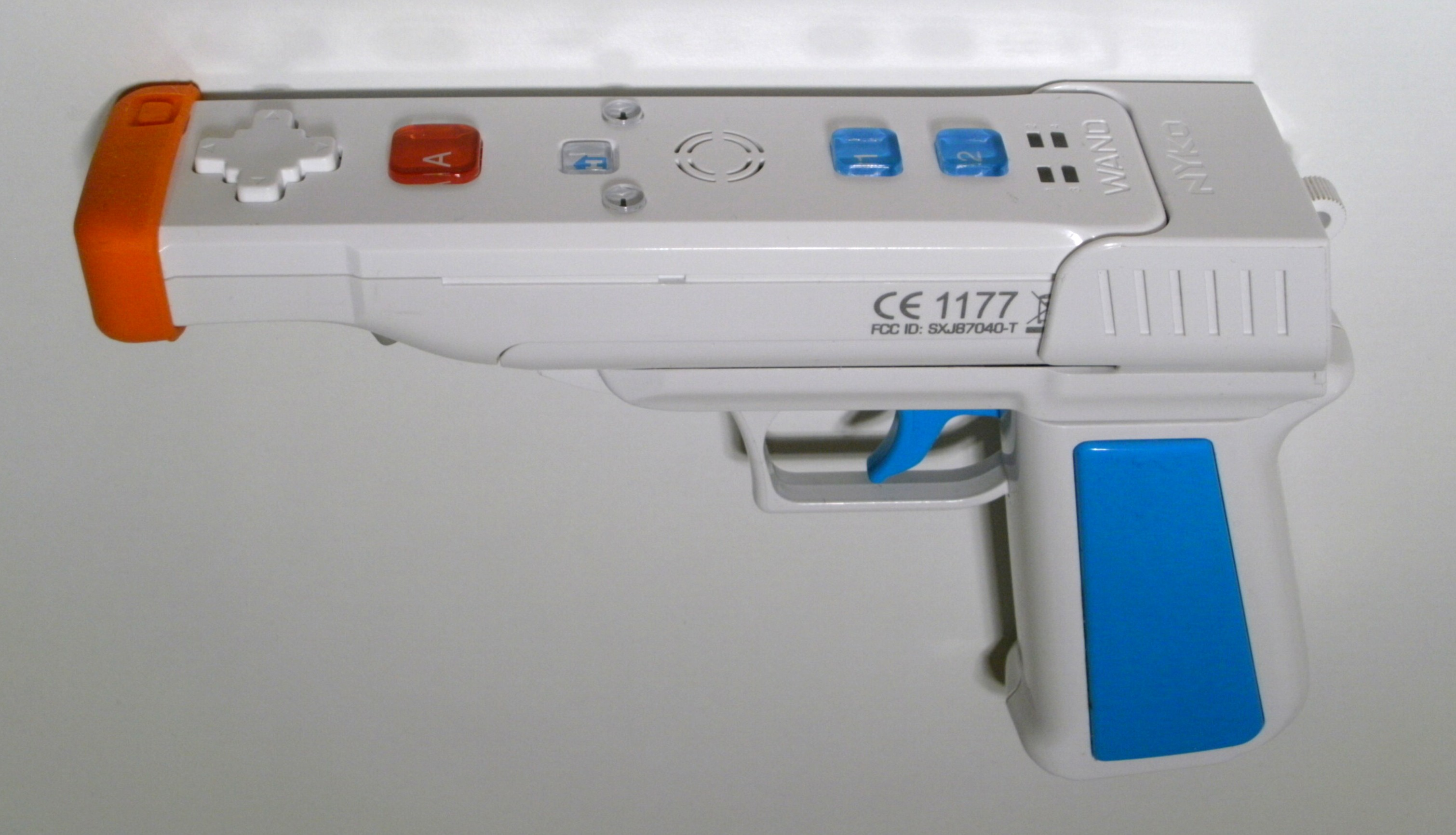
The Wand sits in the Pistol Grip, forming the gun's barrel.

The Pistol Grip is a gun shell for Wands, similar in design to Nyko's (mechanical) Perfect Shot, with digital inputs using Trans-Port. It is intended for use with light gun games, and features digital hammer and trigger buttons mapped to the Wand's A and B buttons, with a switch allowing their functions to be inverted depending on the game's controls. It also includes a rumble motor for haptic feedback, and a pass-through port for attaching other accessories to the Pistol Grip. Due to its reliance on features of the Wand, it is not compatible with other devices.

=== Type Pad Pro ===
The Type Pad Pro is a QWERTY keyboard shell for the Wand and other Wii Remote-compatible devices. It connects wirelessly to the Wii via a USB dongle, and is powered by the remote's expansion port. When used with a Wand, buttons on the Type Pad are able to activate the A and B buttons digitally via Trans-Port.

== Reception ==
Reviews of Wand controllers have been moderate to positive. In their review of the original version, the Wand was described by Destructoid as being "as good as and in some ways superior to the original", with "better" buttons, improved grip and otherwise "identical" functionality, concluding with a "Buy it!" rating. IGN preferred the Wand's buttons to the Wii Remote, noting that "the 1 and 2 buttons are much easier to get a firm grip and mash mercilessly on," the B trigger had "improved tactile response," and their responsiveness was "exceptional", while the Wand's motion controls were comparable with Nintendo's controller. UGO felt the larger buttons were "much more inline with a classic NES controller than the tiny Wii buttons", describing the controller as being superior to the Wii Remote for "more hardcore gamers".

Other reviewers had more mixed feelings on the Wand. Nintendojo said the third-party controller was "a good alternative" but had "a few issues" when used with extension controllers, ultimately rating it a 7.5/10. CNET, while speaking positively about the motion controls, internal speaker and buttons, felt the redesigned D-pad was "clunky and cumbersome", and were disappointed by the lack of Trans-Port accessories at launch, giving it 3/5. Much criticism has been directed at the Wand's aesthetics. Reporting on the device's unveiling at CES, Destructoid called it a "twisted brainwrong" which "looks a bit like it was designed by half-crazed, starving Oompa Loompas on the back of a thirty day coke binge." Joystiq noted that "the defining characteristic of the Nyko Wand is its ugliness."

Reception for the Wand+ in particular has been positive. Engadget felt that including MotionPlus support in a stock-sized controller was "as it should have been in the first place", preferring it over the dongle solution, ending by "shockingly [having] to conclude it is equal to or superior to the stock Wiimote." GeekDad appreciated the use of "a newer, more muted color palette" over the "garish" original Wand, adding that it featured "functionality that the Nintendo product should have rightly delivered from the get-go" and was overall "as responsive as [a] first-party product".
