= Wii Zapper =

Video game accessory

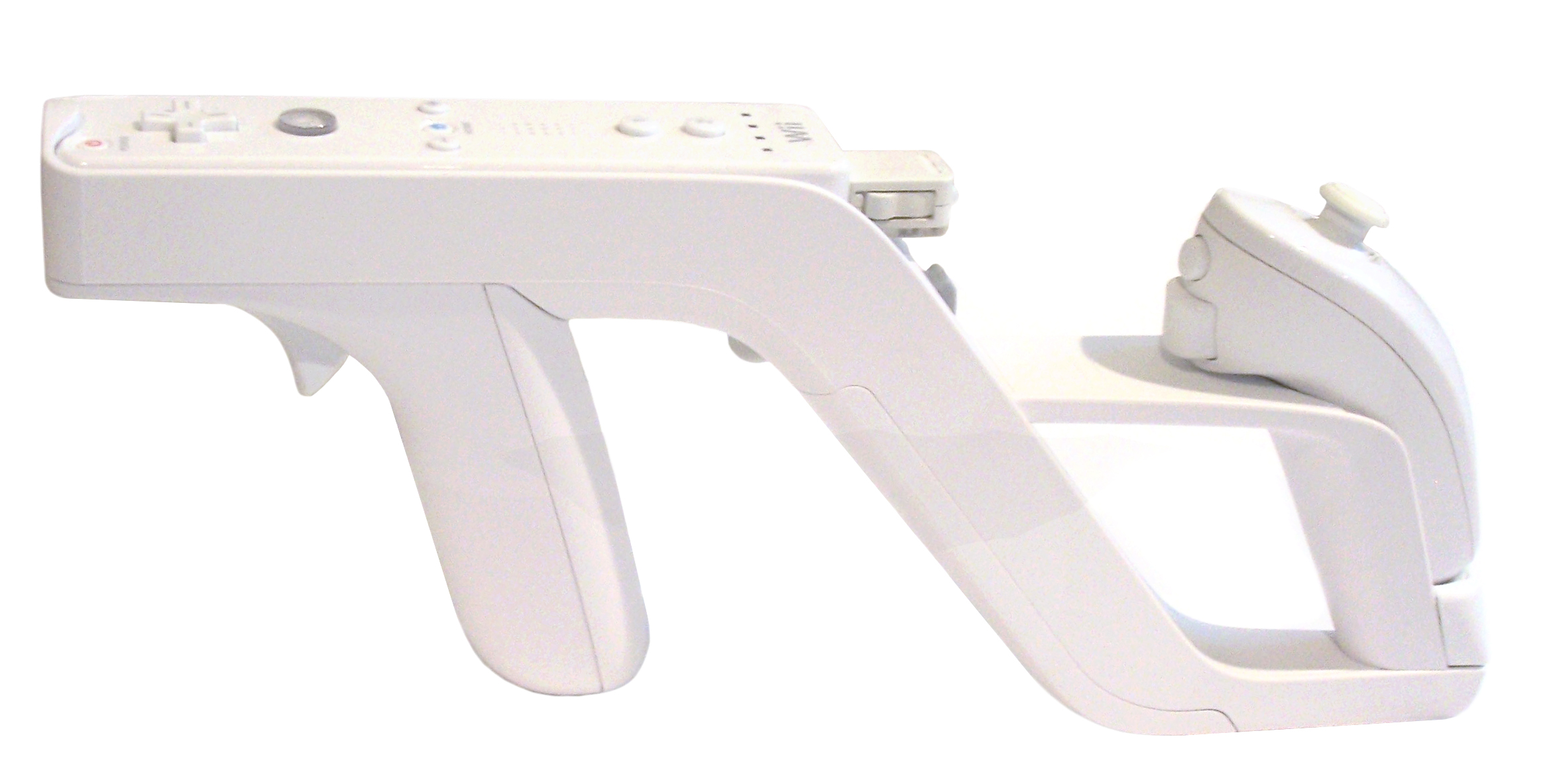
- Wii Zapper with Wii Remote and Nunchuk
- Manufacturer: Nintendo
- Type: Peripheral
- Generation: Seventh
- Released: JP: October 25, 2007; NA: November 19, 2007; EU: December 7, 2007; AU: December 13, 2007
- Discontinued: Yes

The Wii Zapper is a gun shell peripheral for the Wii Remote. The name is a reference to and successor of the NES Zapper light gun for the Nintendo Entertainment System. It is mainly used to enhance controls for shooter games, including light gun shooters, first-person shooters, and third-person shooters.

== History ==
According to an interview with Shigeru Miyamoto, the idea of a Zapper-type expansion formed when the Wii Remote was first created. He expressed, "What we found is that the reason we wanted to have a Zapper is when you hold a Wii Remote, it can be difficult for some people to keep a steady hand. And holding your arm out like that can get your arm somewhat tired."

A staff member of The Legend of Zelda: Twilight Princess's development team later created a makeshift gun-like frame using rubber bands and wires, which held the Wii Remote and Nunchuk together. In response, Miyamoto stated "this isn't the time or the place to be making things like this!". However, when Miyamoto held the prototype in his hands, he found it very comfortable. He proposed it to the hardware developers, who started on the formal development project. The Wii Zapper underwent an extensive development period involving many design phases, including one that produced a rumble whenever the player hit a target. To save battery life, the rumble function was abandoned, provided by just the Wii Remote itself.

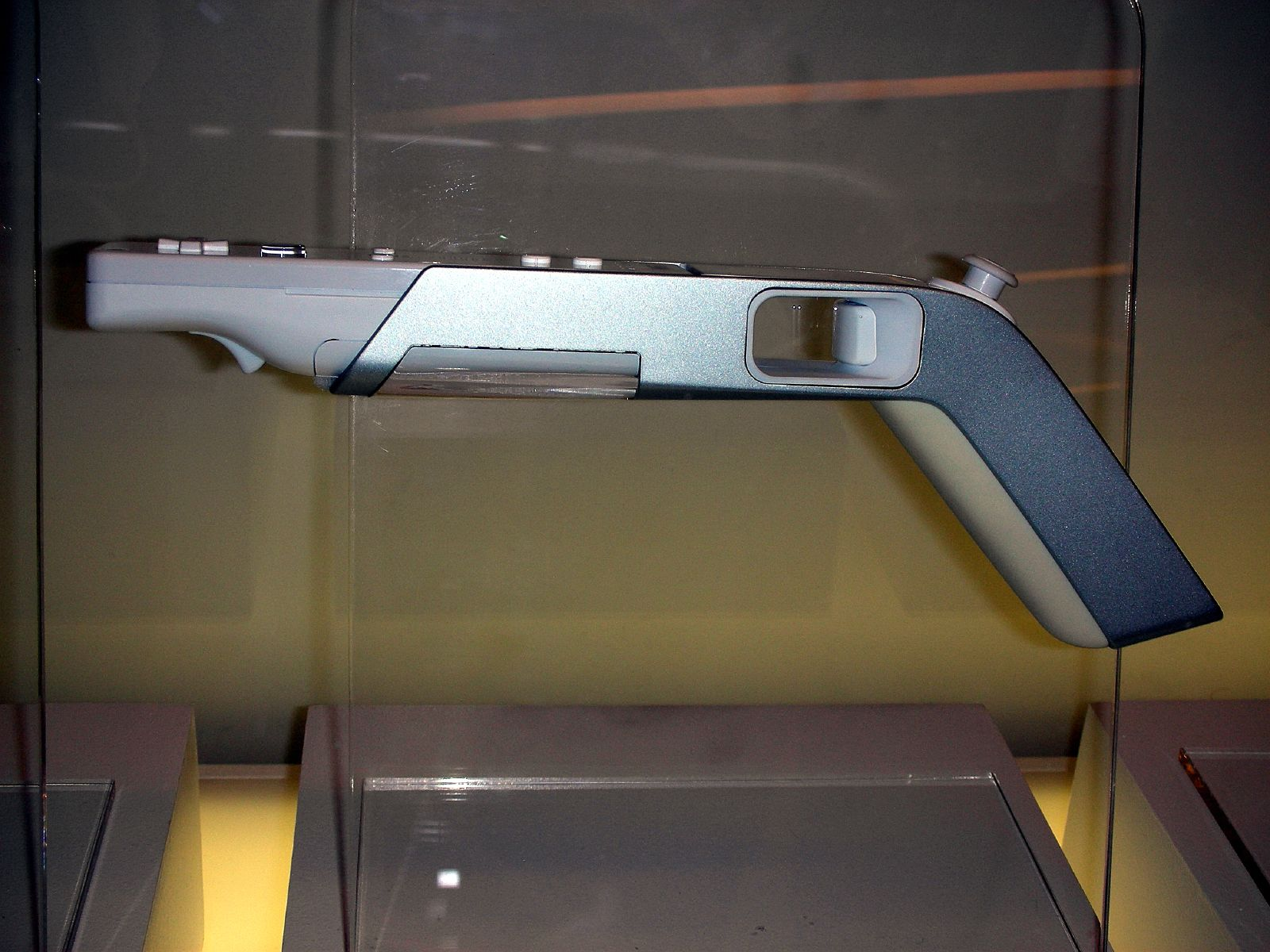
Prototype "Zapper" shown in 2006

A "Zapper" prototype was shown at E3 2006 featuring a shotgun-like design with a "trigger hole", as well as an analog stick built into the top of the handle. This made it similar to the Nunchuk attachment, but without the accelerometer and the C button. In this version, the "gun barrel" of the shell housed the Wii Remote and connected with its expansion port.

A revised design was revealed on July 11, 2007, at E3 2007 with a form reminiscent of a submachine gun, in which the Wii Remote is fitted in the gun barrel and the Nunchuk is cradled in the rear handle. This design came about with the realization that making the Wii Zapper functionally independent from attachments would "allow for more diverse play styles." Some concern has been raised by this arrangement, since most people would naturally end up holding the Nunchuk with their dominant hand and be forced to pull the trigger with their non-dominant hand. Third-party titles designed to support the Wii Zapper include Resident Evil: The Umbrella Chronicles, Ghost Squad, Medal of Honor: Heroes 2, The House of the Dead 2 & 3 Return, The House of the Dead: Overkill, Call of Duty: World at War, Wild West Guns, Quantum of Solace, Call of Duty: Modern Warfare Reflex Edition, Dead Space: Extraction, Resident Evil: The Darkside Chronicles, Heavy Fire: Special Operations, Heavy Fire: Black Arms, Heavy Fire: Afghanistan, Mad Dog McCree: Gunslinger Pack, Gunblade NY (with its sequel L.A. Machineguns: Rage of the Machines included), Target: Terror, GoldenEye 007, Brothers in Arms: Double Time and Call of Duty: Black Ops, while Nintendo has supported it with the first-party WiiWare game, Eco Shooter: Plant 530, as well as with Sin and Punishment: Star Successor. There have also been a few sports games involving shooting, like paintball and biathlon, that support the Wii Zapper, such as Greg Hastings Paintball 2 and RTL Biathlon 2009.

The Wii Zapper was first released in Japan on October 25, 2007, as a pack-in with Ghost Squad, with standalone units also made available for purchase on Nintendo's Japanese online store. A bundle with Umbrella Chronicles was later released in the region on November 15, 2007. For other regions, the Wii Zapper is packaged with Link's Crossbow Training, a training game based on The Legend of Zelda: Twilight Princess. It was released in North America on November 19, 2007, in Europe on December 7, 2007, and in Australia on December 13, 2007.

== Third-party gun accessories ==
Despite an official Wii Zapper expansion released by Nintendo, some gun peripherals were made by third parties.

The first of these appeared in early April 2007, when video game retailer GameStop listed a "Wii Blaster" peripheral on its website, with a release date of May 1, 2007. Originally listed without a specified manufacturer, the Wii Blaster had been speculated to be the Zapper, but has since been indicated to be produced by third party accessories manufacturer Core Gamer. The Wii Blaster eventually released on June 27, 2007.

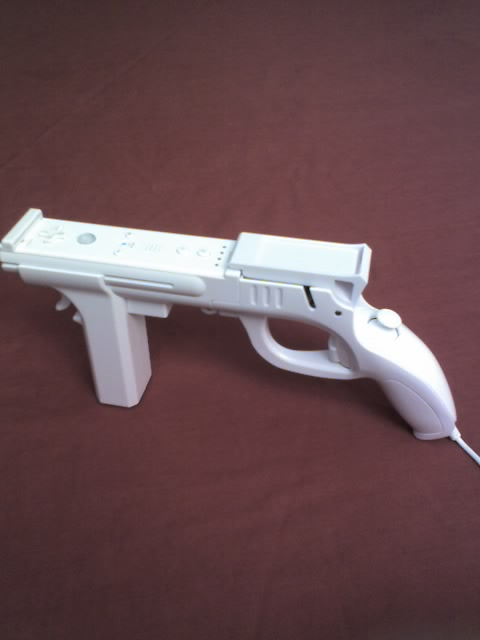
Wii Light Gun

Another variation on the official Wii Zapper is the Wii Light Gun. It is designed much like a sub-machine gun. It was not packaged with any games.

The "Sharp Shooter" an aesthetic gun accessory for the Wii Remote and Nunchuk, was released by third-party manufacturer Joytech. In this accessory, the Wii Remote is housed in the gun barrel, and the Nunchuk is fitted into the handle so that the Nunchuk's buttons serve as gun triggers.

The Perfect Shot was designed by Nyko to be an alternative to the Wii Zapper. It has a pistol-like design that uses only the Wii Remote. Below the Perfect Shot is a slot, where the user can attach the Nunchuk or other Wii Remote add-ons. Nyko also released the Pistol Grip, a gun shell of similar design but only compatible with their Wand Wii Remote alternative, due to its digital inputs using their proprietary expansion port.

Hong Kong–based accessory manufacturer Brando also released two Wii gun shells: one of them is the 2-in-1 combined light gun, that very closely resembles the Nyko Perfect Shot, while the other one, named the Wii Cyber Gun, is more similar to the Zapper.

A Wii Remote-only gun shell was also released with the game Cocoto Magic Circus.

To coincide with the release of the Nerf N-Strike video game, an arcade-style light gun shooter, Hasbro released the N-Strike Switch Shot EX-3, a functional Nerf dart shooter that can be modified by removing the dart shooting mechanism and replacing it with a Wii Remote to allow it to be used as a light gun shell. The Switch Shot is available both in a bundle with the Nerf N-Strike game and as a separate peripheral.

Other gun peripherals include a Wii Crossbow, a Wii Magnum, and a Wii Shotgun. A handcannon shell was also released in PAL regions with The House of the Dead: Overkill, modeled after the AMS pistols used by the main characters in the game. Another shell shaped like a toy laser gun was released alongside Toy Story Mania! in Europe.
