= Tron: Evolution – Battle Grids =

2010 video game

- Developer: n-Space
- Publisher: Disney Interactive Studios
- Series: Tron
- Platforms: Wii; Nintendo DS
- Release: AU: November 25, 2010; EU: November 26, 2010; NA: December 7, 2010
- Genre: Action-adventure
- Modes: Single-player, multiplayer

Tron: Evolution – Battle Grids is a 2010 action-adventure game developed by n-Space and published by Disney Interactive Studios for the Wii and Nintendo DS. It serves as a tie-in to the 2010 film Tron: Legacy, though its storyline predates that of the film and its other tie-in game, Tron: Evolution.

== Gameplay ==
Players create their own playable character known as programs to battle and defeat enemies in Tron: Evolution – Battle Grids. The game allows players to roam around the world of Tron in Grid Tanks, Light Cycles, Recognizers, or on foot for hand-to-hand combat. The game features a story mode which includes many games and some small hubs. In each hub there are programs with jobs, or quests that the player can complete for bits (bits can also be found scattered around the hubs) and use them for further customization to the Players' program. There is a cheat code system for unlocking in-game elements. Up to four players can play at the same time in local multiplayer.

=== Modes ===
- Grid Games features several games for players to play. This mode goes up to 4 players. Grid Games features Light Cycle arena, Light Cycle Races, Disc Arena, Light Runner Arena, Light Runner Races, HyperBall and Tanks.
- Story Mode is the campaign and where players can play the main story of the game. The player will play countless Grid Games to become the Champion of the Grid Games.
- Championship Mode is where players can pick any 4 to 8 Grid Games and play them as rounds in a Grid Championship Game. This mode goes up to 4 players.

The Wii version supports the use of Wii MotionPlus, but only in HyperBall, where it allows players to perform advanced shots when launching and returning the ball. The Light Cycle and Light Runner modes can also be played with the Wii Wheel.

== Plot ==
The game revolves around a Program designed and named by the player, who strives to become the first ISO champion of the eponymous Battle Grid. The story begins with the Program battling Quorra (Olivia Wilde), who finds Zuse (Michael Sheen), who takes them to Tron's palace to find a trainer for the Program. They meet with Tron (Bruce Boxleitner), and he fights the program to see if they are championship material.

The program works their way through the ranks with the help of Quorra, and a coach, Calchas, who is killed by a malevolent competitor, Blaze. The Program then goes to Tron's Palace and tells Tron what occurred. When they both return to Tron City, they find out that Quorra had been kidnapped, by Blaze's henchman Bosh, leading to the program fighting and killing the latter to free her. Then they and Quorra hurry to the final event just in time, which is a Light Cycle battle against Blaze. The program wins, and Kevin Flynn himself gave the trophy to the first ISO champion of the Battle Grid.

== Development ==
Tron: Evolution – Battle Grids was developed by n-Space, whose staff were given full creative control by the license holder, though with input from the film team. They were given early access to the film's script, receiving feedback from the scriptwriters as the story of the game developed. The Wii and Nintendo DS versions of the game were designed as different games than the Tron games on the Xbox 360 and PlayStation 3, with the reasoning being that audiences on Wii and DS typically want a different gaming experience than audiences on those platforms.

== Release ==
The game was released in both NTSC and PAL territories.

=== Championship Edition ===
An exclusive edition of the game was released for Toys R Us called Tron: Evolution – Battle Grids [Championship Edition]. It included the three-wheeled out runner light cycle for use by the player.

== Reception ==
Reception

Aggregate score
Aggregator	Score	
Aggregator	DS	Wii
Metacritic	58/100	59/100

Review scores
Publication	Score	
Publication	DS	Wii
Game Informer	N/A	6/10
NGamer	N/A	63%
Nintendo Power	6.5/10	6.5/10
Nintendo World Report	5/10	6.5/10
Official Nintendo Magazine	N/A	65%

The game received "mixed or average" reviews on both platforms according to the review aggregation website Metacritic.
