= Front man (disambiguation) =

A front man or front woman is the leader of a musical group, and is typically also the lead vocalist.

Front man may also refer to:

- Nyko FrontMan, a guitar controller for game systems
- Front Man (Squid Game), a character in Squid Game
  - "Front Man", the eighth episode of the first season of Squid Game
- "Front Man", an episode of White Collar
- a person in charge of a front organization

== See also ==
- Agent (law), a person authorized to act on behalf of another to create legal relations with a third party
- Foreign agent, anyone who actively carries out the interests of a foreign country while located in another host country
- Straw man (law), a legal owner of a property who has no beneficial interest in the property
