= Academy of Champions: Soccer =

2009 video game

- North American box art
- Developer: Ubisoft Vancouver
- Publisher: Ubisoft
- Platform: Wii
- Release: AU: September 3, 2009; EU: September 4, 2009; NA: November 3, 2009
- Genre: Sports
- Mode: Single-player

Academy of Champions: Soccer (known as Academy of Champions: Football in Europe) is a soccer video game developed by Ubisoft Vancouver and published by Ubisoft for the Wii.

The game features a story mode set at a magical soccer academy, in which the player must build a group of five players to challenge other teams. Academy of Champions features arcade-style soccer, focusing on tricks, shooting, and the whimsical nature of the academy.

== Gameplay ==
Pelé talks to the main character's team in the cartoon art style of the game.

Academy of Champions has a main story mode and a supplemental quick-play mode to allow the user to play a single match by themselves or with a friend. The story mode takes place at Brightfield Academy, a magical soccer academy featuring Pelé and Mia Hamm in cartoon form as the masters of the academy. The player is tasked with putting together a five player soccer team to compete in the academy's soccer league. The user can improve his team by recruiting other players outside of his starting five and by training his players with minigames. Characters from other Ubisoft franchises such as Rayman, Prince of Persia, Raving Rabbids and Assassin's Creed appear as help and opponents to the characters.

The game uses little motion controls; the A and B buttons on the Wii Remote are used to pass and kick, and other actions are handled by the D-pad on the Wii Remote and the controls on the Nunchuk. The minigames are drills in between matches that help the player hone certain skills. One minigame makes use of the Wii Balance Board to dribble around obstacles, and the game features limited Wii MotionPlus support. The quick-play option is limited to two people, and there is no online multiplayer.

== Reception ==
Reception

Aggregate score
| Aggregator | Score |
|---|---|
| Metacritic | 64/100 |

Review scores
| Publication | Score |
|---|---|
| GameSpot | 7/10 |
| GameZone | 7/10 |
| IGN | 7/10 |
| NGamer | 36% |
| Nintendo Life | 6/10 |
| Nintendo Power | 6.5/10 |
| Nintendo World Report | 6/10 |
| PALGN | 7/10 |

Academy of Champions: Soccer received "mixed" reviews according to the review aggregation website Metacritic. GameSpot's Brett Todd criticized the game's lack of online multiplayer, but ultimately noted that the game would entertain its target audience. IGN's Nate Ahearn noted the lack of things to do other than the game's story mode. GameZone's Michael Lafferty praised the charming look of the game, but criticized minor glitches found during the gameplay.
