= Nyko FrontMan =

Guitar controller

The Nyko Frontman is a guitar controller produced by Nyko for several game systems to be used with the video games Guitar Hero and Rock Band. Depending on the version, its appearance is very similar to the Fender Telecaster (Wii) or the Gibson Explorer (PS2/PS3).

== Compatibility ==
Separate models were released for rhythm games for the PlayStation 2, PlayStation 3, Xbox 360 and Nintendo Wii video game consoles. The first iterations were compatible with Guitar Hero 1 and Guitar Hero 2 for the PS2.

Compatibility for Wii, by game title
Game	Compatible?
Guitar Hero III	Yes
Guitar Hero 5	No
Guitar Hero - Aerosmith	Yes
Guitar Hero - World Tour	Yes
Guitar Hero - Van Hallen	Yes
Guitar Hero - Smash Hits	Yes
Guitar Hero - Warriors of Rock	No
Lego Rock Band	Yes
Rock Band	No
Rock Band 2	Yes

With the addition of PS3 Firmware 3.10 the Frontmans Dongle/receiver was Deactivated due to it being one of many products not up to Standards.

== Reception ==
Wired gave the Wii version a 6 out of 10 rating, praising its larger whammy bar and lower price, but feeling that its difference could lead to perceived unfairness in multiplayer competitions. Two separate IGN reviews generally praised it for being better than most other third party guitar controllers, though conceded that it still wasn't better than first party ones. Reviewers at 1UP.com were “impressed” wit it as well, praising its responsiveness.
