= Get Fit with Mel B =

2010 video game

- Australian Xbox 360 cover art
- Developer: Lightning Fish
- Publishers: Deep Silver (US); Black Bean Games (PAL)
- Platforms: PlayStation 3, Wii, Xbox 360
- Release: October 20, 2010: PS3; NA: October 20, 2010; EU: November 26, 2010; AU: December 2, 2010 Xbox 360; AU: October 25, 2010; EU: November 26, 2010 Wii; AU: October 25, 2010; EU: November 26, 2010; NA: September 14, 2011
- Genre: Fitness game
- Mode: Single-player

Get Fit with Mel B is a fitness video game developed by Lightning Fish and released for all three major seventh-generation consoles: the PlayStation 3, Wii and Xbox 360, utilizing each console's advanced motion control accessory (PlayStation Move, Wii MotionPlus and Kinect, respectively) for fitness gameplay.

The game is licensed by Fitness First. A localization of the Xbox 360 version for North America was cancelled, and such a version was only released in the PAL regions.

== Gameplay ==
Get Fit with Mel B is a fitness game and successor to Lightning Fish's NewU Fitness First Personal Trainer (rebranded by Ubisoft as My Fitness Coach 2: Exercise and Nutrition for the US release) and NewU Fitness First Mind Body, Yoga & Pilates Workout with Melanie Brown as the player's fitness coach.

Similar to its predecessors, the player creates a profile based on their weight, height, age, and diet. The daily workouts are generated based on what the player has selected while creating their profile. Players have the option to select individual exercises to perform. A selection of recipes is also included in the game.

Unlike the previous NewU games, the player does not have the option of teachers to choose from and can only be coached by Mel B.

All three versions of the game utilize advanced motion controller accessories, which are mandatory in the two non-Wii versions due to their native controllers not being designed for full-body motion control. In addition to providing optional compatibility with the Wii MotionPlus, the Wii version also supports the Wii Balance Board.
