= Sports Connection =

2012 video game

- Developers: Ubisoft Barcelona; Longtail Studios
- Publisher: Ubisoft
- Platform: Wii U
- Release: NA: November 18, 2012; EU: November 30, 2012; AU: November 30, 2012; JP: December 20, 2012
- Genre: Sports
- Modes: Single-player, multiplayer

Sports Connection, known in North America as ESPN Sports Connection, is a sports video game published by Ubisoft. It was released as a launch title for the Wii U in North America and Europe.

The game was first revealed in Nintendo's press conference on June 5 during E3 2012. The reveal occurred alongside a lineup of other Ubisoft published Wii U games including Assassin's Creed III, Rabbids Land, Your Shape: Fitness Evolved 2013, Rayman Legends, and Marvel Avengers: Battle for Earth. On September 13, 2012, the American title was officially changed to ESPN Sports Connection after the licensing rights were given by ESPN. In the game, characters can wear clothing and accessories with the ESPN branding, along with logos from other ESPN-related networks. Original music compositions for ESPN were incorporated as the themes for in-game arrangements.

== Gameplay ==
Sports Connection features 6 Sports including Tennis, Golf, Baseball, Soccer, Karting, and Football. Each sport contains a version of the ESPN sport with traditional rules and one additional side mode. For each of the sports, the duration of the game, location, and computer difficulty are customizable. The game is compatible with the Wii U GamePad and Wii MotionPlus Remote, with some sports requiring the player to switch between both control methods. Upon first playing the game, the player creates an avatar for themselves. Achievements can also be received by completing specific tasks in each of the sports.

In Tennis, the player can compete in a Match with the standard Tennis rules. Additionally, the Cannon Ball mode features a cannonball which requires the player to return a serve to an outlined spot on the court.

In Golf, the game is played exclusively with the Wii Remote. The player can practice their swing and hold the B button to swing the golf club. Additionally, the golf ball can be applied with spin and the position can be adjusted. Golf is the only sport with no computer players to compete against. The Caddie mode has the player as a caddie, directing the golfer where to shoot the ball, requiring both controller methods.

In Baseball, the Wii Remote motion controls are used to hit the ball while the GamePad is used to pitch with the stylus. When in the outfield, the ball can be caught by holding the touchscreen and pointing the GamePad in the direction the ball is descending from. This mode features options for an Exhibition match and a Tournament, with the Tournament being the only mode that does not support multiple players.

In Soccer, the player can shoot, pass, and sprint with the ball or sprint and tackle the opposing team when defending. All these actions are performed with buttons, as the touchscreen can be used to kick a penalty shot in the Penalty Shootout mode. When using a Wii Remote, the game uses pointer and motion controls to kick a penalty.

In Football, 2 teams of 6 athletes compete against each other in an Exhibition. When on offense, the player switches to the Wii Remote to select their play, grab the football, aim and throw the football to their teammates. When on defense, the player switches to the GamePad to move their players and tackle the opponent with the touchscreen. Similarly to Baseball, this mode features options for an Exhibition and Tournament.

In Karting, the player can race on over 11 unique tracks. A boost meter is filled up by performing drifts around the track and can be used for a short speed boost. Time Trials are available as a separate mode to keep track of the personal best racing records. The steering can be switched between motion and button controls during gameplay. In promotion and advertising, the Wii Wheel is shown to be compatible with this sport.

== Reception ==
Sports Connection

Aggregate score
Aggregator	Score
Metacritic	31/100

Review scores
Publication	Score
GamesMaster	40/100
IGN	3/10
Nintendo Life	4/10 stars
Nintendo World Report	2.5/10
Official Nintendo Magazine	18%

The game received "generally unfavorable" reviews according to the review aggregator website Metacritic.

The Official Nintendo Magazine called it a "joyless, inept, tedious, ugly, lazy, messy waste of your time and money". They state the sports are poorly made with slowdown, embarrassingly easy computer opponents, and dull gameplay. Golf is credited as the best mode since it copies the mechanics of Wii Sports Golf, but Football is credited as the worst sport because of the movement. The magazine ends the review by exclaiming "We hoped games this bad might die out with the Wii", giving their final verdict and rating of 18%.

In addition to the low rating, the Official Nintendo Magazine ranked Sports Connection as the third worst Wii U game in 2013. This placed it above Game Party Champions and Family Party: 30 Great Games - Obstacle Arcade which ranked second and first place.

Mitch Dyer from IGN rated Sports Connection a 3/10, since the game contained 6 shallow sports that are all treated like minigames. The frequent switching between controllers bothers him, and controls are not taking advantage of either the accuracy from Wii MotionPlus or the newly introduced features on the GamePad. The tolerable sports have at least one major issue, with Baseball and Football the absolute worst in the package according to Dyer.

Nintendo World Report rated Sports Connection a 2.5/10, since the game contains an uninteresting collection of sports, claiming Baseball is the best sport, even if the controls are unresponsive. The author Zack Kaplan states "Unresponsive is the Name of this Game". Trevor Houston rated the game 27/100, stating ESPN Sports Connection was the most disappointing Wii U launch title.

Nintendo Life rated the game a 4/10, giving some credit to the achievements and competence of the playable sports. Jon Wahlgreen claims the visuals are not ascetically pleasing, the controls are not compelling, and the sports are lazily cobbled together, ultimately suggesting Nintendo Land as the better launch game.

Ken McKown from ZTGD calls the game "Lacking in almost every way" comparing it to Wii Sports without the aspects that made Wii Sports enjoyable. Ken reviews each of the 6 sports with their own dedicated headers, favoring Baseball and the Kart Racing sports. The other sports are characterized as mediocre and non offensive with frustrating controls on occasion. He gives Sports Connection a final rating of 35/100.

The French media website Jeux Actu rated the game a 4/20, citing many negative elements with Tennis as the only positive. Certain negatives include the lackluster visuals, long loading times, lag, the price, and the required use of Wii MotionPlus.
