= Link's Crossbow Training =

2007 video game

- North American and PAL region cover art
- Developer: Nintendo EAD
- Publisher: Nintendo
- Director: Makoto Miyanaga
- Producers: Eiji Aonuma; Takashi Tezuka
- Composers: Kenta Nagata; Toru Minegishi
- Series: The Legend of Zelda
- Platform: Wii
- Release: NA: November 19, 2007; EU: December 7, 2007; AU: December 13, 2007; JP: May 1, 2008
- Genre: Shooter
- Modes: Single-player, multiplayer

Link's Crossbow Training (Note: Known in Japan as Link's Bowgun Training (Japanese: リンクのボウガントレーニング, Hepburn: Rinku no Bōgan Torēningu)) is a 2007 shooting video game developed and published by Nintendo for the Wii. It was bundled with the Wii Zapper peripheral and was the first game to use it. The game was released worldwide in 2007, and in Japan in May 2008. It uses several environments, enemies, and other assets from The Legend of Zelda: Twilight Princess as stages for targets with various shootable background objects. It received mixed reviews.

== Gameplay ==
Link's Crossbow Training is set in a world in the style of The Legend of Zelda: Twilight Princess, and in the game the player assumes the role of the protagonist of The Legend of Zelda series, Link. To perfect Link's crossbow marksmanship, the player must pass a series of tests, starting with stationary bullseye targets, before moving onto moving targets and actual enemies. After every level, the player gets a medal depending upon their score. The types of medals range from bronze to platinum.

Link's Crossbow Training features 9 playable levels, and the goal in each is to achieve the highest score possible within the time limit. These levels are divided into three main gameplay styles.

- In Target Shooting levels, players fire their crossbow at targets, which start stationary, but move as the difficulty increases in later levels. Hitting the center of the bullseye earns more points, and the points earned multiplies if the player hits subsequent targets without missing.
- In Defender levels, players remain stationary, while retaining the ability to shoot and aim through 360°. Here, Link must fight off hordes of enemies, including Stalfos in a desert-themed level, and defending a wagon from boar-riding Bokoblins. If Link takes damage the player's score will decrease.
- In Ranger levels, the player assumes complete control over Link (via the control stick on the Nunchuk), in levels including a siege on an enemy encampment, and fighting through a forest.

In some levels, Link battles bosses, most of them having weak spots that the player must hit. Link's Crossbow Training has a multiplayer mode, where players take turns competing for the highest score.

== Development ==
Link's Crossbow Training was produced by Shigeru Miyamoto, Eiji Aonuma and Takashi Tezuka. The idea of a first-person The Legend of Zelda game started with Ocarina of Time (1998), which Miyamoto wanted to develop in the first person; however, the inclusion of a child Link got in the way of this idea. Miyamoto also created the game to show Japanese gamers how fun the genre can be by bridging the gap between simple scrolling shooters and advanced shooters. It was also made with the intent of being a side-story to Twilight Princess (2006), and make use of its vast overworld.

The development staff began work on the game's story, which Miyamoto intended to be an extra story based around Twilight Princess, but the staff had been coming up with what could be better described as "epic tales" rather than "side stories". When Miyamoto revealed that he would not make the game with an "epic tale", much of the staff was shocked, saying it was like killing all of the ideas they had been working with until then. Some argued that they should not even do it, as it would be simply reusing existing software and selling it to the consumers. Miyamoto proposed that they make a working prototype and have test players give impressions of the game. If they did not like it, Miyamoto would stop development right there. Nintendo of America gathered together several die-hard The Legend of Zelda fans, who all reacted positively to the game. Reports from these test players were given to the development team daily, allowing them to tweak the game as they went along.

Miyamoto created a list of "do nots" for the development team, including not incorporating anything unnecessary, not "making a movie", and making sure a player could be able to complete a stage within three minutes, so as to not discourage the player from trying to beat the level again if they fail. Miyamoto also told the developers to not get caught up in the rewards, letting the players focus on the "journey" first, and to not include any boss battles so the developers could focus on making the whole game entertaining rather than focusing on making bosses. Miyamoto eventually gave in after the developers insisted on there being three bosses in the game, although he reduced that to one to make them focus on making one "fabulous" boss battle instead of attempting to make three boss battles.

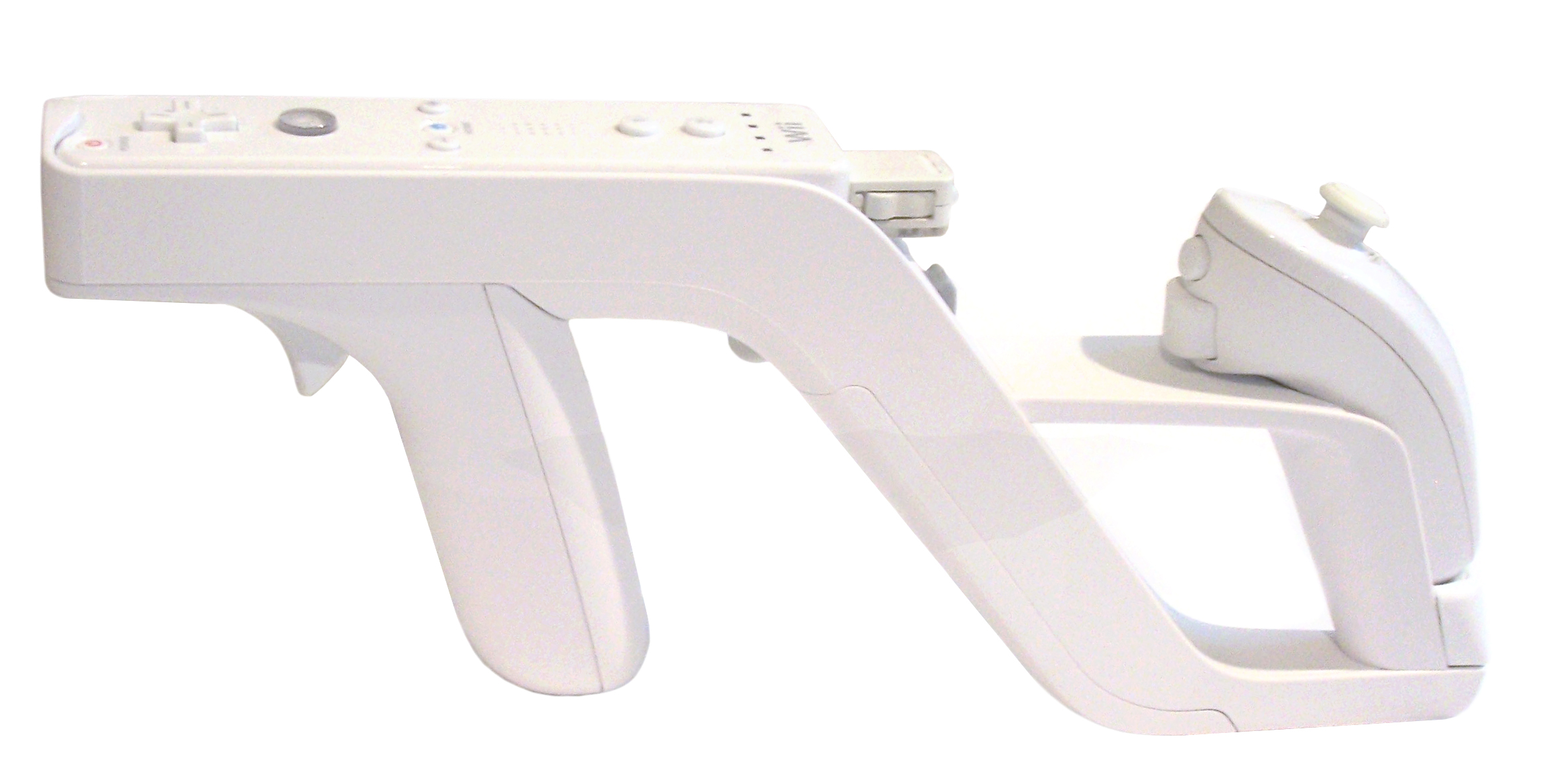
The game was bundled with the Wii Zapper and was the first game to use peripheral.

Choosing which game to use the Wii Zapper with proved to be difficult. Because the project was due to the ideas of The Legend of Zelda staff, Miyamoto wanted it to be in The Legend of Zelda universe, although some staff argued that giving Link a gun would be too strange. Miyamoto proposed a Terminator-style plot about a time warp to the future, but the idea was vetoed immediately. Miyamoto enjoyed the Hidden Village from Twilight Princess's spaghetti western theme, and recreated it so people could enjoy it in an FPS setting. He also thought using the Wii Zapper in a western theme would make it even more fun. The development team eventually settled for giving Link a crossbow. Despite crossbows being unable to do a rapid-fire effect, Miyamoto felt that because it is just for fun, they did it anyway.

The game was originally titled Introduction to Wii Zapper, but the development team opted to change this, to avoid confusion with Introduction to Wii, the Japanese title of Wii Play (2007). The team also did not want to call it something like The Legend of Zelda: Phantom Crossbow, as it would appear to be a grand-scaled sequel in The Legend of Zelda series, and they did not want it to be interpreted as such. They settled for Link's Crossbow Training in the end. Nintendo revealed during its E3 2007 media briefing that a new game would be bundled with the Wii Zapper accessory. This was not announced until the GameStop Expo in September that Link's Crossbow Training was that game, while Nintendo officially confirmed it on September 10.

== Reception ==
Reception

Aggregate scores
Aggregator	Score
GameRankings	69.26% (37 reviews)
Metacritic	68% (34 reviews)

Review scores
Publication	Score
Eurogamer	5/10
GameSpy	4/5
IGN	7/10
Nintendo Power	6.5/10

Reviews were generally mixed. Nintendo Power praised the game and its potential of the zapper, but they criticized it for being too short. IGN stated that the game was enjoyable, but agreed that it was too short. IGN's review also panned the Wii Zapper as actually "making the game more difficult" to play and generally frustrating to use.

=== Sales ===
By July 2008, the game had sold 194,849 copies in Japan. By September, the game had sold 2.75 million copies worldwide. It was the 16th best-selling game and seventh best-selling Wii game of December 2008 in the United States. It was in the Top 10 on the best-selling Wii games list for nearly two years until being surpassed by Wii Sports Resort, Wii Fit Plus, and later New Super Mario Bros. Wii.
