= Tiger Woods PGA Tour 10 =

2009 video game

- Developers: EA Tiburon; HB Studios (PS2, PSP)
- Publisher: EA Sports
- Series: PGA Tour
- Platforms: PlayStation 2, PlayStation 3, PlayStation Portable, Wii, Xbox 360
- Release: NA: June 8, 2009; AU: July 2, 2009; EU: July 3, 2009
- Genre: Sports
- Modes: Single-player, multiplayer

Tiger Woods PGA Tour 10 is a sports video game developed by EA Tiburon for the PlayStation 3, Wii and Xbox 360 versions and HB Studios for the PlayStation 2 and PlayStation Portable versions and published by EA Sports for PlayStation 2, PlayStation 3, PlayStation Portable, Wii and Xbox 360.

The servers that supported the online mode for this game, and many others, were permanently shut down by the publishers on August 11, 2011. Users who attempt to log on see a message that says "The EA servers are not available at this time. Please try again later."

== Features ==
A player (playing as Tiger Woods) attempting a putt in the game.

Tiger Woods PGA Tour 10 features the U.S. Open, the USGA Championship and the USGA's Rules of Golf for the first time in the franchise's history. The Weather Channel (Forecast Channel on the Wii) provides dynamic weather data for the game. The new "Tournament Challenge" mode allows players to replicate famous shots and moments from the PGA Tour's history.

There are several new courses available for this version of the game, including Bethpage Black, Pinehurst (Course 2), Torrey Pines, Oakmont, Hazeltine National, Banff Springs, and Turnberry, with all listed courses having hosted major championships before. There are many well-known golfers featured in the game, as well as fictitious golfers.

The Wii version of the game features support for the Wii MotionPlus, allowing for a more authentic sports motion to the golf swing, including the ability to draw and fade. In Europe and North America, the Wii version was available in a bundle with a Wii MotionPlus accessory for limited time at launch. Along with the use of the Wii MotionPlus there is a new Disc Golf option in the game.

== Reception ==
Reception

Aggregate score
Aggregator	Score			
Aggregator	PS3	PSP	Wii	Xbox 360
Metacritic	81/100	70/100	88/100	80/100

Review scores
Publication	Score			
Publication	PS3	PSP	Wii	Xbox 360
Destructoid	N/A	N/A	9/10	N/A
Eurogamer	N/A	N/A	N/A	7/10
Game Informer	N/A	N/A	8.5/10	N/A
GamePro	4.5/5	N/A	N/A	4.5/5
GameRevolution	B	N/A	N/A	B
GameSpot	8/10	N/A	9/10	8/10
GameSpy	4/5	N/A	N/A	4/5
GameTrailers	7.9/10	N/A	9/10	7.9/10
GameZone	8.5/10	N/A	8.5/10	8.5/10
IGN	8.3/10	8.1/10	9/10	N/A
Nintendo Power	N/A	N/A	9/10	N/A
Official Xbox Magazine (US)	N/A	N/A	N/A	8/10
PlayStation: The Official Magazine	3.5/5	N/A	N/A	N/A
The Daily Telegraph	N/A	N/A	8/10	N/A

Tiger Woods PGA Tour 10 received "mixed or average" and "generally favorable" reviews, according to review aggregator Metacritic.

Many critics praised the PlayStation 3, Wii and Xbox 360 versions for impressive graphics and smart gameplay. The experience and upgrade system, however, led Tycho of Penny Arcade to say "Tournaments that don't normalize player statistics aren't skill competitions... they're time competitions, measuring not the quality of your leisure hours but the volume", and Gabe, "You can not compete unless you put the time in."

During the 13th Annual Interactive Achievement Awards, the Academy of Interactive Arts & Sciences nominated Tiger Woods PGA Tour 10 for "Sports Game of the Year".

According to NPD for the month of June, Tiger Woods PGA Tour 10 for Wii sold 272,400 units in North America, outselling Wii Fit in its debut month, putting it in fourth place for the month in overall sales. The game did not make the top 10 positions for other platforms according to NPD June sales.
