= C. C. Swiney =

American actor, writer and musician

C.C. Swiney
- Born: Christopher Casey Swiney; August 13, 1981 (age 44); Big Stone Gap, Virginia, U.S.
- Years active: unknown - present

Christopher Casey "C.C." Swiney (born August 13, 1981) is a writer, actor and comedian in the film and television industry.

He was born in Big Stone Gap, Virginia, to Joyce and Tate Swiney.

Swiney attended Powell Valley High School and received his bachelor's degree from Carson-Newman College. He completed his master's degree at the University of Arkansas at Fayetteville.

He got his start at 3-Ball productions as he became a film logger for the television series Dear Santa, Taradise, Medical Miracles and The Biggest Loser. He was quickly promoted to a Story Producer for Mentorn Productions and Fox Reality.

As an actor, Swiney has been in over 100 live theater productions and was a principal character in a movie with Wet City Productions titled, "Urbana", written and directed by Joshua Aaron Weinstein. Currently, Swiney is managed by his wife, Stephanie Dozier. He is a professional stand-up comedian and actor. He also works as Director of Operations at Nyko.

Recently, he helped produce the documentary Great American Race Test. He also writes for the television series Work Out.

He was a quarter finalist in the 1999 National Forensic Association Tournament.
