= Nyko =

American third-party accessories manufacturer

- Founded: 1996
- Headquarters: Los Angeles, California, United States
- Key people: Herschel Naghi; (CEO); Ron Klingbeil; (Finance Director); Tyler Beckman; (Manager of Product Development); C. C. Swiney; (DOO)
- Products: Video game accessories
- Website: http://www.nyko.com

Nyko is an American manufacturer of third-party accessories for various gaming consoles.

== Notable products ==
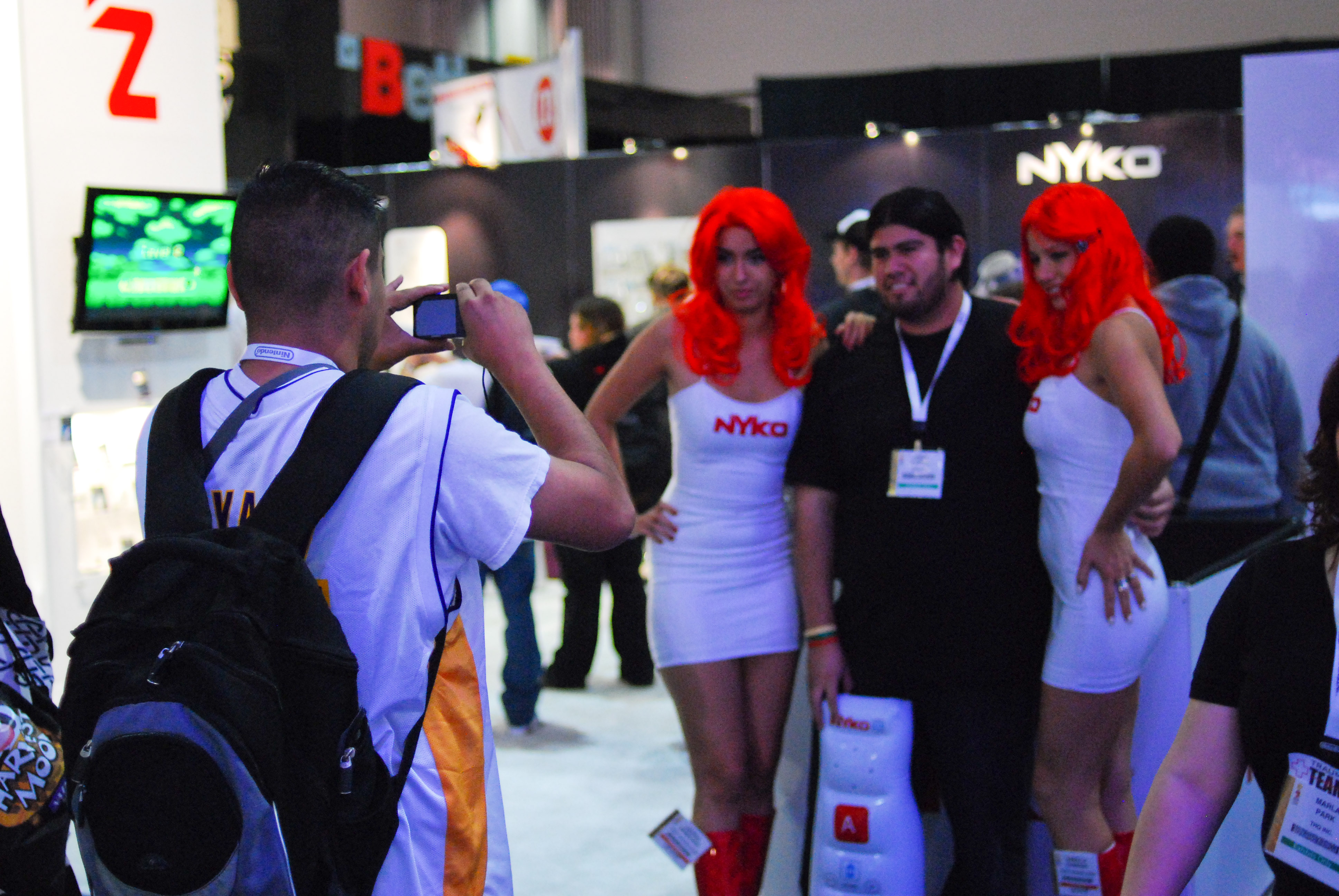
Nyko booth at E3 2009

=== Air Flo ===
In 2002, Nyko introduced its Air Flo line of anti-sweat gaming controllers, which feature built-in fans to prevent sweaty palms. The Air Flo line was initially produced for GameCube, PlayStation 2 (PS2), and Xbox. A console-style controller for PCs was released in 2003. The Air Flo EX, a redesigned PS2 controller with better air flow, was also introduced that year.

A wireless PS2 Air Flo controller, using AA batteries, was released in 2004. That year, Nyko also released wireless Air Flo controllers for the GameCube and Xbox, and produced an Air Flo computer mouse as well. A new EX controller was released for PC and Macintosh in 2005.

=== Wand ===
The Nyko Wand is a third-party replacement for the Wii Remote. It was announced at CES 2009. The Wand features Trans-Port technology, which allows specially designed attachments to pass through key buttons to the attachment, allowing for more responsive attachments. It was chosen for CNET's Best of CES award in the gaming category. Older models are not compatible with Wii MotionPlus but can be sent to Nyko for a firmware update free of charge. At CES 2010, Nyko unveiled the Nyko Wand+ as a new member of the Wand family that added full Wii MotionPlus support with a built in sensor.

=== Kama ===
The Nyko Kama is a wireless controller accessory created for the Wii created by Nyko. Like the original Nunchuk, the Kama features an analog control stick, and "Z" and "C" buttons. The Kama is available in two versions, wired and wireless. The wired version connects to the Wii Remote by its cord, while the wireless version uses two AAA batteries and an adapter dongle that plugs into the back of the Wii Remote.

=== Charge Station ===
The Nyko Charge Station for Wii is a rechargeable battery set and charging stand that allows Wii players to replace the Alkaline AA batteries with a rechargeable NiMH battery pack. The product has spawned numerous knockoffs and copies since its release. Nyko also offers Charge Station rechargeable batteries for the Xbox 360 and PlayStation 3.

=== WormCam ===
The Nyko WormCam is a digital camera attachment for the Game Boy Advance.

=== Zoom for Kinect ===
This is an attachment to Xbox 360's Kinect device. This device zooms in the Kinect camera reducing the space requirement by 40%. It does not require any power or complex installation. The device was unveiled at Electronic Entertainment Expo 2011. It was released on September 13, 2011.

=== Intercooler ===
In 2006, Nyko introduced the Intercooler 360. It is designed to reduce the internal operating temperature of the Xbox 360 and as a result, to prolong lifespan of the console. It connects to the exterior of the console, with no internal modification required. A pass through power connection utilizes the existing Xbox 360 power supply, negating the need for an extra AC adapter. The unit also powers on and off automatically with the system and the Intercooler's small size fit in tight spaces like entertainment centers with the 360 placed in either horizontal or vertical orientation.

Many consumers, as well as the press, claim it scorches their consoles, "steals" power from the system, and even causes the Red Ring of Death, which the device may have been used to avoid. However, Nyko later released the Intercooler EX which has a new AC adaptor made of metal and therefore solves the problem with power "stealing", scorching of the console, and the plug falling off. This was unveiled at E3 2008.

Other Intercooler products have since been released for PlayStation 3, PlayStation 4, and Xbox One.
