= Wii MotionPlus =

Expansion device for the Wii Remote

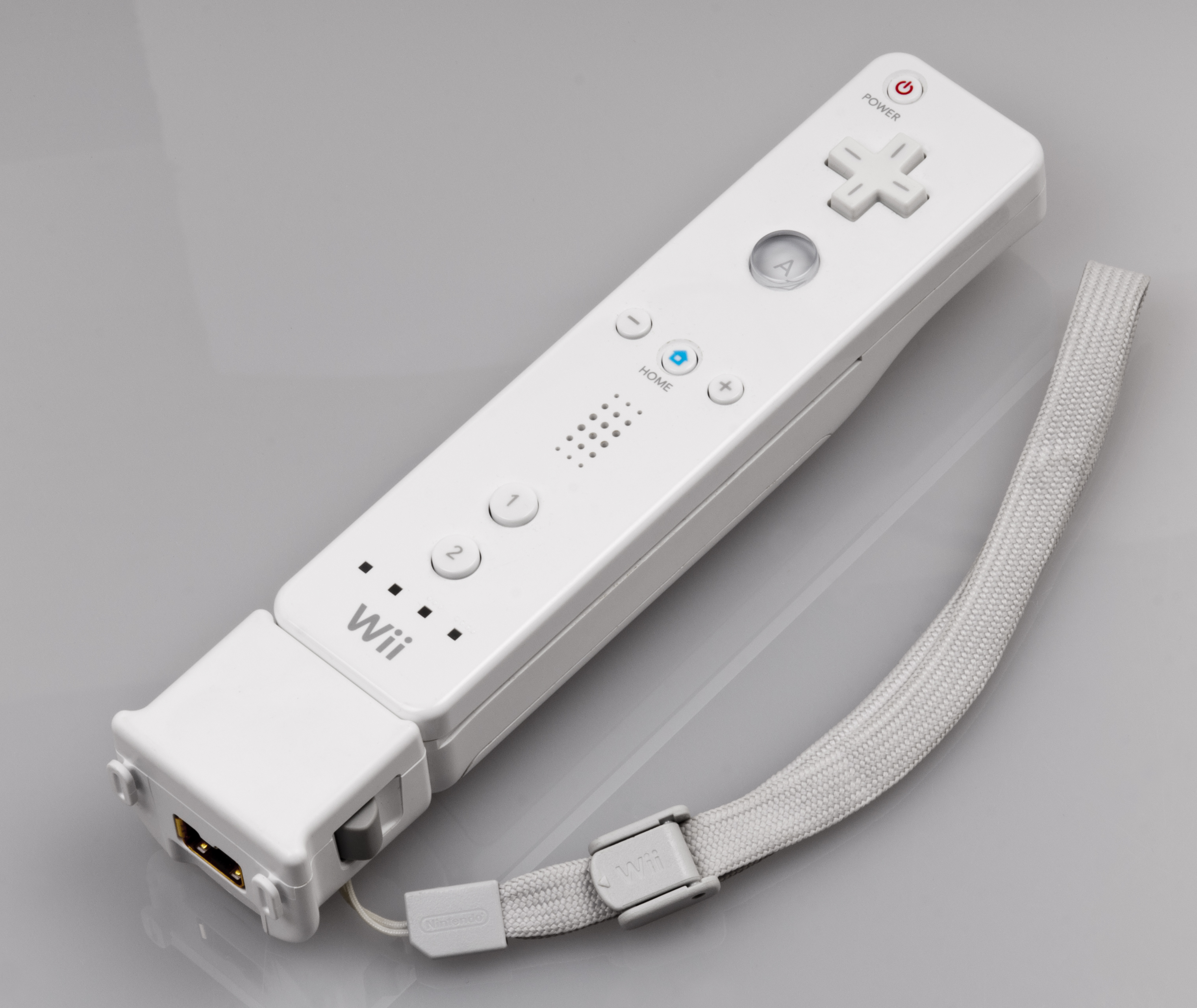
- Wii MotionPlus attached to the Wii Remote (without the included safety jacket)
- Developer: Nintendo IRD
- Manufacturer: Nintendo
- Type: Expansion device
- Generation: Seventh
- Released: NA: June 8, 2009; EU: June 12, 2009; JP: June 25, 2009
- Connectivity: External extension connector
- Successor: Wii Remote Plus

The Wii MotionPlus (Wiiモーションプラス) is an expansion device for the Wii Remote, the primary game controller for the Wii. The device allows more complex motion to be interpreted than the Wii Remote can do alone. Both the Wii and its successor, the Wii U, support the Wii MotionPlus accessory in games.

The accessory was first released in June 2009. A later hardware revision of the Wii Remote, the Wii Remote Plus, was later released with the Wii MotionPlus technology built-in.

== History ==
The Wii MotionPlus was announced by Nintendo in a press release on July 14, 2008, and revealed the next day at a press conference at the E3 Media & Business Summit. It was released in June 2009. On May 3, 2010, Nintendo announced that starting May 9, 2010, the company would include its Wii Sports Resort game and MotionPlus controller with new consoles with no price increase.

=== Development ===
The Wii MotionPlus was developed by Nintendo in collaboration with game development tool company AiLive. The sensor used is an InvenSense IDG-600 or IDG-650 in later units, designed in accordance to Nintendo's specification; with a high dynamic range, high mechanical shock tolerance, high temperature and humidity resistance, and small physical size.

The Wii MotionPlus was conceived soon after the completion of the initial Wii Remote design, to address developer demand for more capable motion sensing, but was only announced after the sensors could be purchased in sufficient volume at a reasonable price. During a developer round table discussion at E3 2008, Wii Sports Resort producer Katsuya Eguchi discussed the potential influence of the Wii MotionPlus on the Wii's existing market, stating that Nintendo was looking at whether the MotionPlus capability will be built into the Wii Remote in the future, or kept "as an attachment we only use for certain software." Nintendo ultimately chose the former by releasing the Wii Remote Plus in late 2010.

=== Colors and variants ===
From June to August 2009, Club Nintendo in Japan held a contest wherein members who purchased and registered a copy of Wii Sports Resort would be entered into a draw to win a sky blue Wii MotionPlus in one of 5,000 blue controller sets. In November 2009, a black Wii MotionPlus was released to coincide with the release of the black Wii console. Bundles containing a black Wii Remote and MotionPlus attachment were also released. In North America, non-white Wii Remotes are bundled with a MotionPlus of matching color for black Wii Remotes and a white MotionPlus unit with a translucent jacket for blue and pink Wii Remotes. In a 2010 Nintendo Conference, the Wii Remote Plus was announced, which places the function of the MotionPlus into a regular sized Wii Remote. It would be the same as the Wii Remote, but the curved text "Wii MotionPlus INSIDE" is added below the Wii logo.

== Technology and features ==
The device incorporates a dual-axis tuning fork gyroscope, and a single-axis gyroscope which can determine rotational motion. The information captured by the angular rate sensor can then be used to distinguish true linear motion from the accelerometer readings. This allows for the capture of more complex movements than possible with the Wii Remote alone. To ensure that it functions properly, the MotionPlus can be calibrated before or during gameplay by placing the Wii Remote facedown (so that the B Button is facing up) on a flat surface and keeping it motionless for at most 10 seconds until an on-screen notification indicates that calibration is complete.

The Wii MotionPlus features a pass-through External Extension Connector, allowing other expansions such as the Nunchuk or Classic Controller to be used simultaneously with the device. Because the Wii MotionPlus extends the length of the Wii Remote, making it impossible to clip the Nunchuk's connector hook to the wrist strap, the MotionPlus dongle features a tethered socket cap that can be snapped onto the connector hook to secure it from abrupt movement should it be forcibly disconnected. The attachment has a color-coded mechanical slide switch for locking the clip release. When attached to the (original, non-MotionPlus) Wii Remote, the add-on unit extends the length of the controller body by approximately 1.5 in (4 cm). Each Wii MotionPlus includes a longer version of the Wii Remote Jacket to accommodate the added length, and according to Nintendo, the Wii MotionPlus is unsafe to use without it. However, the newer Wii Remote Plus eliminates the need for such elongated jackets by integrating the MotionPlus technology into the Remote itself.

The device is only used by games that have been specifically developed to use its functionality. The title screens of these games also provide an option to access a series of instructional videos created by Nintendo to help players learn how to attach and remove the accessory, recalibrate it, connect external controllers to it or otherwise disconnect them. It can remain attached to the Wii Remote when playing games that do not support it without causing any problems, but it will not enhance gameplay. The add-on version of the device is incompatible with any Wii Remote accessories that snugly encase the Remote itself, such as the Wii Wheel, the Wii Zapper, guitar controllers for Guitar Hero and Rock Band games and NHL Slapshot's hockey stick accessory.

== Wii Remote Plus ==
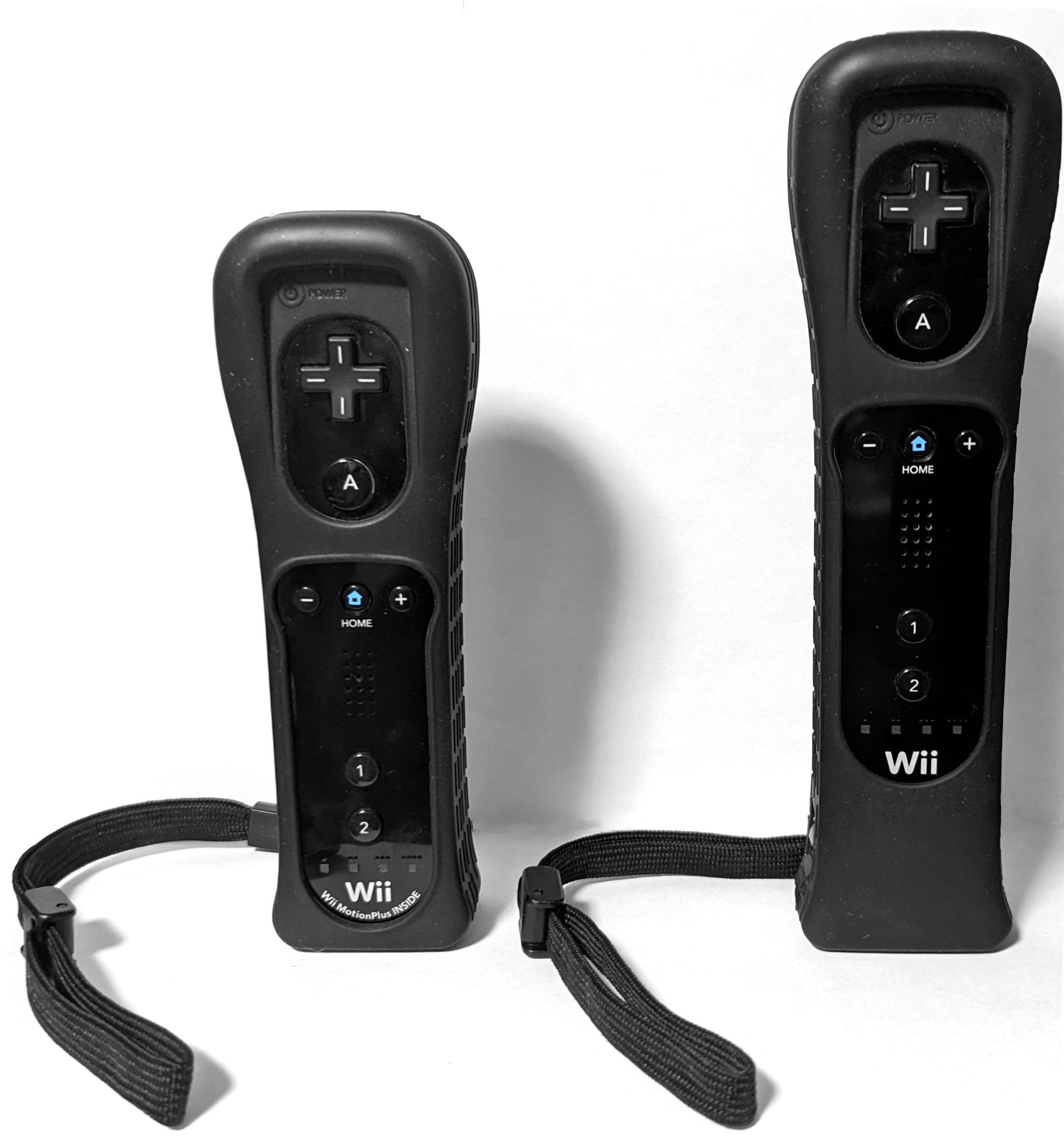
Wii Remote Plus (left) & Wii Remote with Motion Plus accessory (right)

In September 2010, rumors circulated of a Wii Remote being released with built-in Wii MotionPlus, after the upcoming FlingSmash was revealed to be bundled with "Wii Remote Plus". Nintendo initially declined to comment, but later announced the device on September 29, 2010, confirming it to be a Wii Remote with MotionPlus built in, allowing players to use peripherals like the Wii Zapper and Wii Wheel without having to remove Wii MotionPlus from the Wii Remote. It competes with the Kinect and the PlayStation Move with PlayStation Eye motion controllers for the Xbox 360 and the PlayStation 3 home consoles, respectively. Nintendo later announced that the remote would be available in white, black, blue and pink. It was released in Australia on October 28, 2010, in Europe on November 5, 2010, in North America on November 7, 2010, and in Japan on November 11, 2010. It was also released in red as part of a bundle containing Wii Sports, New Super Mario Bros. Wii, a red Wii console, and red Nunchuk.

In 2011, it was announced that the European version of Wii Play: Motion would be bundled with the red Wii Remote Plus, while the black Wii Remote Plus was also included with other versions of the game. All Wii Family Edition units contained a Wii Remote Plus. The first was released in North America on October 23, 2011, in black, along with a black Wii Family Edition console, black Nunchuk, New Super Mario Bros. Wii and a limited edition soundtrack for Super Mario Galaxy. The second was released in Europe on November 4, 2011, in white, along with a white Wii Family Edition console, white Nunchuk, Wii Party and Wii Sports. The third was also released in Europe on November 18, 2011, in blue, along with a blue Wii Family Edition console, blue Nunchuk and Mario & Sonic at the London 2012 Olympic Games. The fourth, which is a revision of the North American bundle, was released on October 28, 2012, along with the initial Wii Sports duology. A red Wii Remote Plus and red Nunchuk is also included with every Wii Mini unit.

At E3 2011, it was revealed that a gold Wii Remote Plus with the royal Hylian Crest superimposed over its speaker would be released alongside The Legend of Zelda: Skyward Sword. It was available as part of a bundle with Skyward Sword for a limited time.

After the Wii U, the Wii's successor, was launched, Nintendo began releasing Wii Remote Plus controllers that are themed off of characters from the Mario universe, starting with Mario and Luigi on November 1, 2013, to accompany the release of the Wii U Deluxe set. Months later, Nintendo released a Princess Peach-themed Wii Remote Plus, on April 24, 2014. Over a year later, Nintendo also released Wii Remote Plus controllers themed off of Bowser, a Toad and Yoshi in the fall of 2015 to accompany the releases of Super Mario Maker and Yoshi's Woolly World. These three Remotes were exclusively available at GameStop in North America.

== Third-party alternatives ==
Before Nintendo eventually released the Wii Remote Plus, third-party companies have expressed interest in designing and produced Wii Remotes with the MotionPlus technology integrated into them, eliminating the need for a separate add-on.

- Nyko revealed the Nyko Wand+ at CES 2009, a Wii Remote alternative with the MotionPlus functionality built into the device, saving players from having to change plugins.
- In Europe, snakebyte launched its Premium Remote XL +, with built-in Wii MotionPlus, and its Minimote, a smaller version of the Premium Remote, for children.
- Memorex launched a series of controllers in 2011 under the "Game Controller Plus" moniker. Available in black, pink and blue, the Game Controller Plus line has Wii MotionPlus functionality built in.

== Reception ==
Developers at Electronic Arts have noted that the fidelity of the device can be too sensitive and at times inaccurate, although technology reviewers have likened the improved accuracy as to the leap from the fidelity of VHS to that of Blu-ray.

Game reviewers at Official Nintendo Magazine have called the device "100% accurate" and stated that movements are "captured extremely accurately".

In North America, approximately 374,000 Wii MotionPlus units were sold in June 2009 (including nearly 205,000 units sold as part of a bundle with Tiger Woods PGA Tour 10), according to the NPD Group.

In Japan, the Wii MotionPlus sold approximately 650,000 units in its opening week (including units sold as part of a bundle with Wii Sports Resort), with about 296,000 sold as standalone units.

== See also ==
- Motion capture
- PlayStation Move
- PlayStation Eye
- Razer Hydra
- Kinect
