= Nintendo 2DS =

Handheld game console

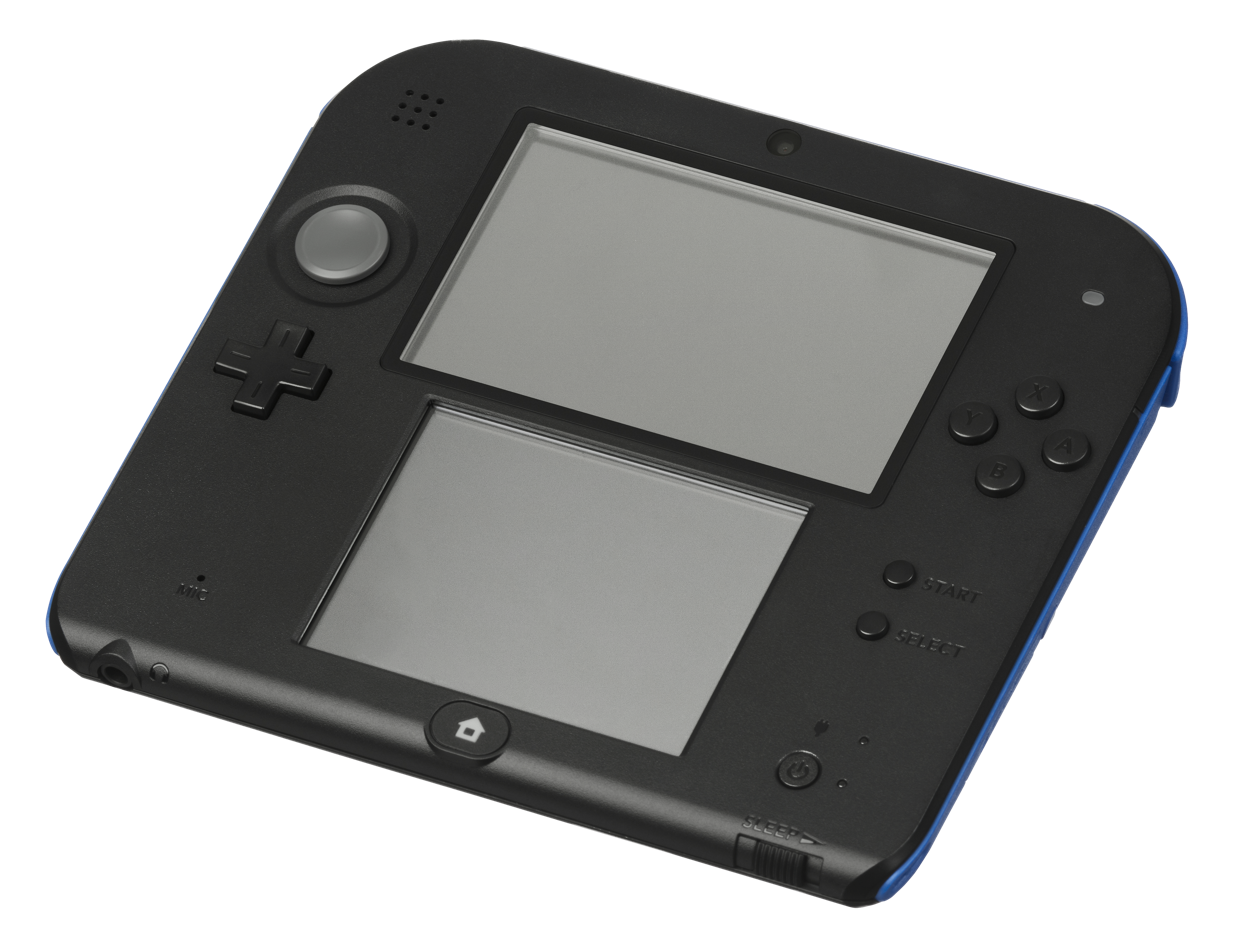
- Nintendo 2DS in Black
- Developer: Nintendo
- Product family: Nintendo 3DS family
- Type: Handheld game console
- Generation: Eighth
- Released: October 12, 2013: NA/EU/AU: October 12, 2013; BR: November 26, 2013; KOR: December 7, 2013; JP: February 27, 2016
- Lifespan: 2013–2020
- Introductory price: ¥9,980 (equivalent to ¥11,080 in 2024); US$129.99 (equivalent to $180 in 2025); A$149.95 (equivalent to $180 in 2022); £109.99 (equivalent to £150 in 2025)
- Discontinued: JP: 2018; WW: September 16, 2020
- Units shipped: 10.29 million (As of March 31, 2019)
- Media: Physical and digital: Nintendo 3DS Game Card Nintendo DSi Game Card Nintendo DS Game Card Digital distribution (Nintendo eShop) SD/SDHC card
- Operating system: Nintendo 3DS system software
- CPU: Dual-Core ARM11 MPCore, single-core ARM9
- Memory: 128 MB FCRAM, 6 MB VRAM
- Storage: Included 4 GB SD card 1 GB internal flash memory Cartridge save
- Display: Upper: 3.53" LCD @ 400×240 px (WQVGA); Lower: 3.02" resistive touchscreen LCD @ 320×240 (QVGA)
- Graphics: DMP PICA200 GPU
- Sound: Mono speaker, microphone
- Camera: One user-facing and two forward-facing VGA cameras.
- Connectivity: 2.4 GHz Wi-Fi, Infrared
- Power: 1300 mAh lithium-ion battery: 3DS games: 3.5 to 5.5 hours DS games: 5 to 9 hours Sleep Mode: ≈ 3 days
- Current firmware: 11.17.0-50, as of May 22, 2023; 3 years ago
- Online services: Nintendo Network (Discontinued): Nintendo eShop (discontinued); Miiverse (discontinued); SpotPass (Discontinued); Nintendo Zone (discontinued)
- Dimensions: Width: 14.4 cm (5.7 in); Height: 12.7 cm (5.0 in); Depth: 2.03 cm (0.80 in)
- Weight: 260 grams (9.2 oz)
- Backward compatibility: Nintendo DS/DSi
- Predecessor: Nintendo DS/DSi
- Successor: Nintendo Switch
- Related: Nintendo 3DS; New Nintendo 3DS; New Nintendo 2DS XL
- Website: www.nintendo.com/3ds/2ds

The Nintendo 2DS (Note: (Japanese: ニンテンドー2DS)) is a handheld game console produced by Nintendo. Announced on August 28, 2013, the device was released in North America, Europe and Australia on October 12, 2013. The Nintendo 2DS is an entry-level version of the Nintendo 3DS which maintains otherwise identical hardware, similar functionality, and compatibility with software designed for the Nintendo DS and 3DS. However, it lacks the Nintendo 3DS's signature autostereoscopic 3D display and was released in a new slate format rather than a clamshell format. Former Nintendo of America president Reggie Fils-Aimé stated that the 2DS was primarily targeted towards younger players (such as those under seven), whom Nintendo had previously advised not to use the 3D functionality on the 3DS due to potential eye health concerns.

Reception to the Nintendo 2DS was mixed; while Nintendo was praised for how it priced and positioned the 2DS alongside its higher-end counterparts, much criticism was directed towards its regressions in comparison to the 3DS, such as a design that some considered less appealing, lower sound quality, and poorer battery life. However, the 2DS's design was praised by some critics for being more robust and comfortable to hold than the 3DS, especially for its target market. Some critics also felt that the lack of 3D support was an admission by Nintendo that the concept was a gimmick; however, Nintendo has since stated that autostereoscopic 3D would remain a part of their future plans. The Nintendo 2DS was discontinued in Japan after 2018 and in the rest of the world after 2020, soon to be followed by New Nintendo 2DS XL, the last console in the 3DS family in production.

== History ==
Nintendo officially unveiled the 2DS on August 28, 2013, via a press release; members of the press were given a chance to demo the device in private prior to the announcement. According to Nintendo of America president Reggie Fils-Aimé, the Nintendo 2DS is primarily aimed at a younger demographic than the Nintendo 3DS—particularly, those younger than seven years old; whom Nintendo had advised not to use the 3D features on the 3DS due to potential eye health concerns.

With the 2DS, the company aimed to produce a model that would be "new, unique, different, and [bring] more people into this category that we love." Part of this goal was achieved by positioning the device at a lower price point than the 3DS; in the United States, the system retailed at US$129.99 on launch, in comparison to the US$169.99 price of the standard 3DS. By May 2016, the U.S. price had been lowered further to $79.99.

=== Launch ===
The Nintendo 2DS was released in North America, Europe and Australia on October 12, 2013, the same day as Pokémon X and Y. In North America, it was available at launch in black models with blue or red bezels, while in Europe and Australia, it was available in white with red bezels, or black with blue bezels. Matching red and blue carrying case accessories were also released on launch. With the release of the 2DS, Nintendo of America began to phase out the original 3DS, leaving the 2DS and 3DS XL as the only models still actively sold in North America as of its release.

A "Sea Green" variant with a white body and mint green accents was released in North America on June 6, 2014, to coincide with the North American release of Tomodachi Life. "Crystal Red" and "Crystal Blue" versions, which feature a translucent front cover, were released in Europe and North America in November 2014 as a tie-in for Pokémon Omega Ruby and Alpha Sapphire. In North America, the translucent models were also sold at a lower retail price of US$100 as opposed to the base US$129.99 price of the normal 2DS. On August 20, 2015, the U.S. price was permanently lowered to $100, and units began to be bundled with coupons for a digital copy of Mario Kart 7.

In December 2015, it was announced that the 2DS would be released in Japan on February 27, 2016, to coincide with the Virtual Console release of the original Game Boy Pokémon games. They were made available in translucent red, green, blue and yellow versions with colored buttons. Each were bundled with the corresponding Pokémon game, a special Home Menu theme, a poster, and a code to obtain Mew on the bundled game, or Pokémon X, Y, Omega Ruby, or Alpha Sapphire.

On May 11, 2016, Nintendo announced that the U.S. price would be lowered to $79.99 effective May 20, 2016. On September 15, 2016, the 2DS was released in standalone bundles in Japan, in blue, black, red, lavender, and pink color options. On October 5, 2016, Nintendo announced refreshed versions of the stock Mario Kart 7 2DS bundles for the U.S. market ("Crimson Red 2" and "Electric Blue 2", based on the new Japanese variants), with "swapped" color schemes featuring red or blue bodies and black bezels.

=== New Nintendo 2DS XL ===
A new model of the 2DS, titled the New Nintendo 2DS XL (branded as New Nintendo 2DS LL (Note: Nyū Nintendō Tsū Dī Esu Eru Eru (Newニンテンドー2DSLL)) in Japan), was released in Japan and Korea on July 13, 2017, Australia and New Zealand on July 15, 2017, and in North America and Europe on July 28, 2017.

Nintendo presented the "Black/Turquoise" version of the console for the North American market, and the "White/Orange" version of the console for the Japanese, South Korean and PAL region market, as well as a Japan-exclusive Dragon Quest XI limited edition. Later, the "White/Orange" variant came to North America, as well as "Lavender/White", "Black/Green" (both Japan-exclusive) as well as Poké Ball and Pikachu variants to coincide with the launch of Pokémon Ultra Sun and Ultra Moon (the former also coming to that region).

In July 2018, a "Hylian Shield" variant was released as a GameStop exclusive in North America, bundled with a pre-installed copy of The Legend of Zelda: A Link Between Worlds. This came alongside an Animal Crossing: New Leaf variant for Europe and Japan, and red/black Mario Kart 7 and Minecraft Creeper styles exclusive to Europe. The Minecraft Creeper variant was also sold in Australia, and Japan.

A month later, in August, Nintendo announced a new version of the console, "Purple/Silver", which would release in September 2018. Additionally, Nintendo confirmed that all future shipments of the "Black/Turquoise", "White/Orange" and "Purple/Silver" models would come with a pre-installed copy of Mario Kart 7.

As of 17 September 2020, the New Nintendo 2DS XL and all other remaining models in the Nintendo 3DS family have been discontinued by Nintendo.

== Hardware ==
The Nintendo 2DS's hardware specifications are almost identical to those of the Nintendo 3DS, retaining features such as its GPU, CPU and memory, along with compatibility with games designed for the Nintendo DS and Nintendo 3DS. However, its hardware still contains some differences. Unlike the Nintendo 3DS, which uses two display panels, with a lower touchscreen panel and a top dual-layered screen panel capable of displaying autostereoscopic 3D, the Nintendo 2DS uses a single, non-stereoscopic LCD touchscreen. Despite its inability to display 3D content, the 2DS retains the 3DS's dual cameras for taking photographs in a 3D format. The Nintendo 2DS only has an internal mono speaker, as opposed to the internal stereo speakers of the 3DS, although stereo sound can still be output through the headphone jack.

The Nintendo 2DS's design is a significant departure from that of its precursors; The 2DS uses a "slate-like" form factor instead of the clamshell form used by the DS and 3DS. Its buttons are positioned towards the center of the device instead of near the lower screen, and its shoulder buttons are concave in shape and relatively thicker than those of the 3DS. The 2DS uses a switch for entering sleep mode in lieu of closing the shell, and the hardware wireless switch was replaced by a software toggle.

The Nintendo 2DS contains the same 1300mAh battery present on regular Nintendo 3DS systems. Despite not supporting the 3DS's automatic brightness setting ("Power Save Mode"), the 2DS was rated by Nintendo as having slightly longer battery life than the 3DS; Nintendo rated the 2DS as being able to play from 3 to 5.5 hours of 3DS games or 5 to 9 hours of DS games on a single charge.

== Software and services ==
Aside from minor adjustments to reflect its hardware design differences, the system software of the Nintendo 2DS is otherwise identical to that of the 3DS, remaining compatible with all games released for the 3DS (in two-dimensional mode only) and DS (excluding those requiring the Game Boy Advance cartridge slot), and offering online features such as Nintendo Network for multiplayer and online gaming, Nintendo eShop for downloading and purchasing games, and SpotPass and StreetPass.

== Reception ==
=== Pre-release ===
The Nintendo 2DS received mixed reception upon its announcement. Kotaku felt that the Nintendo 2DS might appeal to a certain niche of people who otherwise would not purchase a Nintendo 3DS, and that the lack of 3D support could indicate a cooling interest in stereoscopic graphics. USA Today noted that some games that were designed with 3D in mind might not be as easily playable without the stereoscopic feature. CNET, meanwhile, called the console an acknowledgement by Nintendo that 3D was an unnecessary feature and even a "tactical mistake". NBC News called the 2DS a "peculiar choice" to gamers satisfied with the Nintendo DS line, and feared that it might take resources away from the less successful Nintendo console, the Wii U.

Some technology writers have expressed concern with the physical appearance of the 2DS: CNET considered the console to be significantly less aesthetically pleasing than its other models, though some reviewers have generally found it to be comfortable in the hand. USA Today referred to it as "surprisingly comfortable". Kotaku noted that while it may look bulky, it was pleasant to hold even with one hand. It also noted that buttons on the unit were easily accessible, and that their placement on the upper half of the console directs the eye toward the upper screen. Overall, the publication felt that the build quality was good. GamesIndustry also described the controls as considerably more comfortable than that of its predecessors. It also noted that the console had thick shell rather than the thin Nintendo 3DS, and that the lack of a hinge added durability. The publication felt that the design resembled "an unholy union of a Game Boy, the Wii U GamePad, and a DS." USA Today and CNET both had some concern over how to protect the screens, since there is no clamshell to close.

In response to the 2DS using one physical display divided to emulate two, Kyle Orland of Ars Technica believed that Nintendo had missed an opportunity to produce a full-screen gaming tablet using the 2DS's form factor; which would have enabled future games and apps to use the entire screen area (which he estimated to be around the 5-inch range used by phablets), still allow backward compatibility with games designed for the folding 3DS and DS, and enhance the ability to port existing smartphone games to the platform. However, Orland also noted that introducing such a product could fragment Nintendo's portable gaming ecosystem for existing 3DS users—and that it was too early in the 3DS's life for Nintendo to introduce a successor. Nearly 3 years after the release of the 2DS, Nintendo would ultimately announce the Nintendo Switch—a "hybrid" gaming tablet with detachable wireless controllers, and support of a docking station for use with a television.

Calling it a "smart move" to redesign the Nintendo 3DS so as to lower costs, Wired felt that the 2DS might enable Nintendo to sell the console at a significantly lower price with a significantly higher profit margin.

=== Post-release ===
The Nintendo 2DS has received mixed reviews. While pricing and form-factor were generally considered ideal, the console's aesthetics and battery life were widely criticized. The Telegraph noted that the lack of hinges in the console improved its robustness, and that rounding out the footprint makes it an ideal handheld for children. However, the publication criticized the console's mono speaker, which offered a lower sound quality than its predecessors. It also criticized the battery life, which it described as being the same as the original 3DS model. On the other hand, it praised the screens' brighter display and wider viewing angle, despite their not being as large as those of the 3DS XL. Eurogamer reinforced the idea that the Nintendo 2DS isn't aimed at "seasoned players" or current Nintendo 3DS owners, and felt that the system wasn't produced with aesthetics in mind. The publication also criticized the resistive touchscreen, which felt outdated, the mono speaker and battery life. However, Eurogamer felt that the system is much more comfortable to hold than the Nintendo 3DS and 3DS XL. Analyst Piers Harding-Rolls felt that the Nintendo 2DS would help Nintendo broaden its market, and believes that third-party publishers will have more commitment to the platform moving forward.

Following the system's launch, Nintendo stated that the release of Sonic Lost World would boost Nintendo 2DS sales, labeling it as a "must play" title. On October 31, 2013, Nintendo president Satoru Iwata admitted that the Nintendo 2DS lacked awareness among prospective purchasers. Additionally, he went on to say that some potential consumers believed that the product was too large and heavy to carry. However, Iwata stated that the system was well received among those who had purchased it. Despite the 2DS's lack of 3D support, Satoru Iwata insisted, during Nintendo's 2013 third quarter investors Q&A, that the company "will [not] abandon 3D or cease to make new propositions in 3D", as it will continue to sell the existing Nintendo 3DS and 3DS XL platforms. However, The Legend of Zelda: A Link Between Worlds producer Eiji Aonuma revealed in an interview that the game had minor changes in development due to the lack of 3D on the 2DS.

=== Sales ===
Sales of the Nintendo 2DS surged three weeks after launching in the United Kingdom, after retailers cut its price due to poor sales. The system was available for around £110, but major retailers including Argos, Amazon and Tesco cut the system's price to under £100 to coincide with the school half-term. As a result, sales of the Nintendo 2DS increased by 64% week-on-week, making it the UK's best-selling console of the month, without combining the sales of the Nintendo 3DS and its larger counterpart. During the third quarter of 2013, video game retailer GameStop reported that worldwide hardware sales grew by 15.3%, mainly due to strong Nintendo 2DS and 3DS sales.
