= Nintendo 3DS =

Handheld game console

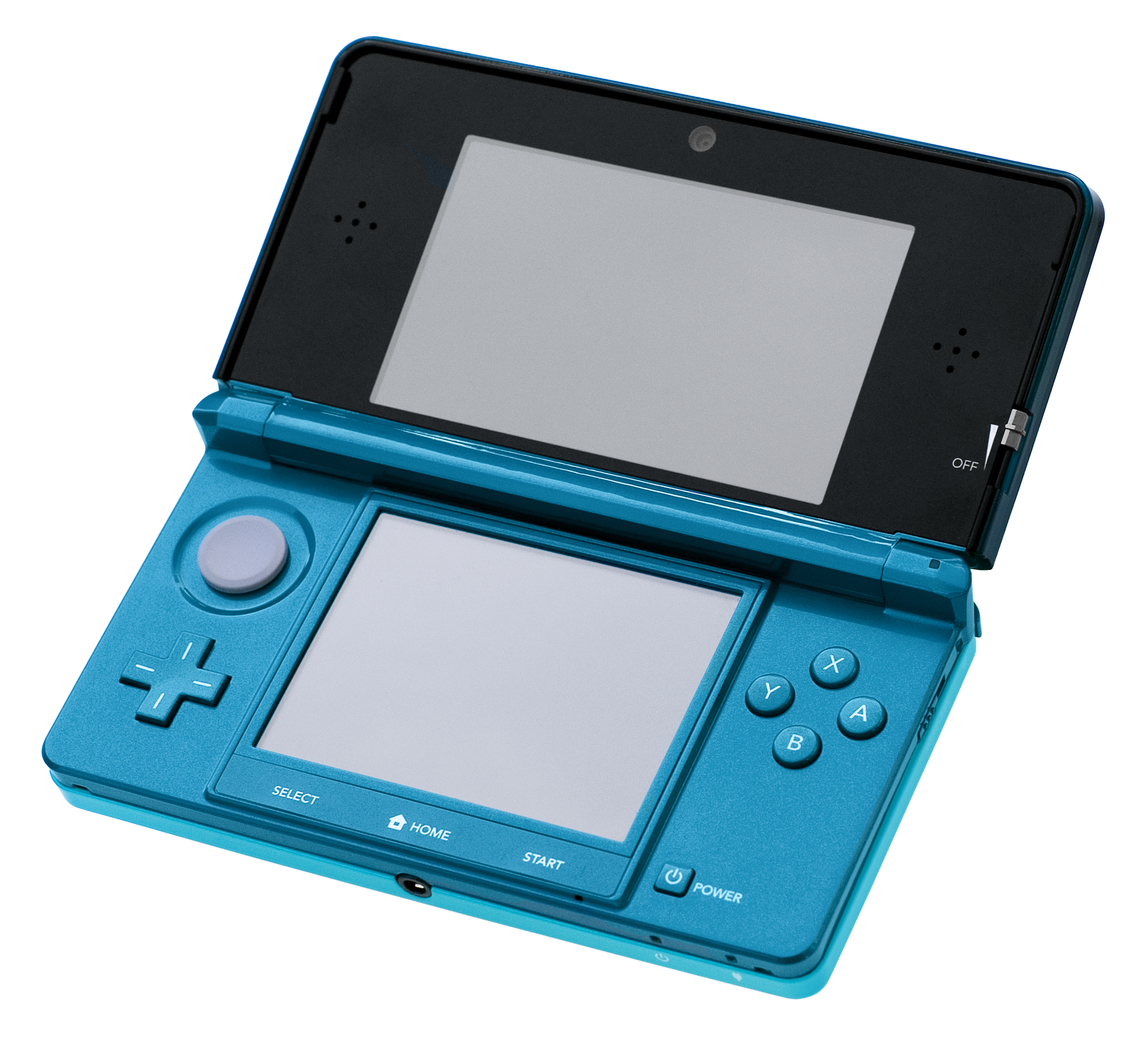
- The original Nintendo 3DS in aqua blue in its open position
- Codename: CTR · Centrair · Citrus
- Also known as: iQue 3DS (China)
- Developer: Nintendo Research & Engineering
- Manufacturer: Nintendo, Foxconn
- Product family: Nintendo 3DS family
- Type: Handheld game console
- Generation: Eighth
- Released: February 26, 2011: Nintendo 3DS: JP: February 26, 2011; EU: March 25, 2011; NA: March 27, 2011; AU: March 31, 2011 Nintendo 3DS XL: JP/EU: July 28, 2012 (Note: As Nintendo 3DS LL in Japan); NA: August 19, 2012; AU: August 23, 2012
- Introductory price: 3DS: ¥25,000 (equivalent to ¥28,690 in 2024); US$249.99 (equivalent to $360 in 2025); A$349.99 (equivalent to $450 in 2022); 3DS XL: US$199.99 (equivalent to $280 in 2025); A$349.99 (equivalent to $440 in 2022); 3DS LL: ¥18,900 (equivalent to ¥21,690 in 2024)
- Discontinued: September 16, 2020
- Units shipped: 75.94 million (as of September 30, 2022)
- Media: Nintendo 3DS Game Card; Nintendo DSi Game Card; Nintendo DS Game Card; Digital distribution; SD/SDHC card
- Operating system: Nintendo 3DS system software
- CPU: Dual-core ARM11 MPCore @ 268 MHz; Single-core ARM9
- Memory: 128 MB FCRAM, 6 MB VRAM
- Storage: 2 GB eMMC
- Removable storage: 3DS: SD card (2 GB included); 3DS XL: SDHC card (4 GB included)
- Display: 2 LCD screens: Nintendo 3DS: Upper: 3.53" autostereoscopic (3D) LCD @ 800 × 240 px (400 × 240 WQVGA per eye); Lower: 3.00" resistive touchscreen LCD @ 320 × 240 (QVGA); Nintendo 3DS XL / Nintendo 3DS LL: Upper: 4.88" autostereoscopic (3D) LCD @ 800 × 240 px (400 × 240 WQVGA per eye); Lower: 4.18" resistive touchscreen LCD @ 320 × 240 (QVGA)
- Graphics: DMP PICA200 @ 268 MHz
- Sound: Stereo speakers (pseudo-surround), microphone
- Input: A/B/X/Y buttons, Circle Pad, L/R bumpers, D-pad, 3D depth slider, volume slider, wireless switch, power button
- Camera: Rear: 2 × 0.3 MP, f/2.85 Front: 0.3 MP, f/2.85 240p video recording
- Connectivity: 2.4 GHz 802.11b/g Wi-Fi, infrared
- Power: Nintendo 3DS: 1300 mAh, 3.7 V, 5 Wh lithium-ion battery; Battery life; 3DS games: 3–5 hours; DS games: 5–8 hours; Sleep Mode: ≈ 3 days; Nintendo 3DS XL / Nintendo 3DS LL: 1750 mAh, 3.7 V, 6.5 Wh lithium-ion battery; Battery life; 3DS games: 3.5–6.5 hours; DS games: 7–10 hours; Sleep Mode: ≈ 3 days
- Current firmware: 11.17.0-50, as of May 22, 2023; 3 years ago
- Online services: Nintendo Network (discontinued): Nintendo eShop (discontinued); Miiverse (discontinued); SpotPass (discontinued); Nintendo Zone (discontinued)
- Dimensions: Body: 3DS: 134 × 74 × 21 mm (5.28 × 2.91 × 0.83 in); 3DS XL: 156 × 93 × 22 mm (6.14 × 3.66 × 0.87 in)
- Weight: 3DS: 235 g (8.3 oz); 3DS XL: 336 g (11.9 oz)
- Best-selling game: Mario Kart 7, 18.99 million units (as of March 31, 2023) (list)
- Backward compatibility: Nintendo DS
- Predecessor: Nintendo DS
- Successor: Nintendo Switch
- Related: Nintendo 2DS; New Nintendo 3DS; New Nintendo 2DS XL

The Nintendo 3DS (Note: Japanese: ニンテンドー3DS, Hepburn: Nintendō Surī Dī Esu) is a foldable dual-screen handheld game console developed and marketed by Nintendo. Announced in March 2010 and released beginning in early 2011, it succeeds the Nintendo DS and DSi. Building on the basic design of the DS, the 3DS retains the clamshell form factor and backward compatibility with Nintendo DS software, while introducing autostereoscopic 3D visuals that do not require special glasses. As an eighth-generation console, its primary competitor was Sony's PlayStation Vita.

The Nintendo 3DS was released in Japan on February 26, 2011, and worldwide beginning the next month. Less than six months after launch, Nintendo announced a significant price reduction from US$249.99 to US$169.99 amid disappointing launch sales. The company offered free games from the Nintendo eShop to consumers who bought the system at the original launch price via the Ambassador Certificate. This strategy was considered a major success, and the console went on to become one of Nintendo's most successful handheld consoles in the first two years of its release. As of December 31, 2025, the Nintendo 3DS family of systems combined have sold 75.94 million units, and games for the systems have sold 392.29 million units.

The 3DS family received several hardware revisions during its lifespan. The Nintendo 3DS XL, featuring larger screens, launched in July 2012. The Nintendo 2DS, an entry-level model with a non-folding design and no 3D display, followed in October 2013. The New Nintendo 3DS and New Nintendo 2DS XL added upgraded hardware and additional controls, beginning in October 2014. Nintendo discontinued the 3DS line on September 16, 2020. The Nintendo eShop closed on March 27, 2023, and Nintendo Network features ended on April 8, 2024, with limited exceptions.

== History ==
=== Background ===
Nintendo began experimenting with stereoscopic 3D video game technology in the 1980s. The Famicom 3D System, an accessory consisting of liquid crystal shutter glasses, was Nintendo's first product that enabled stereoscopic 3D effects. Although few titles were released, Nintendo helped design one—called Famicom Grand Prix II: 3D Hot Rally—which was co-developed by Nintendo and HAL Laboratory and released in 1988. The Famicom 3D System failed to garner market interest and was never released outside Japan.

Nintendo's second attempt with 3D development was the Virtual Boy, designed by Gunpei Yokoi, creator of the Game Boy handheld console, Kid Icarus, and popular Metroid video game. It was a portable table-top system consisting of separate handheld controller and goggles that used two tiny, rapidly oscillating mirrors to achieve stereoscopic monochrome 3D. Released in 1995, the Virtual Boy sold fewer than a million units, with only 22 compatible game titles released, and was widely considered to be a commercial failure. Shigeru Miyamoto, known for his work on popular game franchises such as Mario and The Legend of Zelda, commented in a 2011 interview that he felt conflicted about Yokoi's decision to use wire-frame models for 3D and suggested that the product may not have been marketed correctly. The failure of the Virtual Boy left many at Nintendo doubting the viability of 3D gaming.

Despite this, Nintendo continued to investigate the incorporation of 3D technology into later products. The GameCube, released in 2001, was also capable of displaying true stereoscopic 3D with an LCD attachment, though only the launch title Luigi's Mansion was ever designed to utilize it. While a working internal prototype was created, the add-on itself was never released due to its expensive cost, leaving the feature unavailable outside of development. Nintendo later experimented with a 3D LCD during the development of the Game Boy Advance SP, but the idea was shelved after it failed to achieve satisfactory results. Another attempt was made in preparation for a virtual navigation guide to be used on the Nintendo DS at Shigureden, an interactive museum in Japan. Nintendo president Hiroshi Yamauchi encouraged additional 3D research in an effort to use the technology in the exhibition. Although the project fell short, Nintendo was able to collect valuable research on liquid crystal which would later aid in the development of the Nintendo 3DS.

=== Development ===
Speculation on the development of a successor to the Nintendo DS began in late 2009. At the time, Nintendo controlled as much as 68.3% of the handheld gaming market. In October 2009, tech tabloid Bright Side of News reported that Nvidia, a graphics processing unit (GPU) developer that recently made headway with its Tegra System-on-Chip processors, had been selected by Nintendo to develop hardware for their next generation portable game console. Later that month, speaking about the future for Nintendo's portable consoles, company president Satoru Iwata mentioned that while mobile broadband connectivity via subscription "doesn't fit Nintendo customers", he was interested in exploring options like Amazon's Whispernet found on the Amazon Kindle which provides free wireless connectivity to its customers for the sole purpose of browsing and purchasing content from the Kindle Store.

Nintendo had expressed interest in motion-sensing capabilities since the development of the original Nintendo DS, and an alleged comment by Satoru Iwata from a 2010 interview with Asahi Shimbun implied that the successor to the Nintendo DS would incorporate a motion sensor. The claim led to a minor dispute between the publication and Nintendo over its accuracy. In February 2010, video gaming website Computer and Video Games reported that a select "handful" of Japanese developers were in possession of software development kits for the Nintendo DS successor, with The Pokémon Company given special priority. According to their insider at an unspecified third-party development studio, the hardware features a "tilt" function that is similar to that of the iPhone, "but does a lot more".

=== Announcement ===
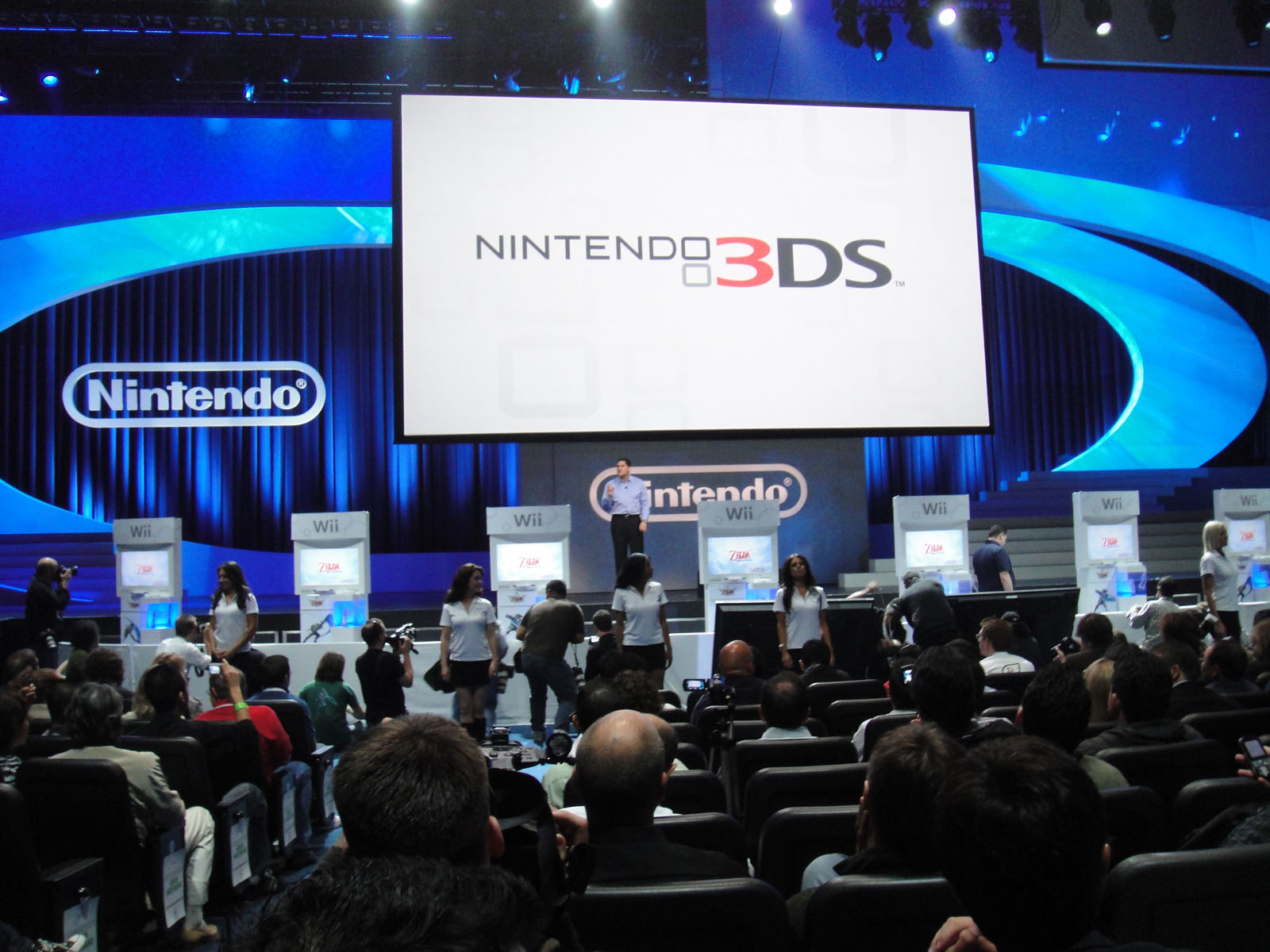
The Nintendo 3DS E3 2010 unveiling involved an elaborate stage with moving set pieces.

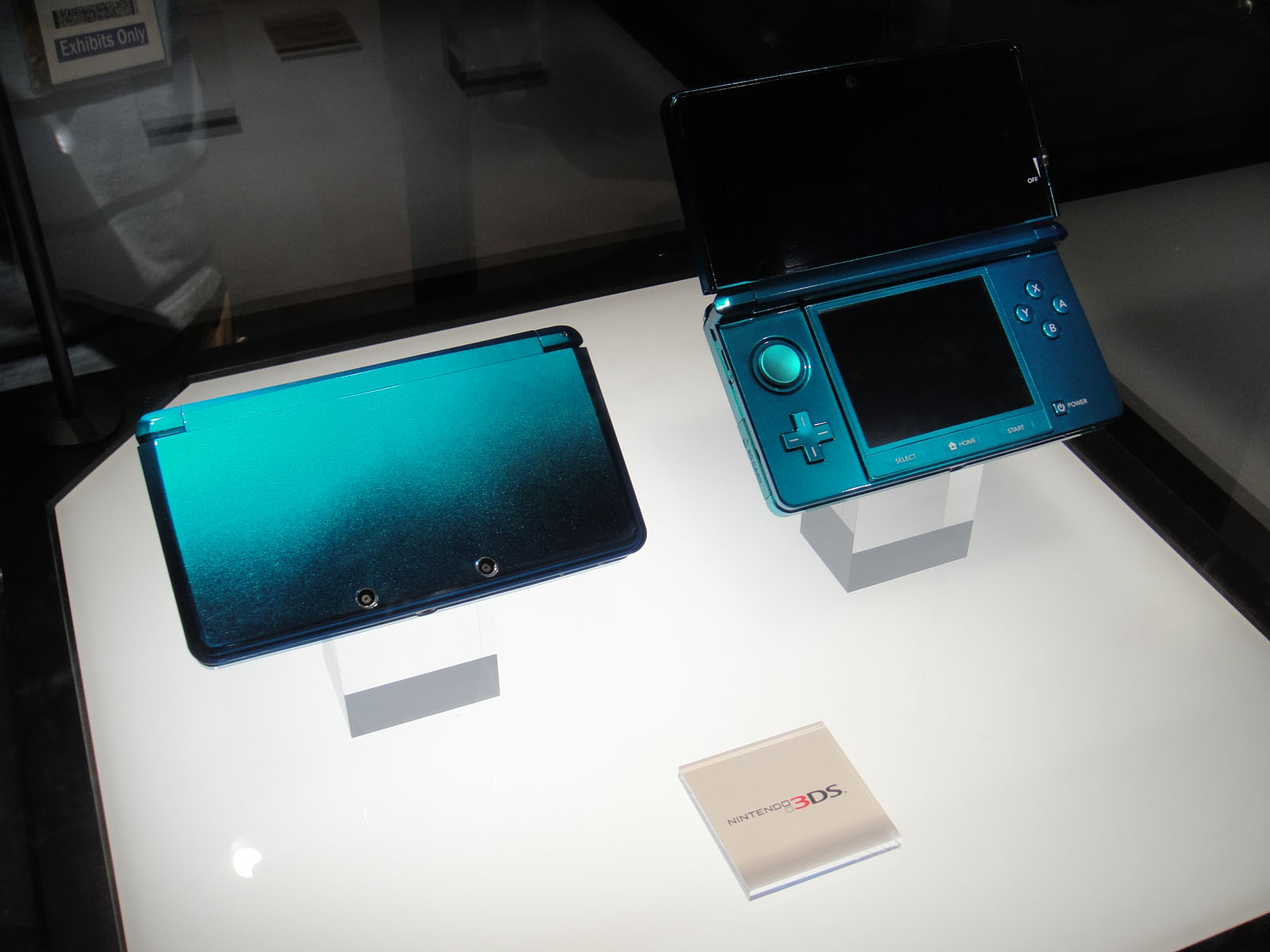
A prototype Aqua Blue Nintendo 3DS shown at E3 2010; the circle pad was originally colored alongside the console.

On March 23, 2010, Nintendo officially announced the Nintendo 3DS handheld console. According to industry analysts, the timing of the announcement, which had drawn attention away from the launch of the company's still-new Nintendo DSi XL handheld, was likely intended to preempt impending news leaks about the product by the Japanese press. In April 2010, a picture of a possible development build of the internal components of the 3DS was released as part of a U.S. Federal Communications Commission (FCC) filing by Mitsumi. An analysis of the image showed that it was likely genuine as it featured components known to be used in the Nintendo DS line along with features of the 3DS that had not been announced like a 5:3 top screen and a control nub similar to those used in Sony's PlayStation Portable systems.

In June 2010, video gaming website IGN reported that according to "several developers who have experienced 3DS in its current form," the system possesses processing power that "far exceed[s] the Nintendo Wii" and with 3D shaders, they could make games that "look close to current generation visuals on the Xbox 360 and PlayStation 3". IGN also cited "several developer sources" as saying that the system does not use the Nvidia Tegra mobile chipset.

The system was fully revealed at Nintendo's conference at E3 2010 on June 15, 2010. The first game revealed was Kid Icarus: Uprising, and several other titles from third parties were also announced, including Square Enix with Kingdom Hearts 3D, Konami with Metal Gear Solid: Snake Eater 3D, Ubisoft with Assassin's Creed: Lost Legacy, and Capcom with Resident Evil: Revelations and Super Street Fighter IV: 3D Edition. Other Nintendo-developed titles revealed after the conference included Mario Kart 7 (then named Mario Kart 3DS), Animal Crossing: New Leaf, Star Fox 64 3D, and The Legend of Zelda: Ocarina of Time 3D. Nintendo also demoed 3D trailers of the movies How to Train Your Dragon, Legend of the Guardians: The Owls of Ga'Hoole, and Tangled on the 3DS. The 3DS design shown at E3 was almost final, but subject to minor changes.

On September 29, 2010, Nintendo announced that the Nintendo 3DS would be released in Japan on February 26, 2011. Furthermore, several additional features were announced: the inclusion of a Mii Maker (similar to the Mii Channel on the Wii), Virtual Console (including Game Boy and Game Boy Color), 3D Classics, a cradle for recharging the system's battery, multitasking, several included augmented reality games, an included 2 GB SD card, and stored game data, as well as the final names for the 3DS tag modes, StreetPass and SpotPass. Nintendo further revealed that the system would be available at launch in two colors, "Aqua Blue" and "Cosmo Black", and that its launch price in Japan would be ¥25,000. The final physical design was also revealed at this event.

=== Pre-launch events ===
On January 19, 2011, Nintendo held two simultaneous press conferences in Amsterdam and New York City, where it revealed all of the features of the Nintendo 3DS. In North America, the release date was confirmed as March 27, 2011, with a retail price of $249.99. In Europe, the release date was announced as March 25, 2011, though Nintendo said that pricing would be up to retailers. Most retailers priced the handheld between £219.99 and £229.99, though some retailers, such as Amazon, lowered the price following Sony's announcement of the PSP's successor on January 26, 2011, with some retailers pricing the handheld at around £200 in February.

In February 2011, Nintendo held four hands-on events in the UK named "Believe Your Eyes". February 5 and 6 saw simultaneous events in London and Manchester, while the 12th and 13th saw events in Glasgow and Bristol. Invitations to the events were offered first to Club Nintendo members, then later to members of the public via an online registration form. Guests watched two brief performances and trailers, then were given time to play a selection of games on 3DS devices. Attendees were then allowed into a second room, containing further games to play (mainly augmented reality-based) and in-device videos.

=== Launch ===
The Nintendo 3DS launched in Japan on February 26, 2011 (priced at ¥25,000), followed by releases in Europe on March 25, North America on March 27, and Australia on March 31. The handheld quickly ran into slower-than-expected sales due to several factors. Most notably, the 3DS's price of US$249.99 (equivalent to $358 in 2025), the highest ever for a Nintendo handheld, deterred many consumers, especially compared to the original Nintendo DS, which launched at $150 in 2004. The compact design of the launch model also drew criticism, as it proved uncomfortable for prolonged use by adults. Meanwhile, the device's stereoscopic 3D effect, though technologically impressive, caused eye fatigue and came with a warning that it should not be used by children under six, one of Nintendo's core demographics. Lastly, the launch lineup lacked any flagship Nintendo franchises. The rise of mobile gaming on a phone also led to diminishing interest in handheld consoles in general, affecting the 3DS's sales.

In response, Nintendo announced a major price cut on July 28, 2011, reducing the console's price by nearly a third, to US$169.99 (equivalent to $243 in 2025) in North America and ¥15,000 in Japan. To appease early adopters, Nintendo launched the 3DS Ambassador Program, offering 20 free classic games to users who accessed the eShop before August 21. These included ten NES titles, such as Super Mario Bros., The Legend of Zelda, and Metroid, as well as ten Game Boy Advance games, including Mario Kart: Super Circuit, The Legend of Zelda: The Minish Cap, and WarioWare, Inc.: Mega Microgames!.

The 3DS expanded to new markets with its South Korean release on April 28, 2012, followed by launches in Hong Kong and Taiwan on September 28, 2012. Maxsoft distributed console to Singapore, Malaysia, Indonesia, Philippines, Thailand, United Arab Emirates and Sunder Electronics to India.

Nintendo also addressed design criticisms by introducing cheaper hardware options that ditched the stereoscopic 3D screens (Nintendo 2DS) and larger hardware models.

=== Larger model ===
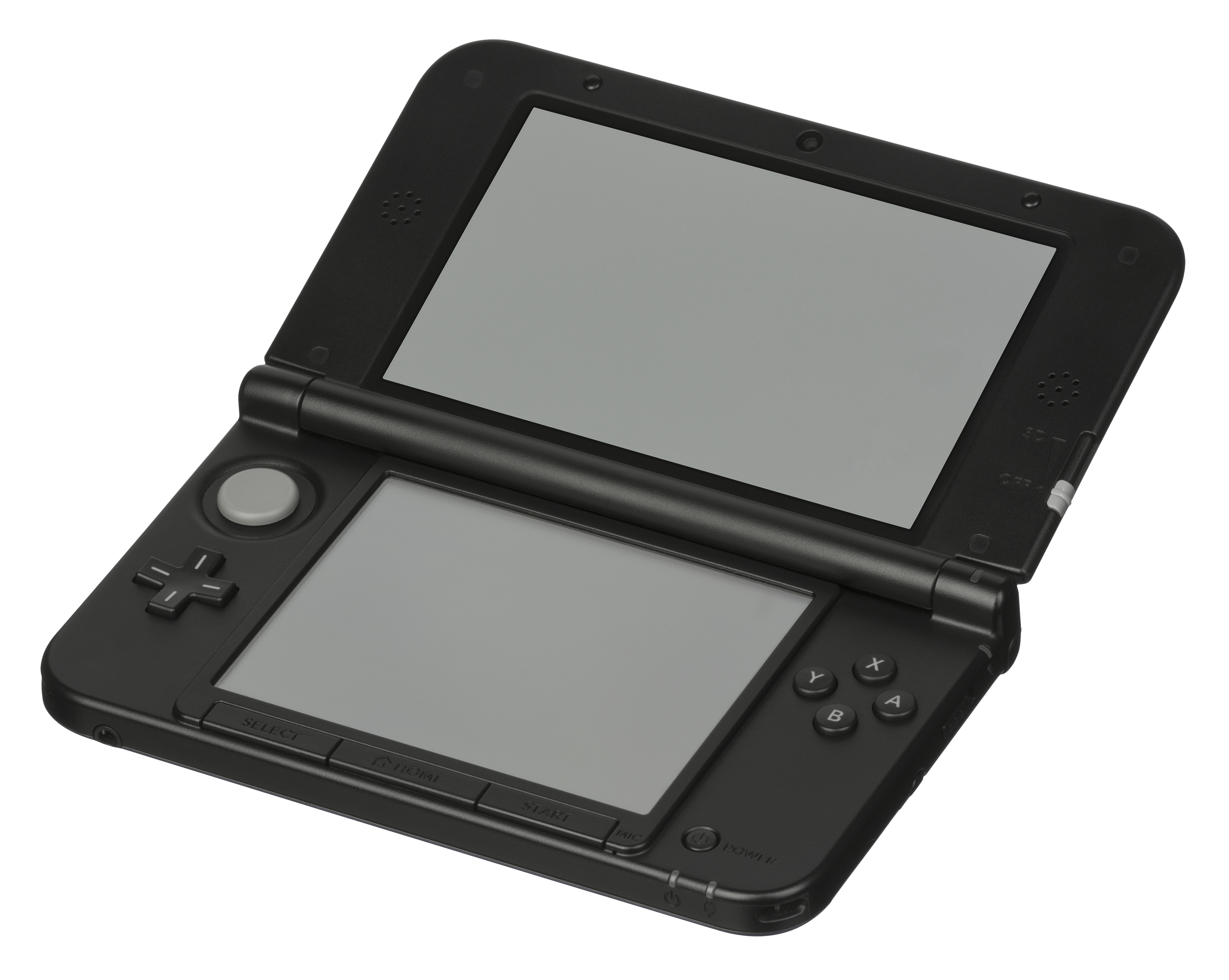
A Nintendo 3DS XL in the open position

Rumors of a larger 3DS began circulating in June 2012, fueled by a report from Japanese publication Nikkei, which claimed the system would be unveiled at E3 2012. While Nintendo initially dismissed the report as speculative, it officially announced the Nintendo 3DS XL on June 21, 2012, during a Nintendo Direct presentation.

This new version, featuring screens 90% larger than the original, was released worldwide later that year, providing a more comfortable option for extended play.

The Nintendo 3DS XL (Nintendo 3DS LL in Japan) was released on July 28, 2012, in Japan, priced at ¥18,900, and was available in Silver + Black, Red + Black and White color variations. In Europe, the system launched on the same day but in Silver + Black, Blue + Black and Red + Black color variations. On August 19, the Nintendo 3DS XL launched in North America, priced at US$199.99, and available in Blue + Black and Red + Black. On August 23, 2012, Australia and New Zealand saw the launch of the new handheld, priced at AU$249.95, and available in the same color variations as in Europe, Silver + Black, Blue + Black and Red + Black. The launch of the Nintendo 3DS XL coincided with the release of New Super Mario Bros. 2, the first Nintendo 3DS game to be available in both retail and downloadable versions.

On September 20, 2012, the Nintendo 3DS XL launched in South Korea, in Silver + Black, Red + Black, and White color variations. On September 28, 2012, the system launched in two other regions, Hong Kong and Taiwan, in Blue + Black and White color variations. In December 2012, Nintendo Chinese distribution partner, iQue, launched the iQue 3DS XL in three special editions, one featuring a Mario decal while the other two feature both Mario and Luigi.

=== Later years ===
Nintendo unveiled its next console, the Nintendo Switch, in October 2016, with a global release in March 2017. The Switch is a hybrid video game console that functions both as a home console when docked to a television, and as a handheld system.

Although Nintendo avoided positioning the Switch as a direct successor to the Wii U or 3DS, it gradually assumed their roles as the company's main home and handheld console. The Wii U was discontinued shortly before the Switch's launch, while the 3DS remained in production until 2020 as an entry-level option for younger players.

At the time of the Switch's release, Nintendo executives, including Reggie Fils-Aimé, expressed confidence in the 3DS's ability to coexist alongside the Switch. In 2017, Fils-Aimé reaffirmed support for the 3DS beyond 2018. However, that same year, sales of the New Nintendo 3DS ended in Europe and Japan, leaving the New Nintendo 3DS XL and New Nintendo 2DS XL as the only models available.

In June 2018, Nintendo suggested that it was exploring options for a potential successor to the 3DS. In July 2019, the company introduced the Nintendo Switch Lite—a lower-cost, handheld-only version of the Switch—while still maintaining that the 3DS would be supported as long as consumer demand persisted. By that time, however, 3DS sales had dropped nearly 50% year-over-year, the release schedule had slowed to a trickle, and Nintendo had quietly scaled back its support for the platform. Its last original first-party release was WarioWare Gold, a 2018 minigame collection.

Despite dwindling demand, Nintendo would continue supporting the 3DS family until it was officially discontinued on September 16, 2020. The 3DS eShop closed on March 27, 2023, and Nintendo Network online services were discontinued on April 8, 2024.

== Hardware ==
The original Nintendo 3DS uses custom hardware co-developed by Nintendo Research & Engineering and several manufacturing partners, integrated into a single system on a chip. It features a dual-core ARM11 MPCore–based central processing unit (CPU), with one core reserved for the operating system to support multitasking, and an additional ARM9 processor used primarily for backward compatibility with Nintendo DS and DSi software. Visuals are handled by a PICA200 graphics processing unit (GPU). The system includes 128 MB of FCRAM, along with 2 GB of internal eMMC flash storage, expandable via SD cards.

The Nintendo 3DS has two separate TFT LCD displays. The top screen has a 5:3 aspect ratio and can display 3D images without special glasses using an autostereoscopic parallax barrier. Its native resolution is 800 × 240 pixels (400 × 240 pixels per eye, or WQVGA). On the original model, the top screen measures 3.53 inches (90 mm) diagonally, while on the 3DS XL it measures 4.88 in (124 mm). A "3D Depth Slider" beside the screen allows players to adjust or disable the 3D effect. The lower screen is a 4:3 resistive touchscreen with a resolution of 320 × 240 pixels (QVGA), It also retains the same aspect ratio as the Nintendo DS. The bottom screen measures 3.02 in (77 mm) on the original 3DS and 4.18 in (106 mm) on the 3DS XL. Although the XL model uses physically larger displays, both models share the same resolutions, resulting in lower pixel density on the XL compared with the standard 3DS.

The 3DS includes three cameras: two outward-facing cameras for capturing 3D photos and video, and a single inward-facing camera above the top screen. All three have a maximum resolution of 640 × 480 pixels (0.3 megapixels, VGA). However, when taking 3D photos, the image is displayed cropped in. built-in microphone is located on the front edge of the system. Connectivity features include Wi-Fi (2.4 GHz 802.11 b/g) and an infrared port used by accessories such as the Circle Pad Pro and the amiibo reader/writer.

The Nintendo 3DS uses a 3.7 V 1300 mAh 5 Wh lithium ion battery. Battery life is rated at roughly 3–5 hours when playing Nintendo 3DS titles and 5–8 hours when playing Nintendo DS titles, depending on display brightness, volume, and wireless use. The Nintendo 3DS XL includes a 3.7 V, 1750 mAh battery, lasting approximately 3.5–6.5 hours for 3DS games and 6–10 hours for DS games. The original 3DS weighs about 230 grams (8.1 oz), while the 3DS XL weighs about 336 g (11.9 oz). When opened, the original model measures 134 × 74 × 21 mm (5.28 × 2.91 × 0.83 in), compared with 156 × 93 × 22 mm (6.14 × 3.66 × 0.87 in) for the XL. The 3DS includes a telescoping stylus extendable to 100 mm (3.9 in), while the 3DS XL includes a fixed 93 mm (3.7 in) stylus.

All systems in the Nintendo 3DS family use the same AC adapter as the Nintendo DSi. To reduce manufacturing costs, some bundles—particularly in Japan and Europe—did not include an adapter, requiring users to purchase one separately or reuse an existing unit. The original 3DS was packaged with a charging cradle; cradles for the 3DS XL and New Nintendo 3DS models were sold separately, and none was produced for the Nintendo 2DS.

=== iQue 3DS XL ===
The Nintendo 3DS was sold in the Chinese market under the iQue name, a collaboration of Nintendo and Wei Yen, and was known as the iQue 3DS XL. This was the last console sold under the iQue name, and the only model of 3DS available in China. No physical games were ever sold for the system, and only Super Mario 3D Land and Mario Kart 7 were supplied preinstalled.

=== Input ===
The Nintendo 3DS features multiple input controls, including a round analog nub called the Circle Pad, a D-pad, four face action buttons (A, B, X, Y), two shoulder buttons (L and R), Start and Select buttons, and a Home button. Additional controls include a Power button, a volume slider and a wireless switch to enable or disable wireless communication. The lower touchscreen can be used with either a finger or the included stylus. The system also has a six-axis motion sensor, combining a three-axis accelerometer and a three-axis gyroscope. With the Circle Pad Pro accessory, players gain a second Circle Pad and extra trigger buttons (ZL, ZR).

=== Game card ===
The Nintendo 3DS Game Card is the physical media format used to distribute games for the 3DS family of systems. It is similar in design to the Nintendo DS Game Card but includes a small tab in the top-left corner that prevents 3DS Game Cards from being inserted into a DS system. Game Cards are available in capacities of 1 GB, 2 GB or 4 GB, which are 2, 4, and 8 times larger, respectively, than the maximum capacity of a Nintendo DS Game Card (512 MB). Although an 8 GB version was reportedly possible, it was never produced.

=== Accessories ===
==== Circle Pad Pro ====
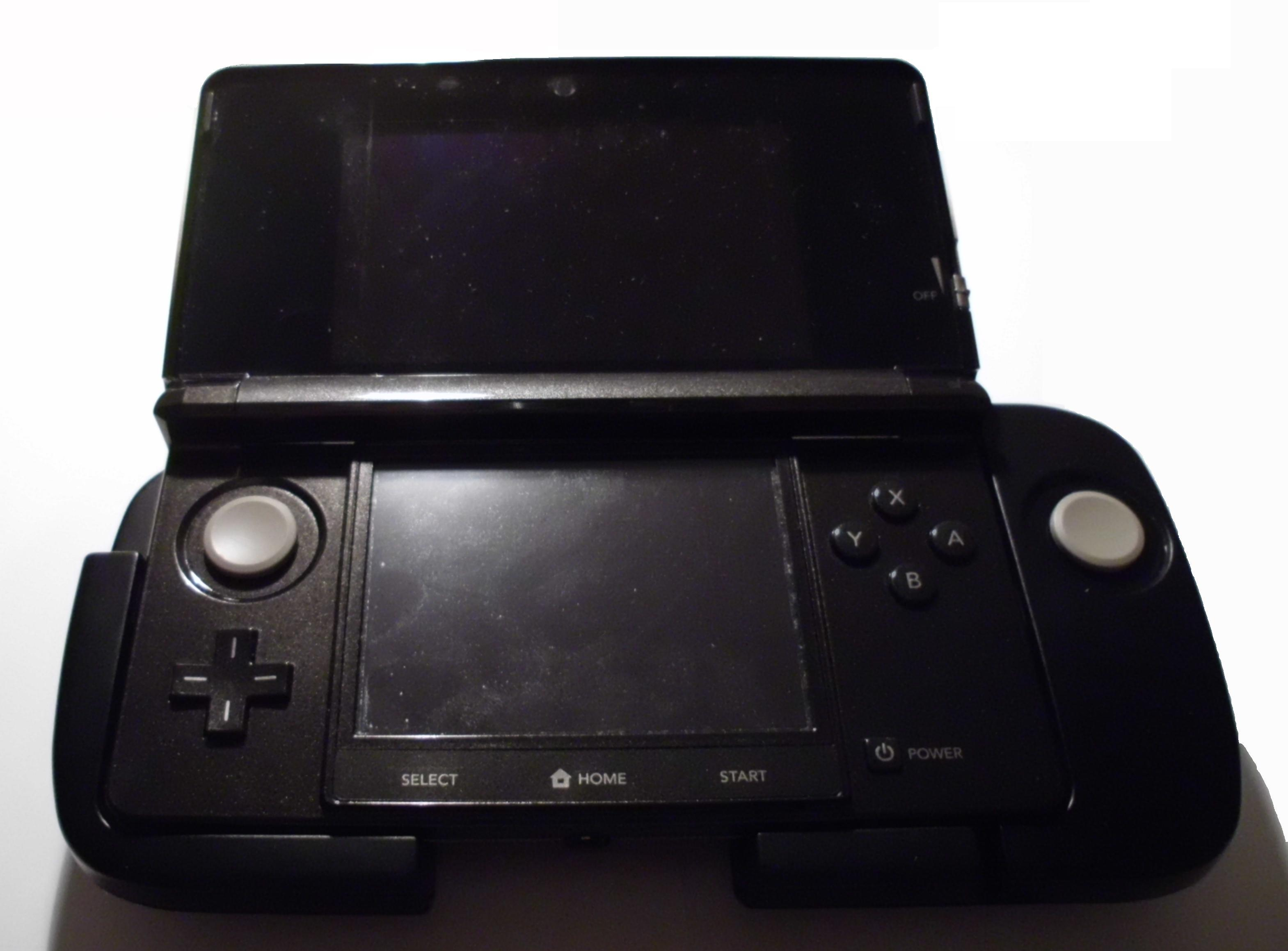
The Circle Pad Pro accessory for the original Nintendo 3DS

The Circle Pad Pro is an accessory/add-on which connects to a Nintendo 3DS system through infrared, adding support for a second Circle Pad, a substitute R button input (as the original one becomes difficult to reach), and an extra set of trigger buttons (ZL / ZR). The device was first released in Japan on December 10, 2011, coinciding with the release of Monster Hunter 3G in the region. It was subsequently released in Europe on January 27, 2012, in Australia on February 2, 2012, and in North America on February 7, 2012, coinciding with the release of Resident Evil: Revelations in those regions.

Images of the device first appeared in September 2011 in Famitsu. The first titles confirmed to compatible with the add-on were Monster Hunter 3G, Resident Evil: Revelations, Ace Combat 3D Cross Rumble (Japanese version only), Metal Gear Solid: Snake Eater 3D, Kingdom Hearts 3D: Dream Drop Distance, and Shin Sangoku Musou VS.

The Nintendo 3DS XL version of the device, called the Circle Pad Pro XL, was released in Japan on November 15, 2012, Europe on March 22, 2013, and North America on April 17, 2013.

The C-Stick and ZL / ZR buttons on the New Nintendo 3DS are backward compatible with Circle Pad Pro-compatible titles.

Title	Release date	Publisher	Notes
Monster Hunter 3 Ultimate	December 10, 2011	Capcom	No support in the demo in all regions.
Ace Combat 3D: Cross Rumble	January 12, 2012	Bandai Namco Games	Support was removed in the international release and is only available in the Japanese version.
Resident Evil: Revelations	January 26, 2012	Capcom	The peripheral is supported in the demo for all regions.
Metal Gear Solid: Snake Eater 3D	February 21, 2012	Konami	
Kid Icarus: Uprising	March 22, 2012	Nintendo	
Kingdom Hearts 3D: Dream Drop Distance	March 29, 2012	Square Enix	
Shin Sangoku Musou VS	April 26, 2012	Koei Tecmo	
Sengoku Musou Chronicle 2nd	September 13, 2012	Koei Tecmo	
E.X. Troopers	November 22, 2012	Capcom	
3D Galaxy Force II	July 24, 2013	SEGA	
Monster Hunter 4	September 14, 2013	Capcom	
One Piece: Unlimited World Red	November 21, 2013	Bandai Namco Games	
Steel Diver: Sub Wars	February 13, 2014	Nintendo	
Senran Kagura 2: Deep Crimson	August 7, 2014	Marvelous	
Dragon Quest X	September 4, 2014	Square Enix	
Monster Hunter 4 Ultimate	October 11, 2014	Capcom	
Attack on Titan: Humanity in Chains	December 4, 2014	Spike Chunsoft	
Samurai Warriors Chronicles 3	December 4, 2014	Koei Tecmo	
Final Fantasy Explorers	December 18, 2014	Square Enix	
Kenka Bancho 6: Soul and Blood	January 15, 2015	Spike Chunsoft	
Ace Combat: Assault Horizon Legacy +	January 29, 2015	Bandai Namco Games	
The Legend of Zelda: Majora's Mask 3D	February 13, 2015	Nintendo	
IronFall: Invasion	February 13, 2015	VD-Dev	
Code Name: S.T.E.A.M.	March 13, 2015	Nintendo	
Cube Creator 3D	April 23, 2015	Big John Games	
Touch Battle Tank 3D 3	April 28, 2015	SilverStarJapan	
Super Robot Taisen BX	August 20, 2015	Bandai Namco Games	
The Legend of the Dark Witch 2	November 4, 2015	Flyhigh Works	
Noah no Yurikago	November 18, 2015	SilverStarJapan	
Monster Hunter Generations	November 28, 2015	Capcom	
Metroid Prime: Federation Force	August 19, 2016	Nintendo	
Luigi's Mansion	October 12, 2018	Nintendo	

==== Stand ====
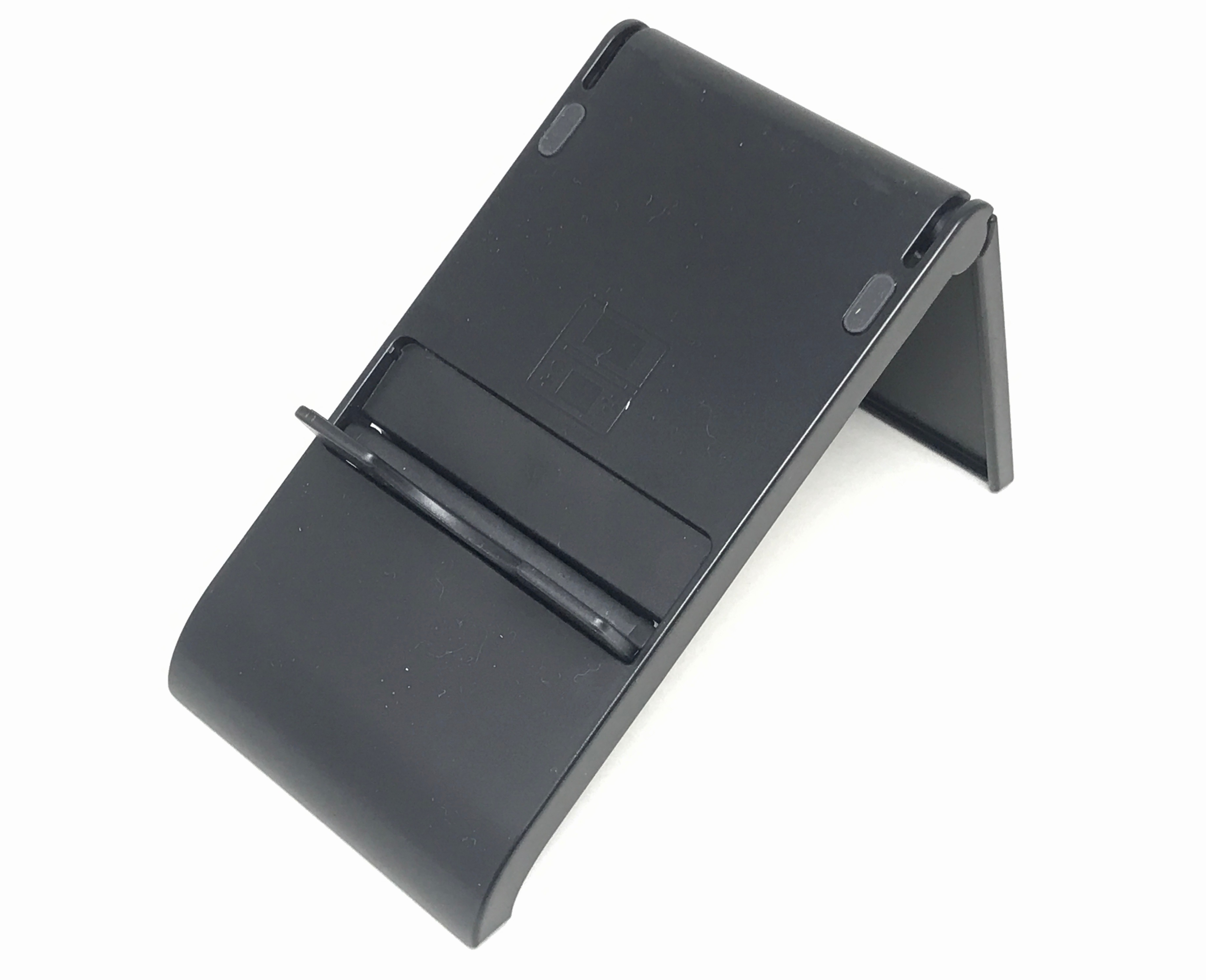
A Nintendo 3DS stand, originally bundled with Kid Icarus: Uprising

This accessory came bundled exclusively with every retail copy of Kid Icarus: Uprising. The stand made the game, and other games with similar controls such as Liberation Maiden, easier to play for various users, as it helped free the tension of suspending the console with one hand since the other hand would be using the stylus on the touch screen for longer periods than usual.

==== NFC Reader/Writer ====
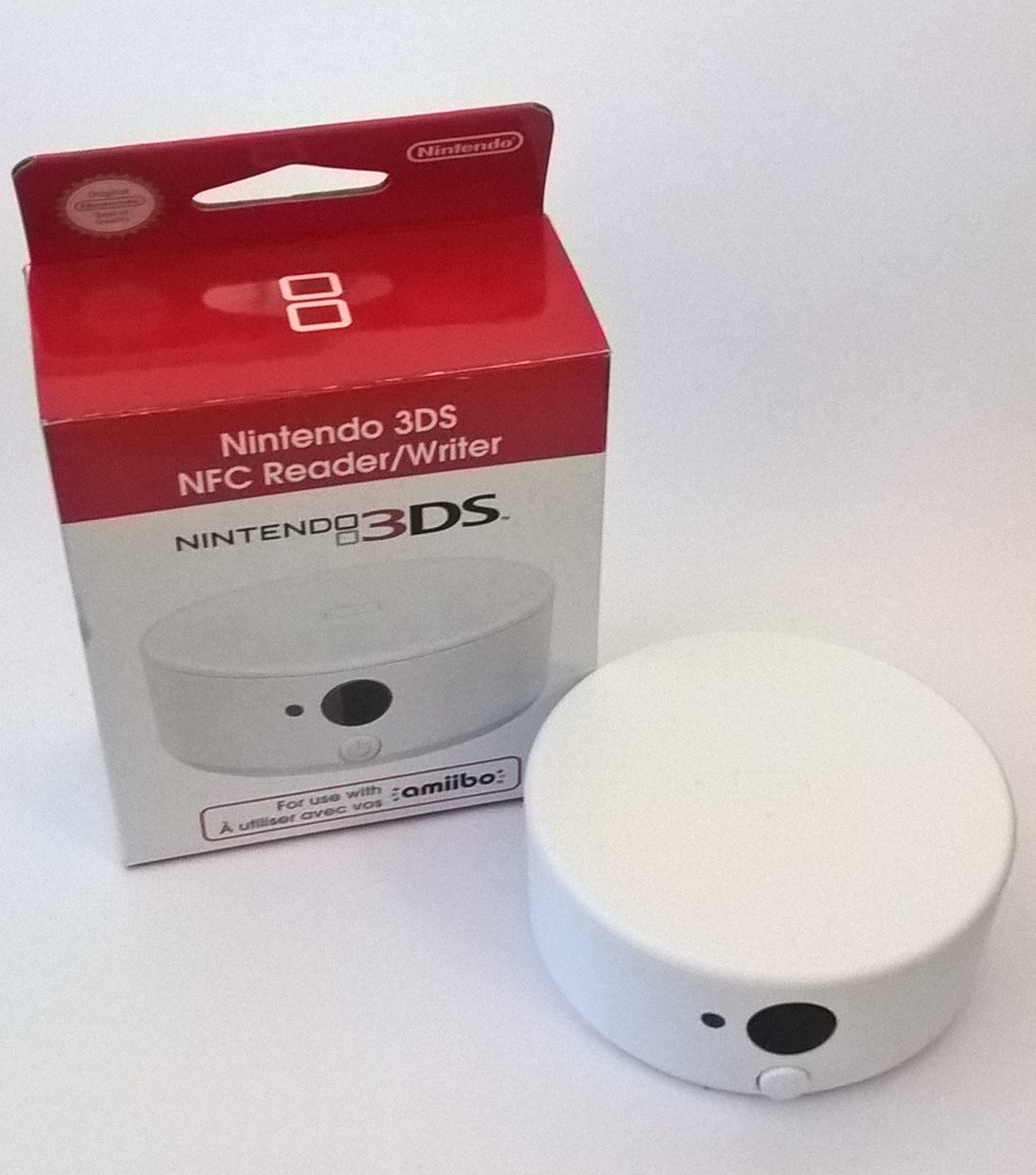
A Nintendo 3DS NFC Reader/Writer, which enabled Amiibo for the 3DS, 3DS XL, and 2DS

A near-field communication (NFC) reader and writer was released on September 25, 2015, in North America at US$19.99 and on October 2 in Europe, alongside Animal Crossing: Happy Home Designer. This peripheral enables Amiibo support for the Nintendo 3DS, 3DS XL, and 2DS, a feature already built-in to New Nintendo 3DS systems. The accessory is powered by two AA batteries.

=== Other models ===
The Nintendo 3DS family consists of six models. Apart from the regular-sized Nintendo 3DS, the Nintendo 3DS XL is a larger model of the console which was released on July 28, 2012, and features 90% larger screens than the original Nintendo 3DS. The Nintendo 2DS is a complete redesign of the handheld which was released on October 12, 2013, and is described as an "entry level" version of the 3DS. This console, while still capable of playing Nintendo DS and 3DS games, removes the 3D functionality and changes the form factor to a fixed, "slate" design. The New Nintendo 3DS, which also has an XL variant, adds additional controls and improved functionality, and is able to play certain games not compatible with the previous models. A cheaper alternative, the New Nintendo 2DS XL, incorporates some of the features from the New Nintendo 3DS with elements from the 2DS such as the lack of stereoscopic 3D functionality; it also shifts from the slate form factor of the original 2DS model to a clamshell design.

==== Nintendo 2DS ====
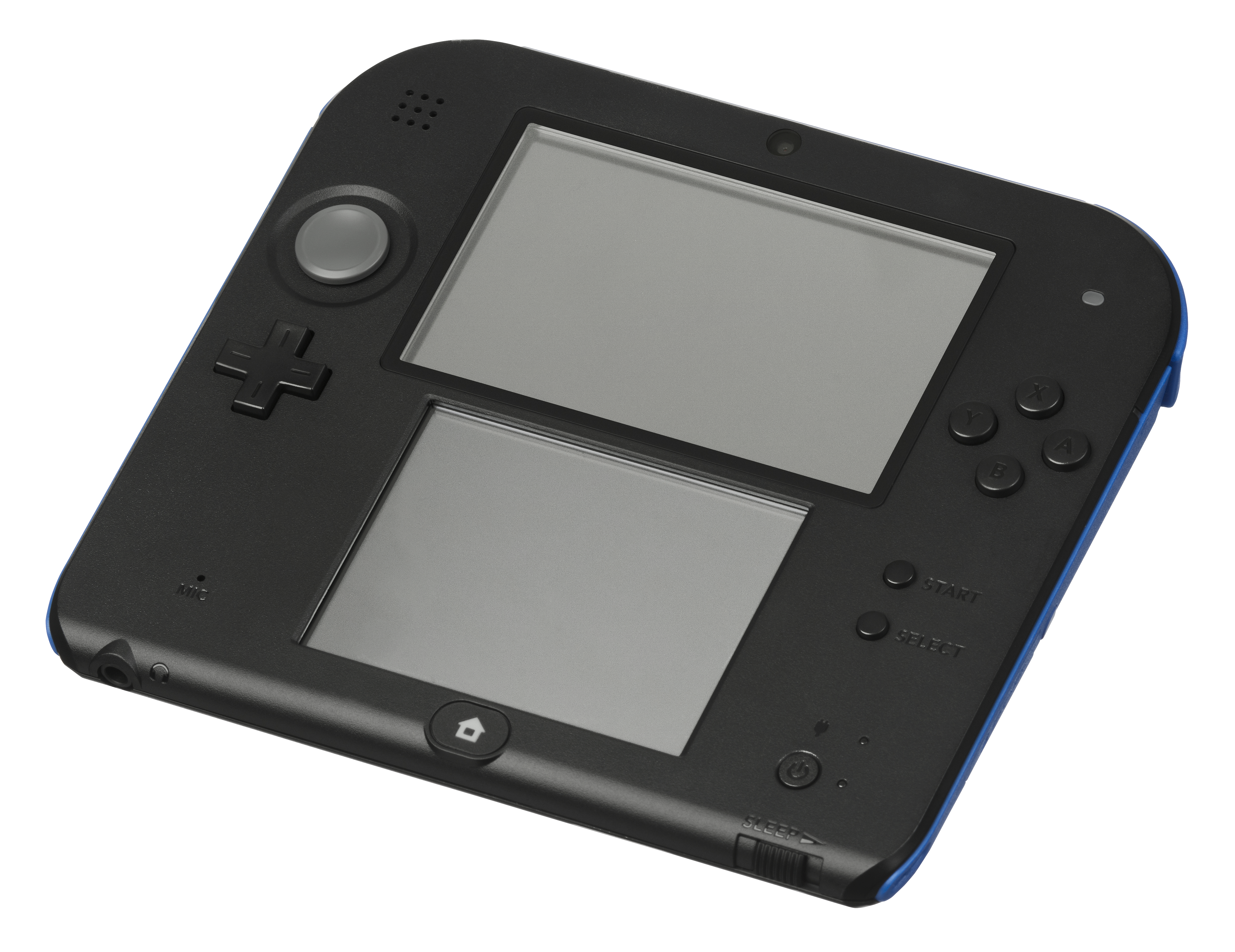
A Black + Blue Nintendo 2DS

The Nintendo 2DS (abbreviated to 2DS) was announced on August 28, 2013, as a new entry-level model of the Nintendo 3DS family. While its hardware and software are relatively similar to the Nintendo 3DS (and still offers compatibility with Nintendo DS and 3DS games), it lacks the 3DS's signature 3D screen, does not have internal stereo speakers (only using a mono speaker), and uses a slate-like form factor as opposed to the clamshell design used by its Nintendo DS and 3DS predecessors. The Nintendo 2DS was released in North America and Europe on October 12, 2013, coinciding with the launch of Pokémon X & Y and was sold alongside the Nintendo 3DS and 3DS XL at a relatively lower price point.

As a cheaper model of the Nintendo 3DS family that plays both Nintendo DS and 3DS games, the Nintendo 2DS was seen as a market strategy to broaden the overall Nintendo handheld gaming market. As such, the 2DS is a handheld console targeted at a different audience than that of the regular Nintendo 3DS models, particularly younger users. Despite concerns from critics who felt that the company was trying to de-emphasize the 3D functionality by releasing the 2DS, Nintendo maintained that 3D is still part of their future plans.

==== New Nintendo 3DS ====
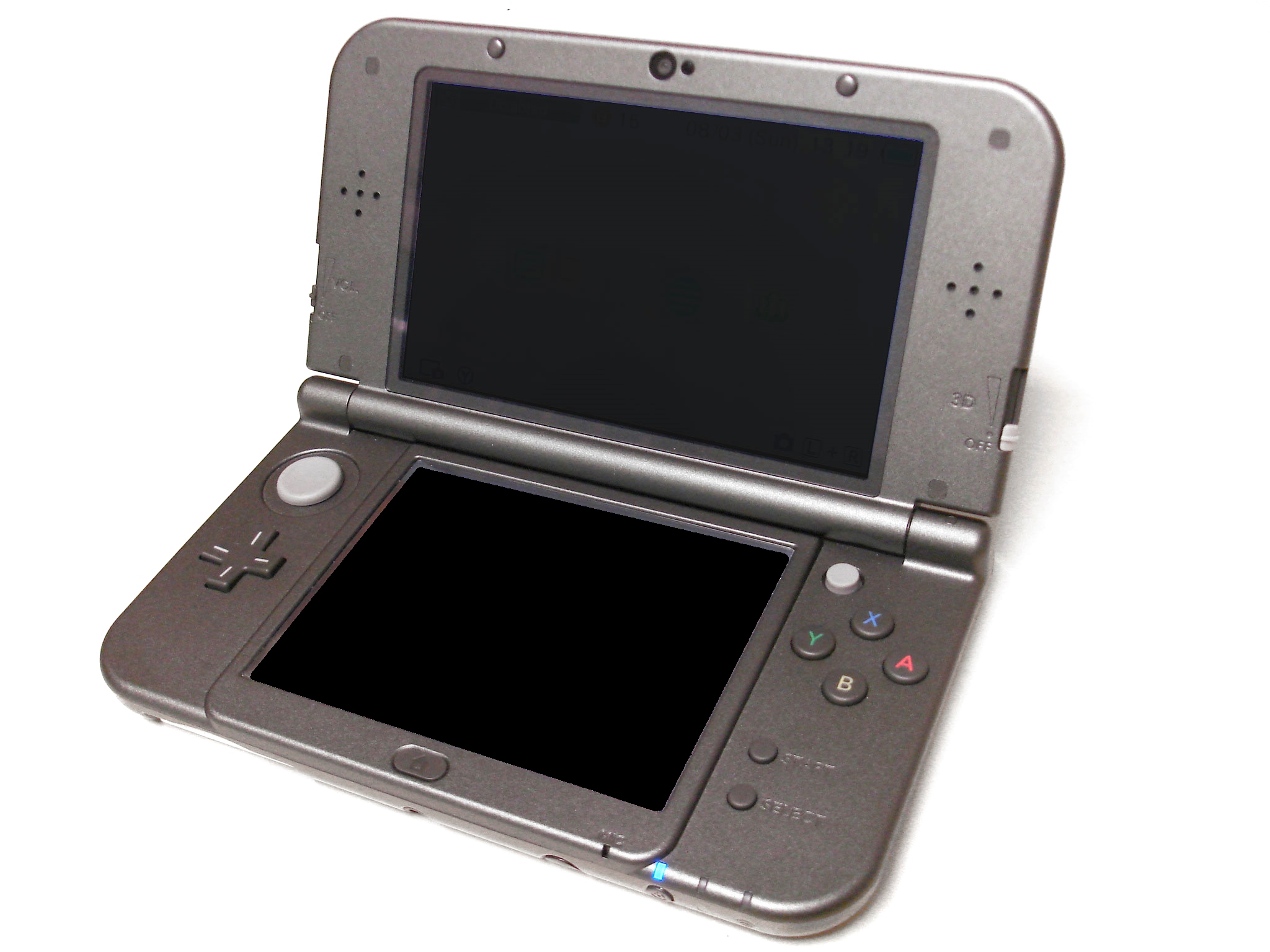
A Metallic Black New Nintendo 3DS XL

The New Nintendo 3DS and New Nintendo 3DS XL (known as New Nintendo 3DS LL in Japan) are updated revisions of the 3DS and 3DS XL that were first unveiled during a Japanese Nintendo Direct presentation on August 29, 2014. The new models feature a more powerful processor, face tracking for improved 3D viewing angles, additional ZL/ZR shoulder buttons and a new "C-Stick" pointing stick that are comparable to and backward compatible with games that support the Circle Pad Pro, colored face buttons inspired by those of Super Famicom controllers, automatic brightness adjustment, microSD storage, larger batteries, and integrated near-field communications support for use with Amiibo products. The regular-sized New Nintendo 3DS also has slightly larger screens than the prior model, and a suite of interchangeable faceplates.

As with its predecessors, the New Nintendo 3DS is compatible with existing DS and 3DS titles. Some software titles, such as Xenoblade Chronicles 3D and Super NES games released for Virtual Console, are specifically optimized for the device and its upgraded processor and are incompatible with the earlier 3DS and 2DS models. certain models use an upgraded ips screen, replacing one or both of the usual screens. however this is not consistant, and there seems to be no pattern to which models get the upgraded screens.

The systems were released in Japan on October 11, 2014, in Australia and New Zealand on November 21, 2014, and at retail in Europe and North America on February 13, 2015. Only the XL version was made available in North America at launch, though the smaller model was later released in a series of limited edition bundles.

==== New Nintendo 2DS XL ====
A Black x Turquoise New Nintendo 2DS XL

On April 27, 2017, Nintendo unveiled the New Nintendo 2DS XL (known as New Nintendo 2DS LL in Japan), which was released in North America and Europe on July 28, 2017 and Japan on July 29, 2017. The system is a variation of the New Nintendo 3DS line, featuring the additional hardware features and software compatibility of the New Nintendo 3DS, albeit without the stereoscopic 3D functionality, and now including an updated micro SD card placement to make it easier to remove, an updated home button and cartridge cover similar to the Nintendo Switch, and a foldable form factor.

== 3DS family comparison table ==
Comparison of Nintendo 3DS family systems
Name	New Nintendo 2DS XL	New Nintendo 3DS XL	New Nintendo 3DS	Nintendo 2DS	Nintendo 3DS XL	Nintendo 3DS
Logo						
Console						
In production	Discontinued (as of September 16, 2020)	Discontinued (as of July 25, 2019)	Discontinued (as of July 13, 2017)	Discontinued (as of September 16, 2020)	Discontinued (as of January 5, 2015)	
Generation	Eighth generation					
Release date	AU: June 15, 2017; JP: July 13, 2017; NA/EU: July 28, 2017	JP: October 11, 2014; AU: November 21, 2014; NA/EU: February 13, 2015	JP: October 25, 2014; AU: November 21, 2014; EU: February 13, 2015; NA: September 25, 2015	WW: October 12, 2013; JP: February 27, 2016	JP/EU: July 28, 2012; NA: August 19, 2012; AU: August 23, 2012	JP: February 26, 2011; EU: March 25, 2011; NA: March 27, 2011; AU: March 31, 2011
Launch price	US$149.99; A$199.99; C$199.99; €149.99; £129.99	¥18,900; US$199.99; A$249.99; C$239.99; €199.99; £179.99	¥16,000; US$219.99; A$219.95; €169.99; £149.99	¥9,980; US$129.99; €129.99; £109.99; A$149.95	¥18,900; US$199.99 €199.99 £179.99; A$249.95	¥25,000; US$249.99 €249.99 £209.99; A$349.95
Current price	Discontinued					
Units shipped	Worldwide: 75.94 million (as of September 30, 2022) includes 60.41 million 3DS and variants, and 12.12 million 2DS and variants					
Best-selling software title	Mario Kart 7, 18.99 million (as of March 31, 2024)					
3D enabled	No	Yes (adjustable depth with Super Stable 3D)		No	Yes (adjustable depth)	
Display	4.88 in (124 mm)	Autostereoscopic (3D) 4.88 in (124 mm)	Autostereoscopic (3D) 3.88 in (99 mm)	3.53 in (90 mm)	Autostereoscopic (3D) 4.88 in (124 mm)	Autostereoscopic (3D) 3.53 in (90 mm)
Display	Upper: 400 × 240 px WQVGA	Upper: 800 × 240 px (400 × 240 WQVGA per eye)		Upper: 400 × 240 px WQVGA	Upper: 800 × 240 px (400 × 240 WQVGA per eye)	
Display	Lower: 320 × 240 QVGA					
Display	approximately 16.77 million colors					
Display	5 brightness levels	5 brightness levels & automatic brightness adjustment		5 brightness levels		
Processor	804 MHz quad-core ARM11 & 134 MHz single-core ARM9			268 MHz dual-core ARM11 & 134 MHz single-core ARM9		
Graphics	268 MHz Digital Media Professionals PICA200					
Memory	256 MB FCRAM @ 6.4 GB/s (64 MB reserved for OS)			128 MB FCRAM @ 3.2 GB/s (32 MB reserved for OS)		
Camera	One front-facing and two outward-facing 0.3 MP (VGA) sensors	One front-facing and two outward-facing 0.3 MP (VGA) sensors Infrared LED light facing the user		One front-facing and two outward-facing 0.3 MP (VGA) sensors		
Storage	4 GB microSDHC card included			4 GB SDHC card included		2 GB SD card included
Physical media	Nintendo 3DS game card (1-8 GB); Nintendo DS game card (8-512 MB)					
Input controls	D-pad; Circle Pad; Analog nub (C-stick); A/B/X/Y, L/R, ZL/ZR, and START/SELECT buttons; Home button; Touchscreen; Microphone; Camera; Motion sensor; Gyro sensor			D-pad; Circle Pad; A/B/X/Y, L/R, and START/SELECT buttons; Home button; Touchscreen; Microphone; Camera; Motion sensor; Gyro sensor	D-pad; Circle Pad (2× with add-on); A/B/X/Y, L/R, and START/SELECT buttons (ZL/ZR buttons with add-on); Home button; Touchscreen; Microphone; Camera; Wireless switch; Motion sensor; Gyro sensor	
Lithium-ion battery	1400 mAh	1750 mAh	1400 mAh	1300 mAh	1750 mAh	1300 mAh
Run time	3.5–7 hours (determined by screen brightness, Wi-Fi, and sound volume)	3.5–7 hours (determined by screen brightness, Wi-Fi, sound volume, and 3D effect)	3.5–6 hours (determined by screen brightness, Wi-Fi, sound volume, and 3D effect)	3.5–5.5 hours (determined by screen brightness, Wi-Fi and sound volume)	3–5 hours (determined by screen brightness, Wi-Fi, sound volume, and 3D effect)	3.5–6.5 hours (determined by screen brightness, Wi-Fi, sound volume, and 3D effect)
Connectivity	Integrated 802.11b/g; IR transceiver; NFC reader for Amiibo			Integrated 802.11b/g; IR transceiver; NFC reader for Amiibo (with add-on)		
Stylus length	69 mm (2.7 in)	86 mm (3.4 in)	76.5 mm (3.01 in)	96 mm (3.8 in)	96 mm (3.8 in)	Extendable up to 100 mm (3.9 in)
Weight	260 g (9.2 oz)	329 g (11.6 oz)	253 g (8.9 oz)	260 g (9.2 oz)	336 g (11.9 oz)	235 g (8.3 oz)
Dimensions	159.36 mm (6.27 in) W 86.36 mm (3.4 in) D 20.8 mm (0.81 in) H	160 mm (6.3 in) W 93.5 mm (3.68 in) D 21.5 mm (0.85 in) H	142 mm (5.6 in) W 80.6 mm (3.17 in) D 21.6 mm (0.85 in) H	144 mm (5.7 in) W 127 mm (5.0 in) D 20.3 mm (0.80 in) H	156 mm (6.1 in) W 93 mm (3.7 in) D 22 mm (0.87 in) H	134 mm (5.3 in) W 74 mm (2.9 in) D 22 mm (0.87 in) H
Online services	Nintendo Network: Nintendo eShop (Discontinued); Nintendo Wi-Fi Connection (Discontinued); Miiverse (Discontinued); Nintendo Video (Discontinued); Swapnote (Nintendo Letter Box in PAL region) (Discontinued); StreetPass Mii Plaza (local & online players met); SpotPass and StreetPass (SpotPass Discontinued); Nintendo Network ID (Discontinued)					
Preloaded applications	Health & Safety Information; Nintendo 3DS / DS Game Card launcher; Nintendo 3DS Camera (photo and video recording and editing); Nintendo 3DS Sound; Nintendo eShop; Mii Maker; StreetPass Mii Plaza; AR Games; Face Raiders; Activity Log; Nintendo Zone (select regions only); Nintendo Video; Swapnote (Nintendo Letter Box in PAL region); Eurosport (select regions only); Netflix (select regions only, with paid subscription); YouTube; Hulu Plus (select regions only, with paid subscription); 3DS/DS Download Play; System Settings; Game Notes; Friend List; Notifications; Internet Browser					
Regional lockout	Yes					
Backward compatibility	Physical only Nintendo Game Cards Nintendo DS/DSi Game Card Downloadable only: DSiWare; Virtual Console; Game Boy; Game Boy Color; Super Nintendo Entertainment System; Game Boy Advance (Available through the Nintendo 3DS Ambassador Program only); Game Gear; PC Engine (Available in Japan only); Nintendo Entertainment System			Physical only Nintendo Game Cards Nintendo DS/DSi Game Card Downloadable only: DSiWare; Virtual Console; Game Boy; Game Boy Color; Game Boy Advance (Available through the Nintendo 3DS Ambassador Program only); Game Gear; PC Engine (Available in Japan only); Nintendo Entertainment System		

== Software ==
=== Operating system ===
The Home Menu is a graphical user interface similar to the Nintendo DSi Menu and Wii U Menu for Nintendo 3DS systems. It is used to launch software stored on Nintendo DS and Nintendo 3DS Game Cards, applications installed on a SD card, and DSiWare titles installed in the system's internal memory. Application icons are set in a customizable grid navigable on the lower screen. On the upper screen, a special 3D animated logo is displayed for each individual app, as well as system information such as wireless signal strength, date and time, and battery life. Using the Home button, users can suspend the current software that is running and bring up the Home Menu, allowing the user to launch certain multitasking applications, such as the Internet Browser and Miiverse.

Similarly to the Nintendo DSi, the menu has updateable firmware. On April 25, 2012, a system update brought the introduction of a folder system, which allows users to put applications inside folders. On June 20, 2013, a system update brought the introduction of the Save Data Backup feature, which allows the user to back up save data from downloadable Nintendo 3DS software and most Virtual Console games. An update was released on October 30, 2014, to enable players to download custom themes for the Home Menu, based on various Nintendo titles.

=== Camera ===
A portrait photograph taken with the Nintendo 3DS Camera.

Nintendo 3DS Camera is a built-in photo and video recorder with an integrated media gallery and photo editing functionality. The app uses the system's two front-facing cameras to take 3D or 2D photos, and the user-facing camera to take regular 2D photos. All photographs are taken at a resolution of 640 × 480 px (VGA), or 0.3 megapixels. The two perspectives of 3D photographs are stored into two separate files, with JPG and MPO extensions.

There are various options and filters available when taking photos or recording video. There is also a Low-Light option, which is useful when taking photos and recording video in low lighting conditions. There is a loud shutter sound that happens when you take photos, which cannot be turned down or off, likely to comply with Japan's mandatory shutter sound.

On December 7, 2011, a system update added the ability to record 3D video along special recording options, such as the ability to make stop motion animations. All recording modes only allow a single video to be up to 10 minutes long.

=== Sound ===
Nintendo 3DS Sound is a built-in music player and sound recorder. Supported filename extensions include MP3 audio with .mp3 and AAC audio with .mp4, .m4a, or .3GP. Audio files can be played from an SD card, with visualizations displayed on the upper screen. Music can be played while the console is closed, using the system's headphone jack. A set of sound manipulation options are available, as well as several audio filters. Ten-second voice recordings can also be recorded and edited. There is also a StreetPass function built-into the app, where users exchange song data to make a compatibility chart between them.

=== Nintendo eShop ===
Nintendo eShop is the Nintendo 3DS's online software distribution service. Launched in June 2011, the eShop provides downloadable retail and download-only Nintendo 3DS titles, Virtual Console titles, and various applications and videos. It also allows users to purchase downloadable content (DLC) and automatically download patches for both physical and downloadable games. All content obtained from Nintendo eShop is attached to a Nintendo Network ID but can only be used in one system. Background downloading is possible via SpotPass, while playing games or in sleep mode. Up to ten downloads can be queued at a time and their status can be checked on the Home Menu.

Certain Latin American and Caribbean countries, which feature a more limited eShop, had their systems closed in July 2020. Countries in the region with the full eShop and the rest of the world were unaffected.

It was later announced on February 15, 2022, that support for Nintendo eShop for the Nintendo 3DS for the rest of the world would be discontinued in late March 2023 (this was confirmed to be March 27, 2023), with the ability to add credit cards ceasing by May 23, 2022, followed by the inability to add funds by August 29, 2022.

=== Miiverse ===
Miiverse was an integrated social networking service, which allowed players to interact and share their gaming experiences through their personal Mii characters. It was originally launched on Wii U and was launched on the Nintendo 3DS on December 11, 2013, via a firmware update. Its functionality was similar to the Wii U version albeit without the private messaging feature, and required a Nintendo Network ID.

Miiverse allowed users to seamlessly share accomplishments, comments, hand written notes, and game screenshots with other players on various communities specific to their games and applications. It was possible to access Wii U communities on the Nintendo 3DS and vice versa. It was also possible to access Miiverse on any internet enabled smartphone, tablet and PC. The service was moderated through software filtering as well as a human resource team in order to ensure that the content shared by users was appropriate and that no spoilers were shared. It was also possible to post screenshots from certain games to social networking websites such as Twitter, Tumblr and/or Facebook via the Nintendo 3DS Image Share service.

On November 7, 2017, the Miiverse servers closed down for the 3DS and the Wii U.

=== Internet browser ===
The Nintendo 3DS's internet browser was released via a firmware update on June 6, 2011, in North America and June 7, 2011, in Europe and Japan. It functions as a multitasking system application and can be used while another application is suspended in the background. The browser supports HTML, CSS, JavaScript and some HTML5 elements but does not support Flash, video or music. It can also download and show 3D images with the .mpo file extension and allows users to save images on an SD card. Additionally the browser supports JPEG and MPO image uploads from the system's photo gallery. The New 3DS internet browser has a hidden breakout clone mini-game accessed by tapping the rhythm of the Super Mario Bros. theme on the new tab page.

=== Video services ===
Nintendo Video launched in Australia, Europe, and Japan on July 13, 2011, and in North America on July 21, 2011, along with a tutorial video. The service periodically updates its video content availability through SpotPass, automatically adding and deleting content from the console. Up to four videos can be available through the app at the same time. Nintendo Video content include: established series such as Oscar's Oasis and Shaun the Sheep (with fifteen exclusive episodes); original series such as Dinosaur Office and BearShark by CollegeHumor; short films; movie trailers; and sports videos by Redbull and BSkyB. The Nintendo Video app was discontinued in the Japanese, European and Oceania regions by April 2014, and in North America by July 2015. In North America at least, the "Nintendo Video" name continues to exist via a permanent Nintendo eShop category for all hosted videos that previously featured on the former app, as well as potential new content. The permanently hosted online "Nintendo Video" eShop videos can be viewed on-demand at any time without additional costs.

The Netflix streaming video service was released in North America on July 14, 2011. Netflix users are able to pause streaming video on the Nintendo 3DS and resume it on other Netflix-enabled devices. Only 2D content is available through the service. The Netflix app was discontinued on June 30, 2021. Nintendo announced on October 21, 2011, that Hulu Plus would be released on the Nintendo 3DS by the end of the year. On February 16, 2012, following the debut of Hulu on the Wii, Nintendo reiterated the announcement this time claiming it would be available on the 3DS sometime in 2012. Finally, on August 6, 2013, the Hulu application became available in Japan and on October 17, 2013, the Hulu Plus application was launched in North America, along with a one-week free trial. On November 29, 2013, the YouTube application was released for the Nintendo 3DS in Europe and North America. It was discontinued in August 2019.

The SpotPass TV service launched in Japan on June 19, 2011. The service was a joint service between Nippon TV and Fuji TV that brought free 3D video content to Nintendo 3DS users in Japan. Types of content included programming teaching the user how to do magic tricks, Japanese idol sumo wrestling, sports, and 3D dating, among others. The service was terminated on June 20, 2012, a year after its inception. A Eurosport app launched in Europe and Australia on December 15, 2011, and worked similarly to the Nintendo Video app. It featured weekly episodes of Watts Zap and other compilation videos containing Eurosport content. The service was terminated on December 31, 2012, a year after its inception.

=== Swapnote ===
Swapnote (known as Nintendo Letter Box in Europe and Australia) is a messaging application for the Nintendo 3DS. Swapnote was released on December 21, 2011, in Japan and on December 22 in Europe, Australia and North America, via the Nintendo eShop. The application is free and is pre-installed on newer systems. It allows users to send hand-written/drawn messages to registered friends via SpotPass either or other users via StreetPass. The app also allows users to freely embed pictures and sounds into their messages.

On October 31, 2013, Nintendo abruptly suspended the Swapnote/Nintendo Letter Box SpotPass functionality after discovering minors were sharing Friend Codes with strangers who had exploited the messaging service to allegedly exchange pornographic imagery.

=== Mii Maker ===
Mii Maker is a system application that allows users to create Mii characters through either a selection of facial and body features, such as the nose, mouth, eyes, hair, among other, or by taking a photo using the system's cameras and auto-generate a personal Mii. Mii characters can also be added and shared by reading special QR codes with one of the cameras. It is also possible to import Mii characters from a Wii or a Wii U system. However, Mii created on Nintendo 3DS systems cannot be exported back to a Wii due to the addition of character parts in Mii Maker not present on the Wii's Mii Channel. This restriction, however, is not applied when exporting a Mii from a Nintendo 3DS to a Wii U system.

=== Activity Log ===
Activity Log is a system application that tracks a record of which games have been played and for how long. Additionally, it functions as a pedometer. The feature encourages walking every day with the system in order to earn Play Coins, at a maximum of 10 each day at a rate of one per 100 steps, to a total of 300 coins. Play Coins can then be used with compatible games and applications to acquire special content and a variety of other benefits.

=== Other network features ===
Other network features of the Nintendo 3DS include the Nintendo Network, SpotPass and StreetPass. StreetPass Mii Plaza is a StreetPass application which comes pre-installed on every Nintendo 3DS system, while Nintendo Zone Viewer is a built-in application that detects and makes use of certified SpotPass hotspots. The service has since been discontinued. The Nintendo Network online service has been discontinued as of April 8, 2024, marking an end for most of the online features of the 3DS, including SpotPass and online multiplayer.

== Games ==
Retail copies of games are supplied on proprietary cartridges called Nintendo 3DS Game Cards, which are packaged in keep cases with simple instructions. In Europe, the boxes have a triangle at the bottom corner of the paper sleeve-insert side. The triangle is color-coded to identify the region for which the title is intended and which manual languages are included. Unlike with previous Nintendo consoles, the complete software manual is only available digitally via the system's Home Menu. Software published by Nintendo and by some third parties come packaged with Club Nintendo points, which can be redeemed for special rewards. Retail and download-only games are also available for download in the Nintendo eShop. All Nintendo 3DS consoles are region locked (software purchased in a region can be only played on that region's hardware).

A total of 392.14 million Nintendo 3DS games have been sold worldwide as of December 31, 2024, with 59 titles surpassing the million-unit mark. The most successful game, Mario Kart 7, has sold 18.99 million units worldwide.

=== Launch titles ===
The Nintendo 3DS launched in Japan with 8 games, in North America with 12 games and in Europe with 14 games. An additional thirty games were announced for release during the system's "launch window", which includes the three months after the system's launch date.

List of Nintendo 3DS launch titles by region released
Launch title	JP	NA	EU	AU
Asphalt 3D	No	Yes	Yes	Yes
Bust-a-Move Universe	Yes	Yes	No	No
Combat of Giants: Dinosaurs 3D	Yes	Yes	Yes	Yes
Lego Star Wars III: The Clone Wars	No	Yes	Yes	Yes
Madden NFL Football	No	Yes	No	No
Nintendogs + Cats	Yes	Yes	Yes	Yes
Pilotwings Resort	No	Yes	Yes	No
Pro Evolution Soccer 2011 3D	Yes	Yes	Yes	Yes
Professor Layton and the Miracle Mask	Yes	No	No	No
Rayman 3D	No	Yes	Yes	Yes
Ridge Racer 3D	Yes	Yes	Yes	Yes
Samurai Warriors: Chronicles	Yes	Yes	Yes	No
The Sims 3	No	Yes	Yes	Yes
Steel Diver	No	Yes	No	No
Super Monkey Ball 3D	No	Yes	Yes	Yes
Super Street Fighter IV: 3D Edition	Yes	Yes	Yes	Yes
Tom Clancy's Ghost Recon: Shadow Wars	No	Yes	Yes	Yes
Tom Clancy's Splinter Cell 3D	No	No	Yes	Yes

=== Augmented reality ===
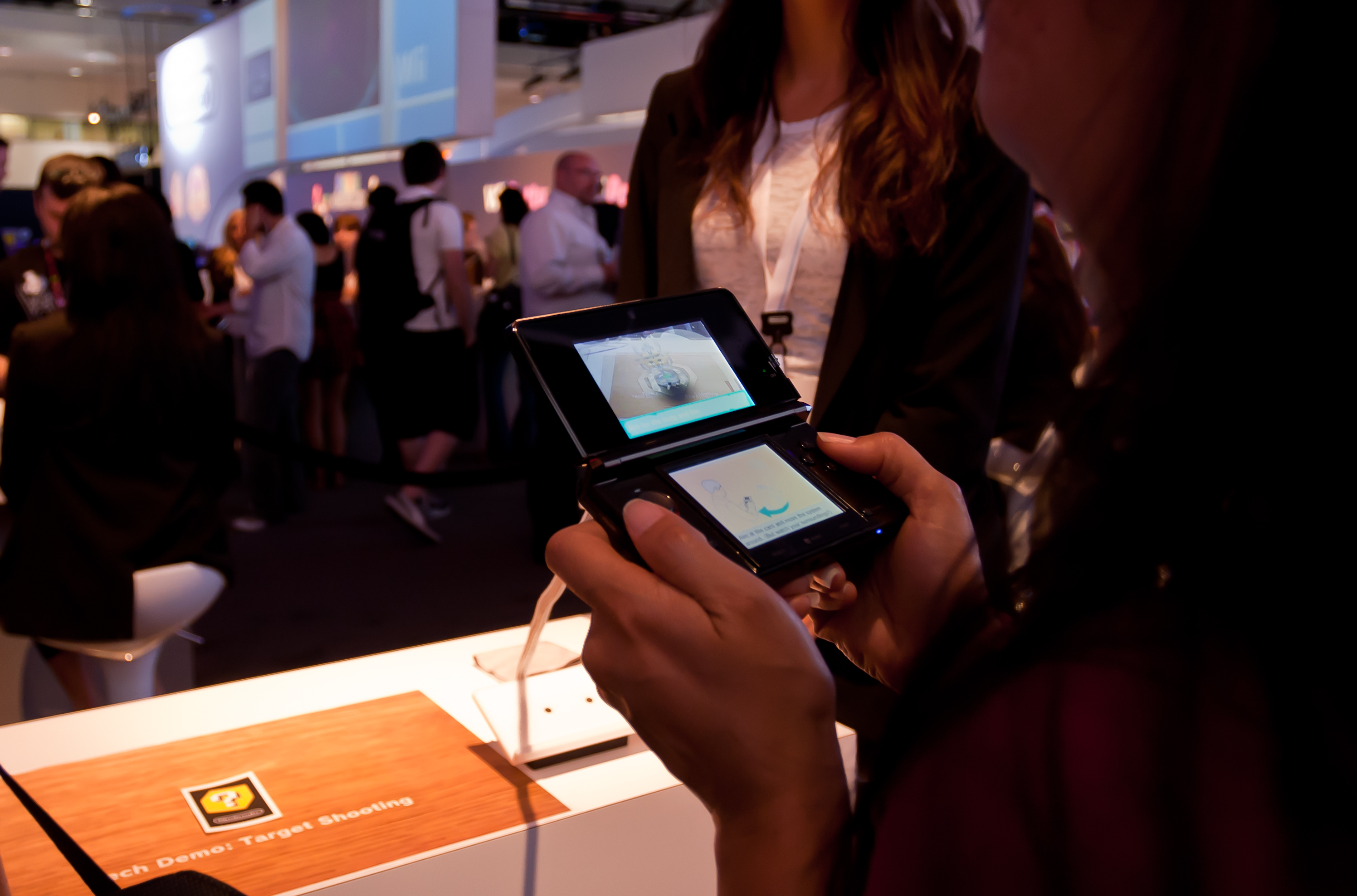
An augmented reality tech demo called Target Shooting, as seen at E3 2010

AR Games is a compilation of several augmented reality mini-games and simple tools, which is pre-installed on every Nintendo 3DS, along with six paper cards that interact with certain games. Five of the six cards have a picture of a character on them, consisting of Mario, Link, Kirby, Pikmin, and Samus. The sixth one is a question mark box from the Super Mario Bros. series. Nintendo has also published downloadable versions of this card in larger sizes. By scanning the cards, real time graphics are augmented onto live footage. It is also possible to take 3D photos of Nintendo characters, using any to all 6 AR Cards, as well as their Miis.

Some AR cards are also compatible with other Nintendo 3DS games including Nintendogs + Cats, Kid Icarus: Uprising, Pokédex 3D Pro, Freakyforms: Your Creations, Alive!, and Tetris: Axis.

Face Raiders is another augmented reality application pre-installed on every Nintendo 3DS system. In order to start playing, the user must take pictures of peoples' faces. These faces then turn into enemies and attack the player, who must shoot them using the system's gyroscope. The background of the game is the rear camera's viewpoint. As people walk by in the background, the game takes their pictures from their faces, also adding them as enemies. It is also possible to collect faces from the system's image gallery, which is searched automatically for faces.

There are other Nintendo 3DS applications that similarly use the system's AR capabilities, such as Photos with Mario, Photos with Animal Crossing, Pokémon Dream Radar, and Spirit Camera: The Cursed Memoir.

=== Download Play ===
Download Play allows users to play local multiplayer games with other Nintendo 3DS systems using only one Game Card. Players must have their systems within wireless range (up to approximately 65 feet) of each other for the guest system to download the necessary data from the host system. Download Play on Nintendo 3DS systems is also backward compatible, meaning that it is also available for Nintendo DS games. Unlike Download Play on Nintendo DS, game data is stored on the system's SD card once downloaded to the guest system, no longer requiring a re-download for a future game session. Nintendo 3DS games can only transfer a maximum of 32 MB of data to other systems while in download play. Other forms of local multiplayer modes require each player to own the software that is currently being used.

=== Backward compatibility ===
In addition to its own software, the Nintendo 3DS is backward compatible with all Nintendo DS and Nintendo DSi software. Like the DSi and DSi XL, the Nintendo 3DS is incompatible with DS software that requires use of the Game Boy Advance port. Nintendo DS and DSi software cannot be played with 3D visuals on the 3DS. The original DS display resolutions are displayed in a scaled and stretched fashion due to the increased resolution of the 3DS's screens. If the user holds down the START or SELECT buttons upon launching Nintendo DS software, the emulated screens will be displayed in the Nintendo DS's native resolution, albeit smaller with black borders. On the Nintendo 3DS XL, this method yields a viewing size for DS games similar to their native sizes (due to the larger screen size of the XL), unlike on the original 3DS models, where the games appear to be shrunk.

==== Virtual Console ====
The Virtual Console service allows Nintendo 3DS owners to download and play games originally released for the Game Boy, Game Boy Color, Game Gear, Nintendo Entertainment System, and exclusively for the New Nintendo 3DS models, Super Nintendo Entertainment System. Virtual Console games are distributed over broadband Internet via the Nintendo eShop, and are saved to a removable SD card. Once downloaded, Virtual Console games can be accessed from the Home Menu as individual apps. The service was launched on June 6 in North America and June 7, 2011, in Japan and Europe as part of a system update.

Nintendo and Sega also launched the 3D Classics series, a selection of enhanced retro games for the Nintendo 3DS featuring updated stereoscopic graphics.

=== Louvre ===
Beginning in 2012, the Louvre in Paris utilized Nintendo 3DS systems to provide audioguides. The following year, the museum contracted Nintendo to create a 3DS-based audiovisual visitor guide. Titled Nintendo 3DS Guide: Louvre, this guide contains over 30 hours of audio and over 1,000 photographs of artwork and the museum itself, including 3D views, and also provides navigation thanks to differential GPS transmitters installed within the museum. 3DS XLs pre-loaded with the guide are available to rent at the museum, and the software can also be purchased from the Nintendo eShop. Unlike most 3DS titles, the guide is not region locked.

The upgraded 2013 Louvre guide was also announced in a special Nintendo Direct featuring Satoru Iwata and Shigeru Miyamoto at the museum demonstrating the guide's features, including while visiting a number of the works that the museum is most known for such as the Venus de Milo, the Winged Victory of Samothrace and the Mona Lisa.

The Louvre retired the 3DS guides in September 2025.

== Reception ==
The Nintendo 3DS hardware has received largely positive reviews. IGN called its hardware design a "natural evolution of the Nintendo DSi system." CNET praised the device's 3D effect, while IGN called it "impressively sharp and clean", and impressively superior to its predecessors, although it was noted that the 3D effect only worked if the system was held at the right distance and angle. A common complaint was the 3DS's short battery life; Engadget reported to get 3 hours of battery life from the system, while IGN reported 2 to 4.5 hours of play.

The Nintendo 3DS XL was very well received at launch. Reviewers generally recommended the console to new buyers of the Nintendo 3DS family, although not so much to current owners of a Nintendo 3DS. Kotaku mentioned it as "possibly the best portable gaming device ever...[and] a well-designed machine..." and that "it plays great games" while The Verge called it "the best portable gaming buy around right now." The Nintendo 3DS XL improves upon the battery life of the original 3DS. Kotaku claimed that the Nintendo 3DS XL's battery "lasts a cross-country flight.". Sam Byford of The Verge noted that the larger top screen makes more obvious problems with aliasing and low-resolution textures. He did, however, say that the 3D felt more immersive: "Where the 3DS felt like peering through a peephole into another world, the XL is almost like stepping through a door." On the other hand, Destructoid said the 3D effect on the XL was more subtle than on its predecessor. The Verge spoke positively of the build quality and design choices, saying the console improved on the original. A Destructoid reviewer said the 3DS XL was easier to use than the regular Nintendo 3DS, mainly due to their large hands. The Verge noted lowered sound quality from the original, the result of smaller speakers. Both The Verge and Gizmodo complained of low-quality cameras.

=== Sales ===
Life-to-date number of units shipped, in millions (all models combined)
Date	Japan	America	Other	Total	Increase
2011-03-31	1.06	1.32	1.23	3.61	—N/a
2011-06-30	1.27	1.43	1.63	4.32	19.67%
2011-09-30	2.13	2.13	2.42	6.68	54.63%
2011-12-31	4.66	5.47	4.91	15.03	125%
2012-03-31	5.85	5.99	5.30	17.13	13.97%
2012-06-30	6.76	6.41	5.82	19.00	10.92%
2012-09-30	7.94	7.38	6.88	22.19	16.79%
2012-12-31	10.88	9.97	8.99	29.84	34.47%
2013-03-31	11.54	10.26	9.29	31.09	4.19%
2013-06-30	12.18	10.62	9.69	32.48	4.47%
2013-09-30	13.33	11.43	10.22	34.98	7.7%
2013-12-31	15.76	14.36	12.62	42.74	22.18%
2014-03-31	15.89	14.59	12.85	43.33	1.38%
2014-06-30	16.15	14.83	13.16	44.14	1.87%
2014-09-30	16.61	15.27	13.54	45.42	2.9%
2014-12-31	18.70	16.77	14.93	50.41	10.99%
2015-03-31	18.96	17.51	15.58	52.06	1.33%
2015-06-30	19.25	17.91	15.90	53.07	1.94%
2015-09-30	19.79	18.27	16.29	54.34	2.39%
2015-12-31	20.97	19.50	17.47	57.94	6.62%
2016-03-31	21.32	19.76	17.77	58.85	1.57%
2016-06-30	21.63	20.11	18.05	59.79	1.6%
2016-09-30	22.14	20.73	18.69	61.57	2.98%
2016-12-31	23.13	21.96	20.21	65.30	6.05%
2017-03-31	23.31	22.32	20.50	66.12	1.26%
2017-06-30	23.54	22.73	20.80	67.08	1.45%
2017-09-30	24.07	23.49	21.42	68.98	2.83%
2017-12-31	24.63	24.88	22.48	71.99	4.36%
2018-03-31	24.70	25.17	22.66	72.53	0.75%
2018-06-30	24.76	25.37	22.76	72.89	0.5%
2018-09-30	24.93	25.67	22.92	73.53	0.88%
2018-12-31	25.15	26.35	23.34	74.84	1.78%
2019-03-31	25.18	26.45	23.46	75.08	0.32%
2019-06-30	25.20	26.54	23.54	75.28	0.27%
2019-09-30	25.22	26.62	23.61	75.45	0.23%
2019-12-31	25.24	26.72	23.75	75.71	0.34%
2020-03-31	25.26	26.73	23.78	75.77	0.08%
2020-06-30	25.26	26.83	23.78	75.87	0.13%
2020-09-30	25.26	26.90	23.78	75.94	0.09%

==== Pre-launch ====
Prior to its launch, Amazon UK announced that the Nintendo 3DS was their most pre-ordered video game system ever. Nintendo of America announced that the number of pre-orders were double the number of pre-orders for the Wii.

==== Launch ====
The system launched in Japan on February 26, 2011, and sold its entire allotment of 400,000 Nintendo 3DS units during its release, amid reports of major queues outside retailers and pre-order sellouts. On March 25, 2011, the system launched in Europe, selling 303,000 units during its first two days of its release. In the UK 113,000 3DS units were sold during its opening weekend, making it Nintendo's most successful hardware launch in the country to this day. According to the NPD Group, Nintendo sold just under 500,000 Nintendo 3DS units during the month of March 2011 in the US, with 440,000 Nintendo 3DS units sold in its first week of release. As of March 31, 2011, the 3DS had sold 3.61 million units, short of the 4 million Nintendo projected. The Nintendo 3DS is also the fastest selling console in Australia, with 200,000 units sold through 37 weeks of availability.

==== Price cut ====
Following the system's price cut of almost one third of its original price by the second quarter of 2011, sales saw an increase of more than 260 percent during the comparable 19-day time period in July. About 185,000 units were sold following a price cut on August 12. Nintendo sold more than 235,000 Nintendo 3DS systems in the United States in August, being the second best-selling dedicated game system for the month.

Approximately 8 months after its release, Nintendo of America announced that sales of the Nintendo 3DS had surpassed the original Nintendo DS in its first year, which was approximately 2.37 million units sold. During the 2011 holiday season, the Nintendo 3DS sold approximately 1.6 million units in Japan. By the end of 2011, Nintendo 3DS sales reached 4 million units sold in the United States. Overall, Nintendo sold 11.4 million Nintendo 3DS units worldwide, in 2011.

==== Subsequent sales ====
On September 30, 2013, Nintendo president Satoru Iwata announced that the Nintendo 3DS had sold more than 5 million units in Japan during the year of 2013. This mark was only surpassed by its predecessor, the Nintendo DS.

Following the launch of the Nintendo 2DS, Nintendo sold 452,000 units of the Nintendo 3DS family in the United States, during the month of October, double the previous month's sales. As such, it achieved its sixth consecutive month as the best-selling video game console in the US. Total Nintendo 3DS first-party software sales for the month hit more than 2 million units, the highest since December 2011. North American retailer Target reported that the Nintendo 3DS XL was among its top-sellers during the Black Friday. On November 29, 2013, Nintendo of France deputy general manager Philippe Lavoué announced that Nintendo 3DS life-to-date hardware sales stand at 2.15 million units in France, in which 30 percent account for Nintendo 2DS sales. It was also announced that the 3DS possesses a market share of 50 percent of all video game systems sold, and that Nintendo 3DS software sales rose from 850,000 to 1,700,000 year-over-year in the region. According to the NPD Group, Nintendo sold around 770,000 units of the Nintendo 3DS family in November in North America, pushing the lifetime to nearly 10.5 million units in the region. On December 19, 2013, MCV reported that lifetime Nintendo 3DS family sales in the United Kingdom had hit 2 million units, making it the best-selling console of the year in the region.

By January 2014, Nintendo had sold 900,000 units in Spain. The fourth quarter of 2014 saw the release of the New Nintendo 3DS in Japan and Australia. Although having upgraded hardware, a few exclusive titles, and being capable of running Super NES games for the Virtual Console, it is not treated as a new generation of console. It is considered to be part of the 3DS family, and is therefore included in these sales figures.

The first quarter of 2015 saw the release of the New Nintendo 3DS, part of the 3DS family and thus counted among these sales figures, in Europe and North America.

As of September 30, 2022, Nintendo reports 75.94 million units have been shipped worldwide, of which 25.26 million were shipped to Japan, 26.90 million were shipped to the Americas, and 23.78 million were shipped to other territories including Europe.

=== Health concerns ===
Nintendo has publicly stated that the 3D mode of the Nintendo 3DS is not intended for use by children ages six and younger, citing possible harm to their vision. Nintendo suggests that younger players use the device's 2D mode instead, although the American Optometric Association has assured parents that 3D gaming in moderation would not be harmful for children. Additionally, the 3DS may help in screening children before the age of 6 who have depth related vision problems according to Dr. Michael Duenas, associate director for health sciences and policy for the American Optometric Association, and Dr. Joe Ellis, the president of the optometrists' association. However, Dr. David Hunter, a pediatric ophthalmologist affiliated with the American Academy of Ophthalmology believes that it is largely speculative whether a child who has problems perceiving depth in real life would react to a 3DS in any way that parents would recognize as indicating any problems with depth perception. Duenas asserted that Nintendo's vague warning that "there is a possibility that 3-D images which send different images to the left and right eye could affect the development of vision in small children," was not specifically backed up by any scientific evidence, and that it was motivated by preventing possible liability rather than safeguarding against realistic harm.

The system's parental controls, safeguarded by a PIN, allow parents to disable autostereoscopic effects on systems intended for use by young children. Playing games in 3D has been suspected of causing headaches among some gamers.

Nintendo of America's then-president Reggie Fils-Aimé partially cited these concerns as one of the influences on the creation of the Nintendo 2DS, an entry-level version of the Nintendo 3DS system lacking 3D functionality.

== Legal issues ==
In 2011, 58-year-old former Sony employee Seijiro Tomita sued Nintendo for infringing a patent on the 3D screen that obviates the need for 3D glasses. On March 13, 2013, a United States federal jury ordered Nintendo to pay him US$30.2 million in damages. However, on August 7, 2013, that amount was reduced by 50% to US$15.1 million because the initial figure was, according to Judge Jed Rakoff, a federal judge, "intrinsically excessive" and "unsupported by the evidence presented at trial." On December 11, 2013, it was decided by Judge Rakoff that Nintendo pay 1.82% of the wholesale price of each unit sold to Tomita. On March 17, 2018, the United States Appeals Court determined Nintendo had not violated Tomita's patent.

On July 17, 2015, Nintendo won a patent suit filed against eight of its handheld consoles, including the 3DS. The suit was originally filed by the Quintal Research Group after it secured a patent for a "computerized information retrieval system" in 2008.

== See also ==
- Citra, a Nintendo 3DS emulator
