= Face Raiders =

Video game for the Nintendo 3DS

- Developer: HAL Laboratory
- Publisher: Nintendo
- Director: Toshiaki Suzuki
- Producer: Shinya Takahashi
- Composer: Shogo Sakai
- Platform: Nintendo 3DS
- Release: JP: February 26, 2011; EU: March 25, 2011; NA: March 27, 2011; AU: March 31, 2011
- Genres: Simulator, shooter
- Mode: Single-player

Face Raiders (Japanese: 顔シューティング, Hepburn: Kao Shūtingu; lit. "Face Shooting") is a 3D augmented reality shooter video game developed by HAL Laboratory and published by Nintendo. In 2011, it was released as preloaded software on all systems in the Nintendo 3DS line of hardware.

== Gameplay ==
Face Raiders is a single player augmented reality shooter game that uses the handheld's gyroscopic controls and cameras. It was first released with the Nintendo 3DS and has been preloaded on all devices in the family. The game is an extended tech demo with a total of two modes and nine levels. Six of these are for experienced players, and the other three stages are meant for those unfamiliar with the game. After taking pictures of people's faces, the game creates enemies for the player, who must shoot them. The camera perspective is from the rear camera's viewpoint, which enemies will break through and hide behind. People walking in the background add on to the gameplay by giving more faces to the camera and thus creating more enemies. There are combos for repeating an action that multiply the number of points. There are butterflies which can be hit in order to refill health, and bombs are used as a quick way to defeat surrounding enemies. At the end of each stage, the player battles a boss. When the boss is defeated, its helmet will transform into an afro. Local high scores are recorded on a leaderboard. By pressing Y on the level select screen, the player can hear some advice, and can turn on surprise snaps for taking photos while playing a level.

== Development ==
HAL Laboratory began developing the game in 2010 alongside other built-in software for the Nintendo 3DS. The team wanted to create a game that would interest people who had played the training software. The prototype, named Face Ace, used the player's and other people's faces to create a comedic experience. HAL first started building using filters, which ended up being included to attack enemies. The merge lens was popular among developers, where two faces would be combined. At the end of development, HAL added a feature where the player can point the 3DS at someone else's face and it would become an enemy. The game's AR features were created with the Nintendo 3DS Camera Team.

== Reception ==
Prior to the release date of the 3DS, Face Raiders received generally positive feedback when it was shown at E3 as a tech demo with blocks instead of faces. When the use of faces were included, reviewers felt satisfied with the fun and humor created by using faces and a live background. The point-and-shoot gameplay with gyroscopic controls was said to be novel and easy to use. The free price was also cited as a positive aspect of the game, though some noted that it would be worth an eShop purchase if it had instead been offered there. The varied tactics to defeat enemies and bosses were applauded. However, the minimal amount of content was criticized. Reviewers also felt that the 3D effect could be compromised by using motion controls. The game was also seen as an introduction to the features the 3DS could offer.
