= Nintendo Game Card =

Game cartridge used on some Nintendo video game consoles

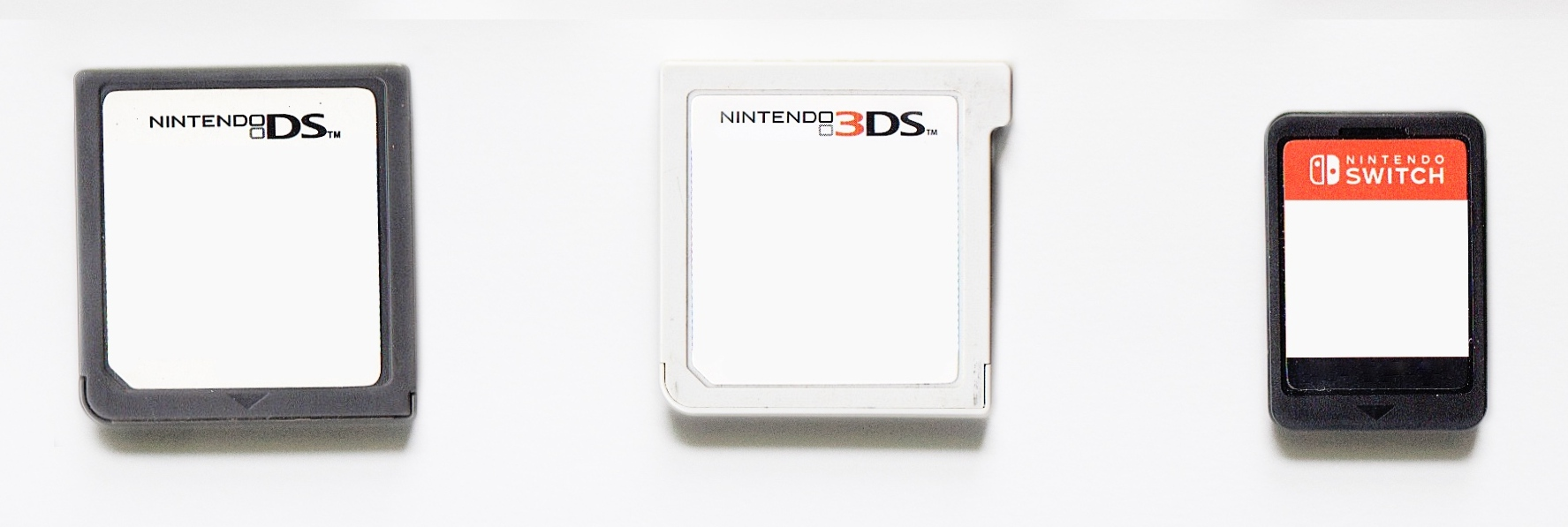
- From left to right: Nintendo DS, Nintendo 3DS, and Nintendo Switch game cards
- Media type: Flash ROM
- Capacity: DS: 8–512 MB; 3DS: 128 MB–4 GB; Switch: 1–32 GB; Switch 2: 16–64 GB
- Developed by: Nintendo; SanDisk; Macronix; Rohm
- Dimensions: DS: 35 mm (1.4 in) high × 33 mm (1.3 in) wide × 3.8 mm (0.15 in) thick; 3DS: 35 mm (1.4 in) high × 33–35 mm (1.3–1.4 in) wide × 3.8 mm (0.15 in) thick; Switch/Switch 2: 31 mm (1.2 in) high × 21 mm (0.83 in) wide × 3 mm (0.12 in) thick
- Weight: 3.5 g (0.12 oz)
- Usage: Nintendo DS family Nintendo 3DS family Nintendo Switch family Nintendo Switch 2

A Nintendo Game Card is a physical flash storage card produced by Nintendo containing video game software for the Nintendo DS and Nintendo 3DS lines of handheld game consoles as well as the Nintendo Switch and Nintendo Switch 2 lines of hybrid game consoles. It is the successor to Nintendo's own Game Pak line of ROM cartridges used in prior consoles and handhelds.

== Nintendo DS ==
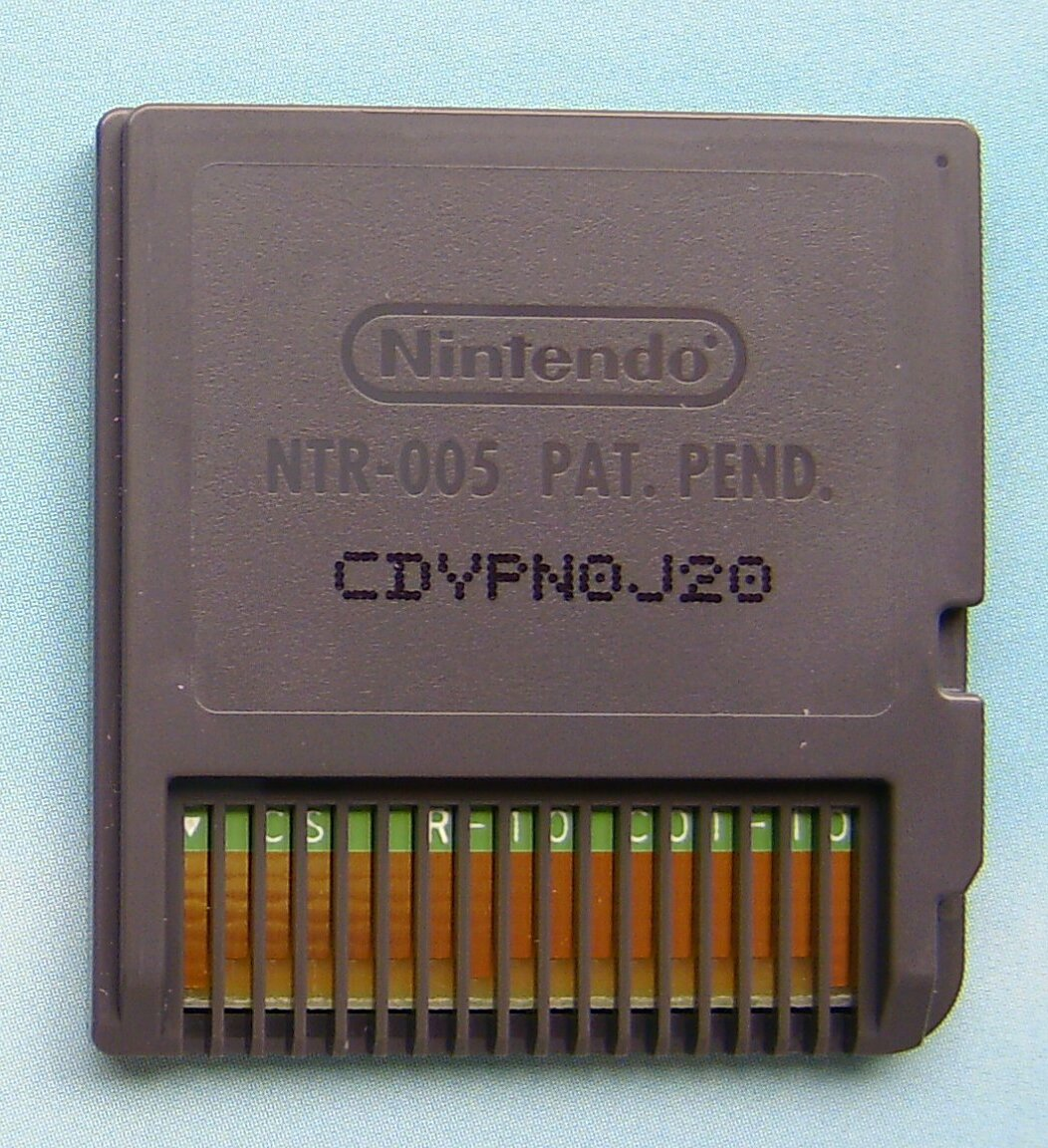
Back side of DS Game Card

=== Nintendo DS Game Card ===
Game cards for the Nintendo DS range from 8 to 512 megabytes in capacity. (Note: Ni no Kuni was the first DS game to use a 512 MB card.) The cards contain an integrated flash memory for game data and an EEPROM to save user data such as game progress or high scores. However, there are a small number of games that have no save memory such as Electroplankton.

It has been mentioned that larger (>64 MB) cards had a 25% slower data transfer rate; however, the specific base rate is unknown.

=== Nintendo DSi Game Card ===
Many Nintendo DS titles released after the launch of the Nintendo DSi in 2008 include features that enhance gameplay when played on the Nintendo DSi console. Most of these games are compatible with the older DS models. However, a select few retail game titles were released that worked exclusively for the Nintendo DSi consoles for reasons such as requiring camera functions. These titles have game cards with white-colored casings. While these game cards can be physically inserted into original Nintendo DS consoles, their software does not function due to the missing hardware features and will display an error message. These DSi-exclusive game cards are fully compatible with the Nintendo 3DS family.

Examples of DSi-exclusive game cards include Picture Perfect Hair Salon. All DSi-exclusive games are region locked.

Prior to the release of the Nintendo DSi, Nintendo encouraged developers to release DSi-exclusive games as DSiWare downloadables instead of retail game cards that would not function on older Nintendo DS consoles.

=== Infrared support ===
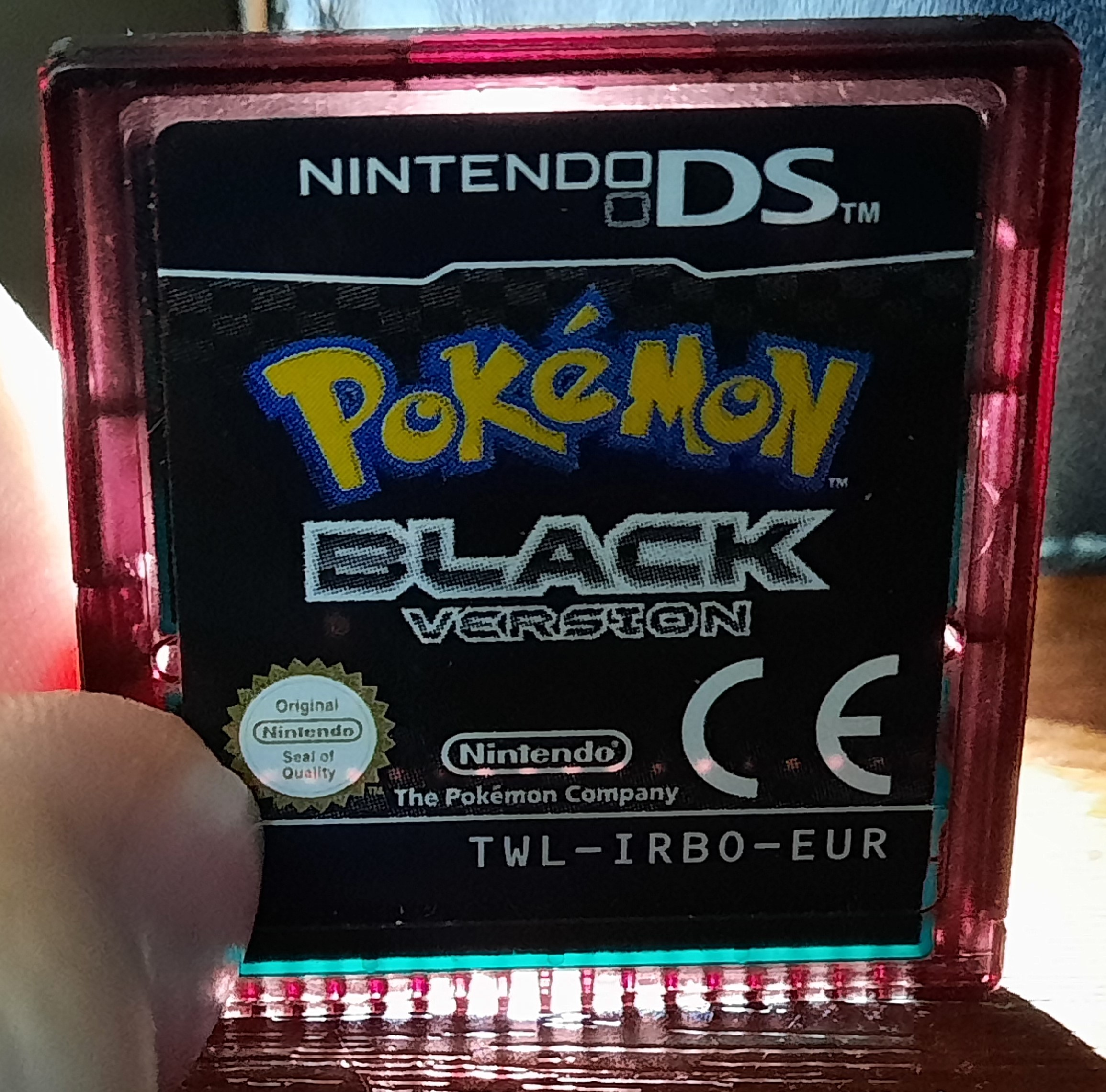
A Pokémon Black Version game card, showing its translucent red color when exposed to light

Despite all iterations of the Nintendo DS line lacking native infrared support, certain titles made use of this type of communication function using game cards with their own infrared transceiver. These game cards are darker colored than regular DS/DSi game cards, and reveal their translucency when exposed to light.

Examples of game cards with infrared support include Personal Trainer: Walking and Active Health With Carol Vorderman, which connect to the included pedometers, Pokémon HeartGold and SoulSilver, which connect to the included Pokéwalker accessory, and Pokémon Black and White and Pokémon Black 2 and White 2, which connect DS systems facing each other.

=== Nintendo 3DS recovery mechanism ===
The Nintendo 3DS has a recovery measure that allows the system to boot into specific Nintendo DS/DSi flash cartridges instead of its built-in firmware, which can be used to restore bricked systems with corrupted or damaged firmware or NAND flash. Hackers and modders have created exploits that targeted this mode, allowing for unsigned software and certain homebrew to run on any system regardless of the software version, as well as for installing custom firmware.

== Nintendo 3DS ==
=== Nintendo 3DS Game Card ===
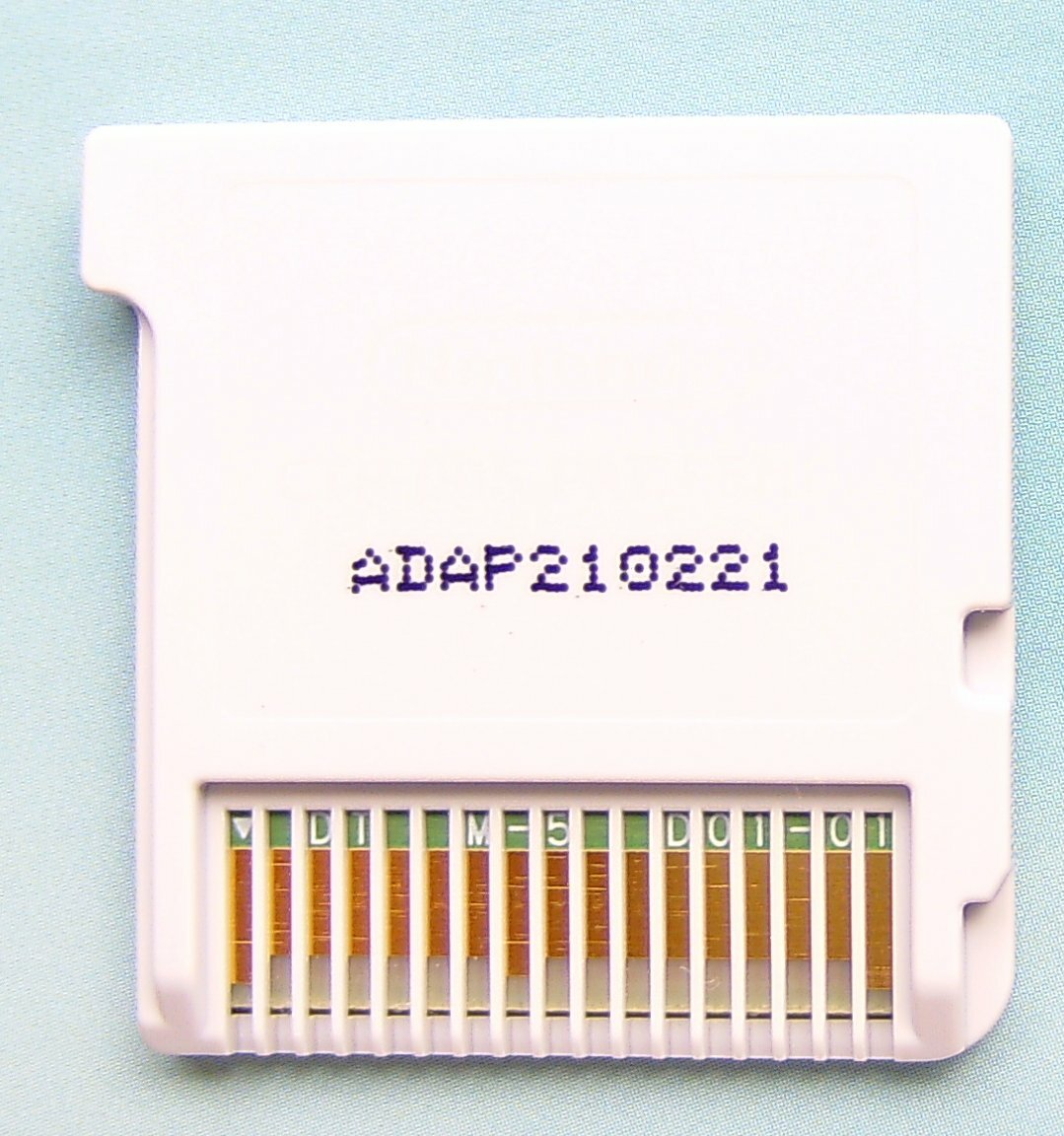
Back side of 3DS Game Card, showing its extra tab at top left

Game cards for the Nintendo 3DS are from 1 to 4 gigabytes in size, with 2 GB of game data at launch. Though it was reported storage options range up to 8 GB, no game cards over 4 GB were ever released. They look very similar to DS game cards, but are incompatible and have a small tab on one side to prevent them from being inserted into a DS, DS Lite, DSi or DSi XL/LL. All 3DS games are region locked, similar to that of DSi-exclusive games.

=== New Nintendo 3DS Game Card ===
While the New Nintendo 3DS accepts all game cards for the 3DS, there are a small number of game titles that were released on game cards that took advantage of the handheld's upgraded hardware. They looked identical in appearance to standard 3DS game cards and can be physically inserted into original 3DS/3DS XL systems, but are incompatible and will display an error message, similar to DSi-exclusive game cards.

== Nintendo Switch ==
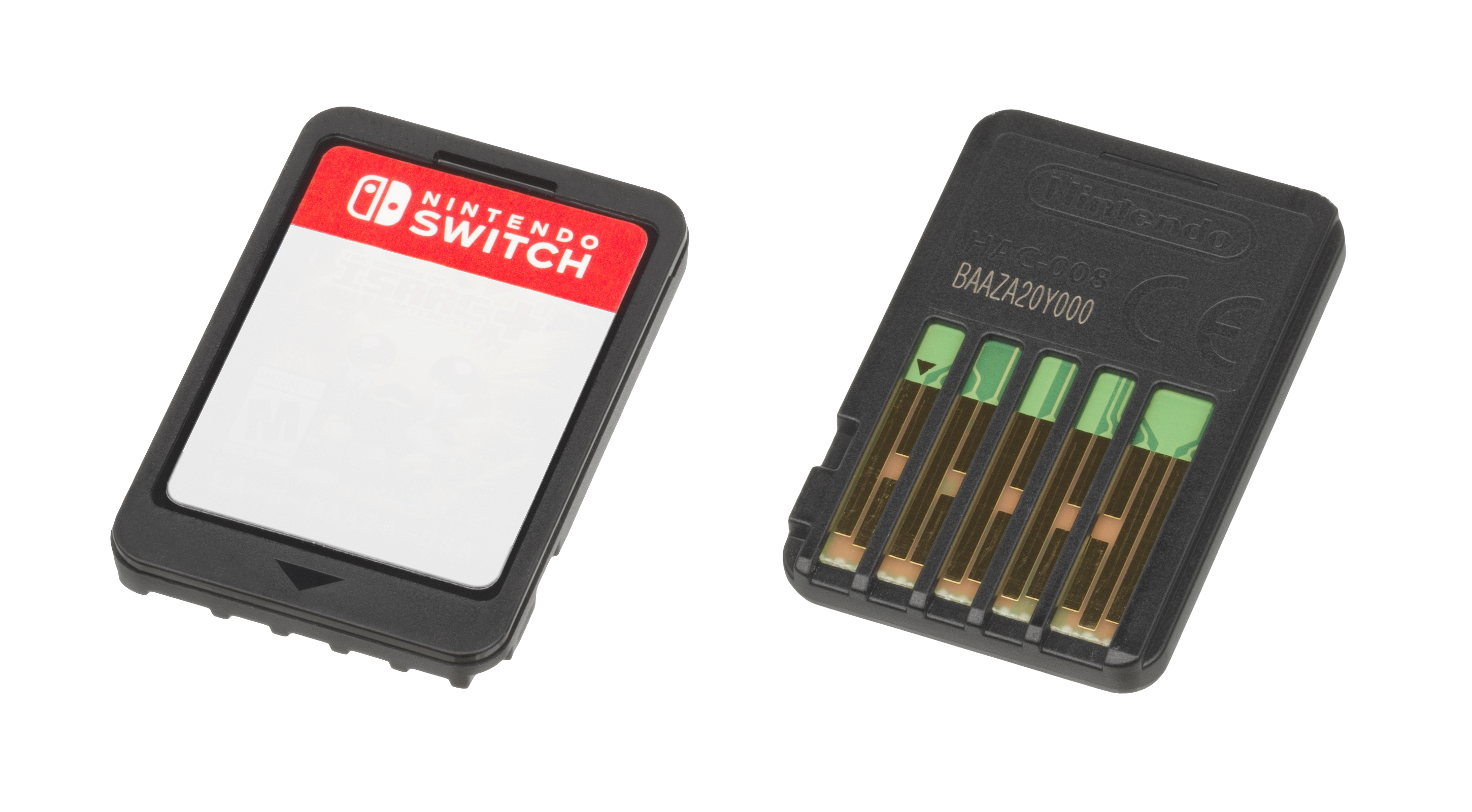
Front (left) and back (right) sides of Switch Game Card

The Nintendo Switch uses non-volatile flash memory technology similar to SD cards that are officially called game cards. These are distinct technologies from volatile game cartridges that are similar to RAM boards. This iteration is smaller and has a larger storage capacity than its previous versions. Despite its similarities, the Switch is not compatible with DS and 3DS cards. The game cards used in the Switch are non-writable and save data is stored in the console's internal memory, unlike DS and 3DS game cards, which are writable and able to store save data. Games for the Switch are region free, unlike DSi-exclusive games and 3DS games.

Because of their small size, Nintendo Switch game cards are coated with denatonium benzoate, a non-toxic bitterant, as a safety precaution against accidental or deliberate consumption by young children. Videos of users intentionally tasting game cards and reacting with disgust at the taste became a meme prior to the console's launch, which originated from Jeff Gerstmann's actions on a Giant Bomb webcast.

Game cards for the Nintendo Switch can have capacities of 1 GB, 2 GB, 4 GB, 8 GB, 16 GB and 32 GB in size. There were plans to introduce 64 GB game cards by the second half of 2018, however this was pushed back several times throughout the Switch's lifespan. Ultimately, they never ended up being available for the Switch, but it did end up being available for the Nintendo Switch 2, its successor released nearly eight years later.

== Nintendo Switch 2 ==
The Nintendo Switch 2 uses the same non-volatile flash memory technology as with the original Nintendo Switch officially known as game cards. They share the same size and dimensions, but are colored red instead of dark gray and have a small notch on the bottom right of the rear portion to distinguish them; the notch itself has no impact on inserting them into an original Switch unlike with Nintendo 3DS game cards being inserted on a Nintendo DS system. Similar to the original Switch, games for the Switch 2 are region free.

Like the original Switch, game cards for the Switch 2 are coated with denatonium benzoate, a non-toxic bitterant, as a safety precaution against accidental or deliberate consumption by young children, due to their small sizes.

Games for the Nintendo Switch 2 are released in three variations: standard Switch 2 game cards, Switch 2 Edition game cards, and Game-Key Cards. While the game files are physically present on the former two versions, they must first be downloaded locally before playing the latter. These cards can be identified by a unique serial number located on the game card's label.

=== Traditional game card ===
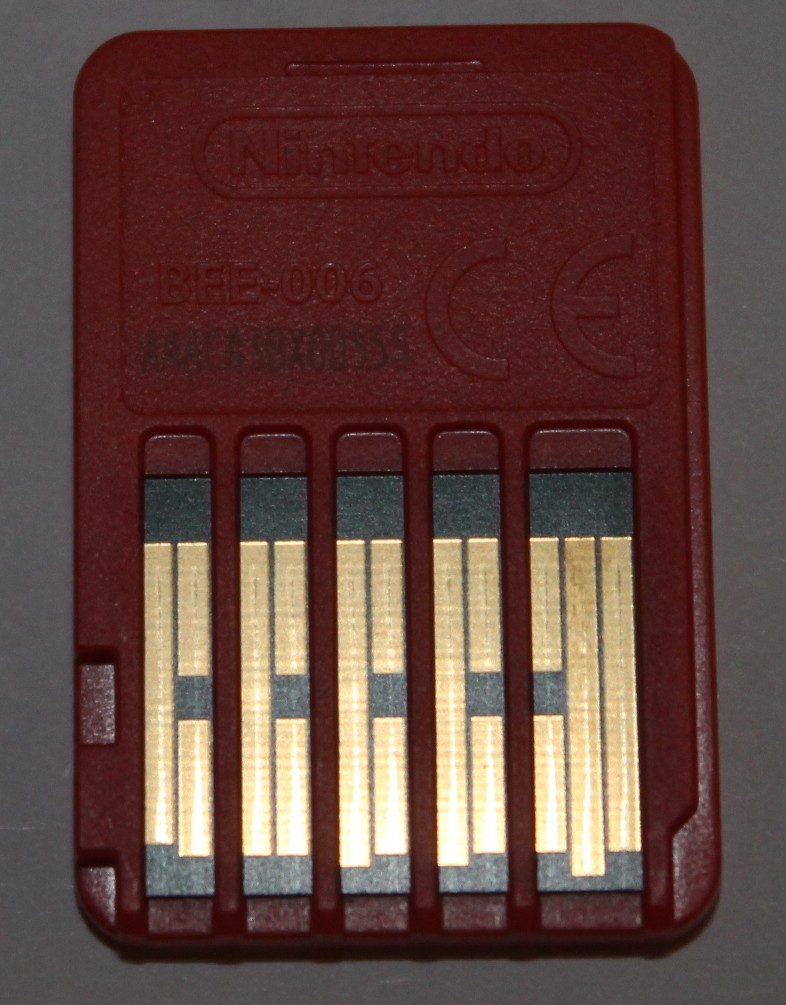
Back side of Switch 2 Game Card, showing an additional notch on the bottom right

The standard game card for the Switch 2 comes in 16GB, 32GB, and 64GB variations. Game cards for the Nintendo Switch 2 also have improved read speeds over the original Switch's game cards. While these game cards can be physically inserted into the original Switch, their software does not function.

Initially, Nintendo only offered the 64GB size, which meant many publishers elected to use the cheaper Game-Key Card instead. Cyberpunk 2077: Ultimate Edition was one of the console's first big third-party releases that used the 64 GB game card. In December 2025, rumors of smaller capacity game cards for the Switch 2 circulated, which confirmed that they were reportedly in production but may take longer to distribute than 64 GB game cards as well as being more expensive to produce due to the ongoing chip shortages and the rising cost of materials which affected the production of the NAND flash used in the Switch and Switch 2's game cards. For instance, R-Type Dimensions III was planned for release later that year on game cards rather than Game-Key Cards, which are reportedly known to be available in two smaller capacity game cards. In September 2026, a 32GB game card was confirmed with the announcement of the Switch 2 version of Stellar Blade.

==== Nintendo Switch 2 Edition game card ====
Repackaged Nintendo Switch games for the Switch 2 featuring both the game in original Switch format and Switch 2 exclusive upgrades, are officially known as "Nintendo Switch 2 Edition" game cards. These are enhanced original Switch game cards that can be used on both the original Switch and Switch 2 systems. If inserted into the original Switch console, they will act as if it were a copy of the original Switch game, unlike Switch 2 exclusive game cards.

These cards can be identified by a unique serial number located on the game card's label indicating Switch 2 enhanced game cards as well as the text reading "Nintendo Switch 2 Edition". It uses the same 64 GB capacity as with Switch 2 game cards to store both the original Switch software alongside Switch 2 upgrades to said software.

Switch games can be upgraded to "Switch 2 Edition" games, where enhanced features are only available when inserted into the Switch 2 console.

=== Game-Key Card ===
A Game-Key Card is a game card for the Switch 2 that requires an internet connection and initial download to play. Although they look similar to standard Switch 2 game cards, they contain no data on them other than a digital license for the game, which requires the software to be downloaded either online or through local wireless via the "Match Version with Local User" option before it can be used. Once downloaded, an internet connection is no longer needed, but the physical game card is required for validation purposes. These game cards can be identified by a small key symbol located at the top-right on the game card's label. They are not tied to a specific Nintendo Account; therefore, they can be used regardless of whether or not it has been resold or if a Nintendo Account is used.

Game-Key Cards have since become a common practice among most third-party publishers as a way to sell their games at retail alongside being offered via digital distribution channels without opting for the option of storing the entire game on a 64 GB game card, especially in cases where the game exceeds the 64 GB space.
