= Fast Cycle DRAM =

Specialty DRAM, faster than contemporary SDRAM

Fast Cycle DRAM (FCRAM) is a type of synchronous dynamic random-access memory developed by Fujitsu and Toshiba. FCRAM has a shorter data access latency compared to contemporary commodity SDRAMs; and is used in where the lower data access latency is more desirable than low cost and high capacity (FCRAM is a moderate cost and capacity speciality DRAM). FCRAM achieves its low latency by dividing each row into multiple sub-rows, of which only one is activated during a row-activation operation. This reduced the effective array size, improving the access time. FCRAM has a DDR SDRAM-like command set to enable memory controllers that support both DDR SDRAM and FCRAM. It also has a standard dual in-line memory module (DIMM).
