= System software =

Platform-providing software

System software is software that provides a platform for other software. Examples include the kernel and device drivers of an operating system (OS). A program that runs in the context of the platform is classified as application or utility software based on the functionality it provides and the role of intended users. Application software provides for the normal use of a computer, without regard to how the computer works or what it needs to function. It is used to accomplish end user tasks such as writing documents, playing video games, listening to music, drawing pictures, browsing the web and developing software. Utility software supports managing system hardware and software (system administrator tasks).

System software typically includes operating systems, device drivers, utility programs, and language translators such as compilers and assemblers.

Many operating systems are installed with application and utility software. Regardless, application software is generally not classified as system software. Core utility software is considered by some to be system software if it cannot be uninstalled without affecting the functioning of other software.

== See also ==
- Nintendo DSi system software – Handheld game console operating system
- Nintendo 3DS system software – Operating system for the Nintendo 3DS
- Nintendo Switch system software – Operating system for the Nintendo Switch and Nintendo Switch 2
- PlayStation 3 system software – System software for the PlayStation 3
- PlayStation 4 system software – System software for the PlayStation 4
- PlayStation Portable system software – System software for the PlayStation Portable
- PlayStation Vita system software – System software for the PlayStation Vita
- Support programs for OS/360 and successors – Support programs included in or available for IBM OS/360 and successors
- System programming language – Class of computer programming languages
- Systems programming – Developing programs for computer systems
- Wii system software – Operating system for the Nintendo Wii
- Wii U system software – Operating system for Nintendo's Wii U home video game console
- Xbox system software – System software for the Xbox consoles
