= Horizon OS =

Horizon OS may refer to:

- Nintendo 3DS system software, known under the codename Horizon
- Nintendo Switch system software, an operating system for Switch and Switch 2 also known as Horizon
- Meta Horizon OS, an Android-based operating system for Meta Quest headsets
