= PlayStation 3 system software =

System software for the PlayStation 3

- Original PlayStation 3 logo (2006 - 2009) Revised PlayStation 3 logo (2009 - 2017)

- XrossMediaBar, the graphical shell of the PlayStation 3
- Developer: Sony Computer Entertainment
- OS family: Unix (BSD)
- Working state: Current
- Source model: Closed source
- Initial release: 1.00 / 11 November 2006; 20 years ago
- Latest release: 4.93 / 18 March 2026; 7 months ago
- Available in: Chinese (Simplified), Chinese (Traditional), Danish, Dutch, English (United Kingdom), English (United States), Finnish, French, German, Italian, Japanese, Korean, Norwegian, Polish, Portuguese (Brazil), Portuguese (Portugal), Russian, Spanish, Swedish, Turkish
- Update method: Direct Download; Download to USB; Game Disc
- Supported platforms: PlayStation 3
- Kernel type: Monolithic
- Default user interface: XrossMediaBar
- Preceded by: PlayStation 2
- Succeeded by: PlayStation 4 (system software)
- Official website: US; EU; Japan

The PlayStation 3 system software is the updatable firmware and operating system of the PlayStation 3. The base operating system used by Sony for the PlayStation 3 is a fork of both FreeBSD and NetBSD known internally as CellOS or GameOS. It uses XrossMediaBar as its graphical shell.

The process of updating is almost identical to that of the PlayStation Portable and the later PlayStation Vita, PlayStation 4, and PlayStation 5. The software may be updated by downloading the update directly on the PlayStation 3, downloading it from the user's local official PlayStation website to a PC and using a USB storage device to transfer it to the PlayStation 3, or installing the update from game discs containing update data.

The PlayStation 3 system software continues to be updated as of 2026 for performance and security enhancements, and to renew the Blu-ray encryption key.

== Technology ==
=== System ===
The native operating system of the PlayStation 3 is CellOS, which is believed to be a fork of FreeBSD; TCP/IP stack fingerprinting identifies a PlayStation 3 as running FreeBSD, and the PlayStation 3 is known to contain code from FreeBSD and NetBSD.

The 3D computer graphics API software used in the PlayStation 3 is LibGCM and PSGL, based on OpenGL ES and Nvidia's Cg. LibGCM is a low level API, and PSGL is a higher level API, but most developers preferred to use libGCM due to higher levels of performance. This is similar to the later PlayStation 4 console which also has two APIs, the low level GNM and the higher level GNMX.

Unlike many Software Development Kits (SDKs) for mobile app platforms, Sony's PlayStation 3 SDK is only available to registered game development companies and contains software tools and an integrated hardware component. Due to the fact that it requires a licensing agreement with Sony (which is considered expensive), a number of open source and homebrew PS3 SDKs are available in addition to a number of leaked PS3 SDKs.

=== Graphical shell ===
The PlayStation 3 uses the XrossMediaBar (XMB) as its graphical user interface, which is also used in the PlayStation Portable (PSP) handheld console, a variety of Sony BRAVIA HDTVs, Blu-ray disc players, and many more Sony products. XMB displays icons horizontally across the screen that be seen as categories. Users can navigate through them using the left and right buttons of the D-pad, which move the icons forward or back across the screen, highlighting just one at a time, as opposed to using any kind of pointer to select an option. When one category is selected, there are usually more specific options then available to select that are spread vertically above and below the selected icon. Users may navigate among these options by using the up and down buttons of the D-pad.

The basic features offered by XMB implementations varies based on device and software version. Apart from those appearing in the PSP console such as category icons for Photos, Music and Games, the PS3 added Users, TV and Friends to the XMB. Also, XMB offers a degree of multitasking. In-game XMB features were added to the PS3 properly with firmware version 2.41 after causing early implementation problems. While XMB proved to be a successful user interface for Sony products such as PSP and PS3, the next generation Sony video game consoles such as the PlayStation 4 and the PlayStation Vita no longer use this user interface.

=== Cooperation with handheld consoles ===
The PlayStation 3 supports Remote Play with Sony's handheld game consoles, the PlayStation Portable and the PlayStation Vita. However, unlike Remote Play between the PlayStation 4 and the PlayStation Vita, the problem with PS3 was that it only supported a "select" few titles and results were often laggy. However, it is clear that Remote Play with the PS3 was the testing bed for its much better integration with the PS4.

Also, for users having both the PlayStation 3 and the PlayStation Vita, it is possible to share media files videos, music and images between them by transferring multimedia files directly from the PlayStation 3 to the PlayStation Vita, or vice versa. Furthermore, they can use a service called cross-buy which allows them to buy certain games that support this feature one time, and play them in both Sony platforms. Not only that, but in the case of most such games, their saved games actually transfer back and forth between devices, allowing players to pick up from the moment they left off.

There is also a feature called cross-play (or cross-platform play) covering any PlayStation Vita software title that can interact with a PlayStation 3 software title. Different software titles use Cross-Play in different ways. For example, Ultimate Marvel vs. Capcom 3 is a title supporting the Cross-Play feature, and the PS3 version of the game can be controlled using the PS Vita system. In addition, some PS3 games can be played on the PS Vita using the PlayStation Now streaming service.

=== Non-game features ===
Similar to many other consoles, the PlayStation 3 is capable of photo, audio, and video playback in a variety of formats. It includes various photo slideshow options and several music visualizations. The PlayStation 3 is able to play Blu-ray and DVD movies as well as audio CDs out of the box. When playing an audio CD, the system attempts retrieve album information from Gracenote, however this service is no longer available. The system was also capable of using streaming media services such as Netflix and Spotify from the PlayStation Store.

In early versions of the system software, the web browser included in the PS3 was based on NetFront, which was also used on the PlayStation Portable. From version 4.10 released in 2012, the web browser was upgraded to be based on the more modern WebKit, which is used in Apple Safari and continues to be used on newer PlayStation systems. The web browser can play Adobe Flash content. Still, the PS3 web browser struggles to connect to modern websites due to the prevalence of modern Transport Layer Security and HTTPS.

Early versions of the PlayStation 3 system software provided a feature called OtherOS, which was available on the PS3 systems prior to the slimmer models launched in September 2009. This feature enabled users to install an operating system such as Linux, but due to security concerns, Sony later removed this functionality through the 3.21 system software update. According to Sony Computer Entertainment (SCE), disabling this feature will help ensure that PS3 owners will continue to have access to the broad range of gaming and entertainment content from SCE and its content partners on a more secure system. Sony was successfully sued in a class action over the removal of this feature. The settlement was approved in September 2016. Sony agreed to pay up to $55 to as many as 10 million PS3 owners, but denied wrongdoing.

Furthermore, the PlayStation 3 provides printing support. It can for example print images and web pages when a supported printer is connected via a USB cable or a local network. However, only a selection of printers from Canon, Epson, and Hewlett-Packard are compatible with the PS3.

=== Backwards compatibility ===
All PlayStation 3 consoles are able to play original PlayStation games (PS One discs and downloadable classics). However, not all PlayStation 3 models are backwards compatible with PlayStation 2 games. In summary, early PS3 consoles such as the 20GB and 60GB launch PS3 consoles were backwards compatible with PS2 games because they had the PS2 "Emotion Engine" CPU in them. Some later models, most notably the 80GB Metal Gear Solid PS3 consoles are also backwards compatible, through partial software emulation in this case since they no longer had the PS2 CPU in them, although they do have the PS2 GPU in them, allowing for reduced backward compatibility through hardware-assisted software emulation. All other later models, such as the 40GB, 140GB, PS3 Slim, and PS3 Super Slim are not backwards compatible with PS2 games, though users can still enjoy PS One and PS3 games on them. According to Sony, when they removed backwards compatibility from the PS3, they had already been at a point where they were three years into its lifecycle; by that time the vast majority of consumers that were purchasing the PS3 cite PS3 games as a primary reason, meaning that the PS2 compatibility was no longer necessary. Nevertheless, PS2 Classics which are playable on the PS3 have officially been introduced to the PlayStation Network for purchase afterwards, although they are only a selection of PS2 games republished in digital format, and unlike PS3 games, they lack Trophy support. Later when the PlayStation 4 console was released, it was not backward compatible with either PlayStation 3, PlayStation 2, or PlayStation 1 games, although limited PS2 backward compatibility was later introduced, and PS4 owners might play a selected group of PS3 games by streaming them over the Internet using the PlayStation Now cloud-based gaming service.

=== LV0 keys ===
The PlayStation 3 LV0 keys are a set of cryptographic keys which form the core of the PlayStation 3's security system. According to a news story on Polygon:

Under normal circumstances, PlayStation 3 consoles are locked so that they can only run software and operating systems approved by Sony. When a PlayStation 3 is successfully hacked, users can perform actions that would otherwise not be possible or allowed on the console, such as play pirated games and run unauthorized operating systems.

With the LV0 keys, users are able to circumvent restrictions placed by Sony, more commonly known as jailbreaking. The LV0 keys were released online by a group calling themselves "The Three Musketeers", granting users access to some of the most sensitive parts of the PlayStation 3. With access to these areas, users can decrypt security updates and work around the authorized PlayStation firmware. This allows PlayStation 3 firmware updates to be modified on a computer so that they can be run on a modified console. The Three Musketeers decided to release the code after a group of rival hackers obtained the code and planned to sell it. While this is not the first time the PlayStation 3 has been hacked, according to Eurogamer, "The release of the new custom firmware—and the LV0 decryption keys in particular—poses serious issues." It also says that "options Sony has in battling this leak are limited" since "the reveal of the LV0 key basically means that any system update released by Sony going forward can be decrypted with little or no effort whatsoever".

== History of updates ==
The "initial" release for the PlayStation 3 system software was version 1.10 as appeared on 11 November 2006 in Japan and 17 November 2006 in North America that provided the PlayStation Network services and the Remote Play for the 60 GB model. However, version 1.02 was included with some games. There were a number of updates in the 1.xx versions, which provided new features such as the Account Management, compatibility of USB devices for PlayStation 2 format games, and supports for USB webcams and Bluetooth keyboards and mice. Version 1.80 released on 24 May 2007 added a number of relatively small new features, mostly related to media and videos, such as the ability to upscale standard DVD-Videos to 1080p and to downscale Blu-ray video to 720p. Version 1.90 released on 24 May 2007 further added the Wallpaper feature for the background of XMB and the ability to eject a game disc using the controller, to re-order game icons by format and creation date. This update also forced 24 Hz output for Blu-ray over HDMI, and introduced bookmarks and a security function to the web browser. The last version in the 1.xx series was 1.94 released on 23 October 2007 that added support for DualShock 3 controllers.

As with the version 1.xx series, there were a number of versions in the 2.xx and 3.xx series, released between 8 November 2007 and 20 September 2011. There were quite a few noticeable changes, and in version 2.10 alone there were new features such as the additions of the Voice Changer feature with the power to make users sound like a person using a voice changer with five presets over hi and low tones, a new music bitmapping process specifically designed for the PS3 to provide enhanced audio playback, as well as supports for DivX and WMV playback and Blu-ray disc profile 1.1 for picture-in-picture. Version 2.50 released on 15 October 2008 was the update in the 2.xx series that contained the largest number of new features or changes, among them were the support for official PS3 Bluetooth headset, in-game screenshots and Adobe Flash 9. A recovery menu (or safe mode) was also introduced in this version. Later versions in the 2.xx series such as the 2.7x, 2.85 or 2.90 were distributed with the PS3 "slim". Similar to versions such as 2.00, versions such as 3.00, 3.10, 3.30, 3.40, and 3.70 all introduced relatively large number of new features or changes, such as supports for new Dynamic Custom Themes, improvements in the Internet Browser, Trophy enhancements, and a new [Video Editor & Uploader] application.

The initial slim PS3s SKU shipped with a unique firmware with new features, also seen in software 3.00.

The most noticeable change in the version 4.00 released on 30 November 2011 was the added support for the PlayStation Vita handheld game consoles. For example, [PS Vita System] was added as an option and [PS Vita System Application Utility] has been added as a feature under [Game]. With this update, the PlayStation 3 also gained the ability to transfer videos, images, musics, and game data to and from the PlayStation Vita. Version 4.10 released on 8 February 2012 also added improvements to the Internet Browser including some support for HTML5 and its display speed and web page layout accuracy. Later versions in the 4.xx series all made a few changes to the system, mostly to improve the stability and operation quality during the uses of some applications, in addition to adding new features such as displaying closed captions when playing BDs and DVDs and "Check for Update" to the options menu for a game. The PlayStation 3 system software is currently still being updated by Sony.

=== Withdrawal of update 2.40 ===
System software version 2.40, which included the in-game XMB feature and PlayStation 3 Trophies, was released on 2 July 2008; however, it was withdrawn later the same day because a small number of users were unable to restart their consoles after performing the update. The fault was explained to have been because of certain system administrative data being contained in the HDD. The issue was addressed in version 2.41 of the system software released on 8 July 2008.

=== Class action suit filed over update 3.0 ===
System software version 3.0 was released on 1 September 2009. Shortly after its release, a number of users complained that the system update caused their system's Blu-ray drive to malfunction. In addition, John Kennedy of Florida filed a class action suit against Sony Computer Entertainment America(SCEA). John Kennedy had purchased a PlayStation 3 in January 2009, claiming it worked perfectly until he installed the required firmware update 3.0, at which point the Blu-ray drive in his system ceased functioning properly. Sony later released a statement, "SCEA is aware of reports that PS3 owners are experiencing isolated issues with their PS3 system since installing the most recent system software update (v3.00)," and released software update 3.01 on 15 September 2009. However, after installing 3.01, the plaintiff alleged the problems were not only not solved, but the new update created new issues as well.

=== Class action suits filed over update 3.21 ===
Due to the removal of the "OtherOS" feature from older models of the PS3 due to security issues (possibly related to the exploit released by geohot) which caused an uproar in the PlayStation community, several lawsuits have been filed. The first one was filed on behalf of PS3 owners by Anthony Ventura. The suit states that removing the feature constitutes breach of contract, false advertising and a handful of other business practices relating to consumer protection laws as the feature was touted by Sony when these systems were new as a way consumers could turn their machines into a basic PC and cites that the feature was "extremely valuable" and one of the main reasons that many people paid more for the PS3 over buying a competing console like a Wii or an Xbox 360. It also elaborates that anyone who does not accept the update can no longer play future games or future Blu-ray movie releases. Later on, two more suits were also filed by other members of the PlayStation 3 community. The first of these newer lawsuits was filed by Todd Densmore and Antal Herz which claim Sony has rendered several PlayStation 3 features they paid for "inoperable" as a result of the release of firmware 3.21. The second filed was by Jason Baker, Sean Bosquett, Paul Graham, and Paul Vannatta, and claims, among other things, that they "lost money by purchasing a PS3 without receiving the benefit of their bargain because the product is not what it was claimed to be - a game console that would provide both the Other OS feature and gaming functions." A fourth lawsuit was filed by Keith Wright and seeks compensation equal to the cost of the console. A fifth lawsuit was filed by Jeffrey Harper and Zachary Kummer which calls for a jury trial. A sixth lawsuit was filed by Johnathon Huber and has quotes from both the EU and US PlayStation blogs.

Sony responded to the lawsuits by requesting a dismissal on the grounds that "no one cared about the feature" and that the filings cite quotes from 3rd party websites, the instruction manual, the PlayStation Web site and claims they are invalid proof and that Sony can disable PSN and the other advertised features (playing games that require newer firmware, etc.) as they wish. The lawyers for the plaintiffs reviewed the request and said that this is fairly common at this stage of the process and that the case would be reviewed before a judge in November 2010. In February 2011, all claims of false advertising in the case were dismissed, but the plaintiffs were allowed to appeal and amend the case and the other claims that the removal violated the Computer Fraud and Abuse act were allowed to go forward. In March 2011, the plaintiffs amended their complaint to refute Sony's claims that it was within its rights under the TOS and warranty to remove the feature adding more details to their claims including breach of warranty, breach of implied warranty, breach of contract, unjust enrichment, and breach of several California unfair business practices laws. In April 2011, SCEA again asked that the case be dismissed and made claims that the plaintiffs refiled claim was insufficient and that they were hackers and wanted to violate Sony's intellectual property and asked the judge to grant search rights on their PS3 systems. SCEA also made claims that they were not the division solely responsible for the removal and should not be held responsible despite conflicting information to the contrary. On 18 April 2011, the plaintiffs fired back at Sony's renewed efforts to have the case dismissed by pointing out the fact that Sony had made many of the same claims before and that they had been dismissed by the court and also pointed out several legal precedents under California law that refuted Sony's claims. In December 2011, the whole case was dismissed under the grounds that the plaintiffs had failed to prove that they could expect the "Other OS" feature beyond the warranty of the machine. However, this decision was overturned in a 2014 appellate court decision finding that plaintiffs had indeed made clear and sufficiently substantial claims.

Ultimately, in 2016, Sony settled with users who installed Linux or purchased a PlayStation 3 based upon the alternative OS functionality.

=== Withdrawal of update 4.45 ===
System software version 4.45 was released on 18 June 2013; however, it was withdrawn one day later because a small number of users were unable to restart their consoles after performing the update. On 21 June 2013, Morgan Haro, a Community Manager for PlayStation Network, announced that the issue had been identified and a new update was planned to be released to resolve the issue. The system update that addressed this issue, version 4.46, was released on 27 June 2013, and a fix for those affected by system version 4.45 was also provided by Sony.

== See also ==
- Media Go
- Linux for PlayStation 3
- LocationFree Player
- Qriocity
- XrossMediaBar

Other gaming platforms from Sony:

- PlayStation 4 system software
- PlayStation Portable system software
- PlayStation Vita system software

Other gaming platforms from the eighth generation:

- Wii U system software
- Xbox One system software
- Nintendo 3DS system software
- Nintendo Switch system software

Other gaming platforms from the seventh generation:

- Wii system software
- Xbox 360 system software
- Nintendo DSi system software
