= Home Menu =

A home screen is the main screen of a device or computer program.

Home Menu or HOME Menu may also refer to the system software for three Nintendo video game systems:

- Home Menu (Nintendo 3DS), the main system menu of the Nintendo 3DS
- Home Menu (Wii), a system menu accessed while using Wii software
- Home Menu (Wii U), a system menu accessed while using Wii U software
