= PSGL =

Rendering API

PSGL is a rendering API available additionally to GCM and OpenGL for Sony's PlayStation 3. PSGL is based on OpenGL ES and Nvidia's CG. A previous version of PSGL was available for the PlayStation 2 but was largely unused.

PSGL was meant to be a foundation for the future, beyond the PlayStation 3, but for the PlayStation 4 Sony introduced GNM and GNMX and also their custom shading language, PlayStation Shader Language (PSSL).

== Features ==
- Programmable shading with Cg
- OpenGL ES 1.1 extensions (VBO, FBO, PBO, Cubemap)
- texture extensions (FP, DXT, 3D, NPO2, Aniso, Depth, Vertex Textures)
- primitive/rendering extensions (Instancing, Primitive Restart, Queries, Conditional Rendering)
- synchronization extensions (Fences, Events)
- SCE performance extensions (TextureReference, AttribSet)

== See also ==
- Mantle API – low-level API for PC gaming
- GNM – low-level API on the PlayStation 4
- OpenGL – high-level API for CAD and gaming
- GNMX – high-level API on the PlayStation 4
