= Jump Rope Challenge =

2020 fitness video game

- Developer: Nintendo EPD
- Publisher: Nintendo
- Engine: Unity
- Platform: Nintendo Switch
- Release: NA: June 15, 2020; WW: June 16, 2020
- Genre: Exergaming
- Modes: Single-player, multiplayer

Jump Rope Challenge is a fitness video game developed and published by Nintendo for the Nintendo Switch. In the game, the player is encouraged to "jump a skipping rope", by performing motions using the Joy-Con controllers, every day a prespecified number of times.

The game was developed by a small team to keep active at home during the stay-at-home orders of the COVID-19 pandemic. It was released for free on the Switch's Nintendo eShop in June 2020. It was originally intended to be removed from the eShop three months subsequent to release, but Nintendo later announced that the game would remain available until further notice.

== Gameplay ==
In Jump Rope Challenge, the player uses Joy-Con controllers in a basic skipping rope motion in conjunction with jumping up and down to emulate jumping a skipping rope. The in-game screen displays an anthropomorphic rabbit character skipping alongside the player, as well as counting the number of jumps the player does. Initially, the game sets the player the task of reaching at least 100 jumps every day, although this goal can be manually increased. The player's total jumps for each day are recorded in a timeline, allowing the player to see how much they have progressed. Jump Rope Challenge can also be played in multiplayer with 2 players, each player holding one Joy-Con.

== Development and release ==
During the COVID-19 pandemic, Nintendo developers were to work from home due to stay-at-home orders. Because of the orders, some developers were not able to exercise as much as they would before the pandemic. Jump Rope Challenge was developed by a small team of developers working at home to be able to keep active in their houses during the pandemic.

Jump Rope Challenge was released over digital distribution on the Nintendo eShop on June 16, 2020, after a surprise announcement from Nintendo on Twitter. The game was released as a free download, and was intended to only be available for a limited time, as Nintendo planned to remove it from the eShop on September 30, 2020. However, on the day, the company announced they would keep it on the store until further notice. Nintendo stated that over 200 million jumps had been performed in the game three days after release, and 2.5 billion after three months.

A free update to the game, released on July 1, 2020, adds the ability to double-under as well as new backgrounds and costumes for the rabbit to wear based on Mario, Luigi, Princess Peach, Toad, Bowser, and Wario from Super Mario, Link from The Legend of Zelda, Samus Aran from Metroid, Isabelle from Animal Crossing, the Inklings from Splatoon, and the Arcade Bunny from Nintendo Badge Arcade.

== Reception ==
Reception

Review score
Publication	Score
Nintendo Life	8/10

The game was reviewed positively by Ollie Reynolds of Nintendo Life, saying that using the Joy-Con as a skipping rope felt authentic, while also praising the game's visuals and the game being free, though criticizing the game not keeping the player's attention and the sound effects that played on the game's cat background.

== See also ==
- Ring Fit Adventure
- Skipping rope
