= Videoverse =

2023 video game

- Developer: Kinmoku
- Publisher: Kinmoku
- Designer: Lucy Blundell
- Composer: Clark Aboud
- Platforms: Microsoft Windows, macOS, Linux, Nintendo Switch, PlayStation 4, Xbox Series X/S
- Release: Microsoft Windows, macOS, Linux: WW: August 7, 2023; Nintendo Switch, PlayStation 4, Playstation 5, Xbox Series X/S: WW: November 14, 2025
- Genre: Adventure
- Mode: Single-player

Videoverse is a 2023 narrative adventure game developed and published by Kinmoku. Players control a teenage gamer in 2003 and help him navigate relationships on a fictional social network dedicated to his favorite video game. Upon release, Videoverse received acclaim from critics, with reviewers highlighting the game's nostalgic imitation of early online communities and the strength of its writing, dialogue and themes. It was released on consoles in 2025.

== Gameplay ==
Players can like posts, post fan art, and communicate with friends in a retro style user interface. Players collect "Help Out" tasks to assist other characters on Videoverse, listed on a notepad.

== Plot ==
Set in 2003, players assume the role of Emmett, a fifteen year-old German boy who plays his favorite video game, Feudal Fantasy, and interacts with other fans on Videoverse, a fictional social network tied to his game console, the Kinmoku Shark. He reconnects with Markus, a fellow Feudal Fantasy player, who invites him to a community about the game on Videoverse, where he meets Vivi, a fellow user that shares Feudal Fantasy art. During Emmett's time on Videoverse, the platform experiences declining moderation and a rise in trolling and harassment. Emmett learns that Kinmoku are retiring the Videoverse services to support an online service for the new Kinmoku console, the Dolphin.

== Development ==
Kinmoku modelled Videoverse's social network on MSN Messenger and the Miiverse, a defunct Nintendo social network. The name of the game's fictional handheld console, the Kinmoku Shark, was inspired by the GameCube's codename, Dolphin. Kinmoku gave the Shark modern attributes but modelled it after various handheld consoles from the 1990s. The initial designs featured more of a shark motif, but this was simplified to make it easier to draw. It initially released on August 7, 2023, and was updated with Steam Deck support on October 13, 2023. On July 31, 2024 – in celebration of PixElated Festival and the first 'Videoversary' – Videoverse 1.2 was released, which featured new artwork, a gallery and extra drawing opportunities. Ports for Nintendo Switch, Xbox Series X/S, and PlayStation 4 & PlayStation 5 were released on 14th November 2025 by Ratalaika Games.

== Reception ==
Reception

Aggregate score
Aggregator	Score
Metacritic	90%

Review scores
Publication	Score
Edge	8/10
Hardcore Gamer	4.5/5
RPGFan	94%
The Guardian	5/5
TouchArcade	5/5

According to review aggregator Metacritic, Videoverse received "universal acclaim", and was the sixth highest rated computer game of 2023.

The game's nostalgic setting and imitation of online communities was praised. Keith Stewart of The Guardian found the game to be "achingly nostalgic" and a perfect replication of early online spaces, highlighting the game's imitation of the dynamics of fandoms and "lovely explorations of gamer culture". Edge noted the prescience of the game's themes to the Miiverse, finding the depiction of its online space was "familiar" and a "blend of earnestness, creativity and innocence. Mikhail Madnani of TouchArcade considered the game to be "the closest time capsule experience to the early 2000s internet there has ever been". RPGFan praised the game for its online setting, finding the forums to be engaging and authentic to the Internet of the author's memory, stating "there is absolutely and truly no game I've ever played that has taken me back to these days like Videoverse has". Katharine Castle of Rock Paper Shotgun considered Videoverse to tap into a "potent and nostalgic melancholy", considering it to depict an "accurate picture" of early online messaging communication and creating an "elastic and intimate-feeling" community impacted by player participation.

Videoverse was also generally praised for its writing and characterisation. Describing the game as an "engrossing, emotional study of digital relationships", Keith Stewart of The Guardian found the game's dialogue "authentic, relatable and often painful" and featuring "gently honest" and "subtly profound" moments that "perfectly explores and replicates the struggles of teenagers unable to fully express their fears and desires". Describing the game as featuring "some of the most immersive dialogue" experienced in years, Jerry Williams of RPGFan found the game's dialogue "natural" and highlighted its breadth of tactful themes relating to sexuality, family drama, disability, mental health and ageism, although found the ending could have been "better executed". Edge commended the "well-drawn" relationships, although found the game's focus on one relationship to be a "little restrictive" and considered the dialogue to feature "unnecessary" cutaways and interjections.

Videoverse won the critics' choice award at the Indie Cup UK '23 and Best Narrative at Debug Indie Game Awards 2024.
