= PlayStation 4 system software =

System software for the PlayStation 4

PlayStation 4 system software (Orbis OS)

- Operating system and user interface of the PlayStation 4 in 1.01 version
- Developer: Sony Interactive Entertainment
- Written in: C, C++ for PS Plus and online services settings / PPC
- OS family: Monolithic (BSD)
- Working state: Current
- Source model: Closed source
- Initial release: 1.01 / 15 November 2013; 12 years ago
- Latest release: 14.02 / 4 November 2026; 9 days ago
- Available in: 31 languages
- List of languages Arabic, Chinese (simplified), Chinese (traditional), Czech, Danish, Dutch, English (United Kingdom), English (United States), Finnish, French (Canada), French (France), German, Greek, Hungarian, Indonesian, Italian, Japanese, Korean, Norwegian, Polish, Portuguese (Brazil), Portuguese (Portugal), Romanian, Russian, Spanish (Latin America), Spanish (Spain), Swedish, Thai, Turkish, Ukrainian, Vietnamese
- Update method: Direct download PlayStation 4 Format Blu-ray Disc; Download to USB
- Supported platforms: PlayStation 4 (original); PlayStation 4 Slim; PlayStation 4 Pro
- Kernel type: Monolithic with dynamically loadable modules
- Default user interface: PlayStation Dynamic Menu
- Preceded by: PlayStation 3 (system software)
- Succeeded by: PlayStation 5 (system software)
- Official website: USA; EU; Japan

The PlayStation 4 system software is the updatable firmware and operating system of the PlayStation 4. The operating system is Orbis OS, based on FreeBSD 9.

== Overview ==
=== Orbis OS ===
The native operating system of the PlayStation 4 is Orbis OS, which is a fork of FreeBSD version 9.0 which was released on 12 January 2012. The software development kit (SDK) is based on LLVM and Clang, which Sony has chosen due to its conformant C and C++ front-ends, C++11 support, compiler optimization and diagnostics. Besides the kernel and related components, other components include Cairo, Lua, Mono, OpenSSL, WebKit, and the Pixman rendering library. Many of these are open-source software.

=== Graphics API ===
==== GNM ====
The PlayStation 4 features two graphics APIs, a low-level API named GNM and a high-level API named GNMX. GNMX wraps around GNM, and in turn manages the more low-level GPU details. For example, GNMX has a feature called Constant Update Engine which manages GPU constants. This simpler API is at the cost of more direct access to the GPU's features and a significant CPU cost. GNM and GNMX are analogous to Direct3D 12 and Direct3D 11, respectively.

==== PlayStation shader language (PSSL) ====
Another key area of the PS4 is its programmable pixel shaders. Sony's own PlayStation Shader Language (PSSL) was introduced to the PlayStation 4. PSSL is very similar to the HLSL standard in DirectX 12, with only subtle differences that could be eliminated mostly through preprocessor macros.

=== Graphical shell ===
The PlayStation 4 uses the PlayStation Dynamic Menu as its graphical shell, in contrast to the XrossMediaBar (XMB) used by the PlayStation Portable and PlayStation 3, as well as the LiveArea used by the PlayStation Vita and PlayStation TV. It is named "Dynamic Menu" because the options it offers to players are context-sensitive, changing based on what a player is actually doing with their PlayStation 4 at any given time. This makes navigation simpler than the previous iteration. This dynamic menu can alter itself so that there's as little time as possible between the users placing a game in the disc drive and the actual gameplay beginning.

The main place for entertainment options, the Content area, is prominently displayed with large square icons on a horizontal line arranged by the most recently used. Users can scroll through this gamer newsfeed in an alternating, brick-like formation. Many other main objects will display additional information when having the cursor selected on them. A game may have news updates or advertisements for its downloadable content. Recently played games receive tiles along with a number of mandatory items, for example the Live from PlayStation and the Internet Browser application.

== Features ==
=== Augmented reality ===
The augmented reality application, The Playroom, comes pre-installed with the PlayStation 4 console. It was demonstrated at E3 2013 and utilizes the Sony PlayStation Camera technology. The game functions by combining the light bar located on the front of DualShock 4 controller with the PlayStation Camera. Players are allowed to produce a small floating robot called Asobi, who interacts with the players, scans their faces and shoots fireballs. Once the PlayStation Camera identifies the player with the help of the light bar on the front, a flick on the touchpad of the DualShock 4 controller brings up the augmented reality Bots function of the PlayRoom, which creates the illusion that there are hundreds of little robots inside the controller, which can be released by tapping on the track pad. PS4 owners can view their smartphone or PlayStation Vita for drawing the object and flick it anywhere for the augmented reality Bots to play with. Shortly Said too, The Playroom is the "predecessor" of the well known game called Astro´s Playroom which is only playable on the Sony PlayStation 5.

=== Remote Play and second screen ===
Through Remote Play, users can operate their PS4 through the uses of a PlayStation Vita handheld game console, allowing for the play of PS4 games and other media on the small device via streaming. All games that do not require the PlayStation Move or PlayStation Camera are compatible.

The second screen can be used to display unique content when playing games that support this option, not to be confused with a split-screen. The second screen may be used to show extra content like maps, alternate camera angles, radar or playbooks in sports games. Apart from PlayStation Vita, other mobile devices such as iPads or Android tablets can also be used as a second screen. That comes in the form of both the official PlayStation App and game companion apps such as Knack's Quest.

=== Social ===
The PS4 has a number of social-centric apps and features. The What's New feature allows users to check out their friends' latest activities via a landing page with their pictures, trophies and other recent events. A live-chat feature, named Party Chat, gives users the ability to chat with other users through both text-chat and voice-chat, regardless of whether or not they're playing the same title.

PS4 owners are able to capture or livestream gameplay using the SHARE button on the Dualshock controller. This feature has the ability to record up to 60 minutes of gameplay. Footage can be shared on Facebook, Twitter and YouTube. They also have the ability to broadcast their gameplay in real-time to Twitch in addition to recording videos. This feature also supported live-streaming to Ustream, prior to the deprecation of Ustream in 2018.

There are also other social features such as community creation. Some of them were introduced via system updates. Favorite Groups is a section within the Friends app, and acts as a way to quickly access other people a user plays with the most. This feature is aimed at making it easier and faster to get into a game session with friends. On the other hand, communities are new hubs that can be formed around shared interests like games, activities, or play styles. There also exist other smaller social features on PS4, such as the ability to message a friend with a request to watch their gameplay live.

=== Internet ===
While the PlayStation 4 console can function without an Internet connection, it provides more functionality when it is connected to the Internet. For example, updates to the system software may be downloaded from the Internet, and users may play online when the Internet is properly connected. Online play is the main pillar for the PlayStation 4, but a PlayStation Plus subscription is required to play the majority of PS4 titles online, unlike PlayStation 3 titles. According to Sony, they are developing many new ways to play and connect for PS4 which requires a large investment of resources. As a result, Sony claim they cannot keep such a service free and maintain its quality at the same time considering the cost, and they thus decided that it would be better to charge a fee in order to continue to offer a good service.

The web browser included in the PlayStation 4 console is based on the open source WebKit layout engine, unlike the PlayStation 3 which uses the NetFront browser. Using the same modern Webkit core as Safari from Apple, the PS4 web browser receives a very high score in HTML5 compliance testing. However, just like other major browsers, it does not support the deprecated Adobe Flash, which means that websites which still require Flash might not display properly or function as intended. Also, the PDF format is not supported. However, one clear advantage for gamers is being able to cut between gaming and browsing and back again with no loss of gameplay due to the multitasking feature of the web browser. Additionally, while the PS4 web browser has limited support for USB keyboards, it does not seem to support USB mice at all.

Furthermore, with Internet connection enabled the PlayStation 4 allows users to access a variety of PlayStation Network (PSN) services, including the PlayStation Store, PlayStation Plus subscription service, and more. Users may download or buy games and other content from these services. Also, gamers are able to play a selection of PS3 titles via the Internet-based PlayStation Now gaming service. PS Now is a cloud-based gaming subscription service from Sony Interactive.

=== Multimedia ===
The PlayStation 4 supports playing standard 12 cm DVD-Video discs; DVD recordable and rewritable discs except those that have not been finalised; and standard Blu-ray discs with the exception of Blu-ray Recordable Erasable version 1.0 discs and Blu-ray XL format discs. Unlike all previous PlayStation consoles the system does not support the Compact Disc format at all, including Compact Disc Digital Audio and Video CD format discs. Blu-ray 3D support was added in system software version 1.75. In 2015, Sony partnered with Spotify to bring the music streaming service to the PlayStation 4, allowing music to be streamed in the background of any game or application for both free and premium members of Spotify.

The Media Player application included with the system can be used to play media files on USB storage devices or media servers. According to the PlayStation 4's user guide, media formats supported include videos contained in the MP4, MKV and AVI formats and encoded in H.264 AVC High Profile 4.2, MPEG4 ASP, MPEG2 Visual, AVCHD, and XAVC S; audio encoded in MP3, FLAC, or AAC; or AC-3 (Dolby Digital) and photos encoded in JPEG, BMP, or PNG. The PlayStation 4 Pro also supports videos encoded in H.264 AVC High Profile 5.2. If users have a PlayStation VR headset connected, they can view 360-degree videos inside the headset.

In 2023, the Sony Pictures Core video service was launched on PS4.

== Backward compatibility ==
The PlayStation 4 was not backward compatible with any games from previous PlayStation consoles at launch. Though PlayStation 4 users cannot play PlayStation 3 games directly, in 2014, the PlayStation Now cloud-based streaming service allowed for the streaming of selected PS3 games. In December 2015, Sony added PlayStation 2 backward compatibility and republished some PS2 games such as Dark Cloud and Grand Theft Auto III, Grand Theft Auto: Vice City, and Grand Theft Auto: San Andreas on the PS4 via the PlayStation Store in the Americas and Europe. Supported PS2 games run via software emulation (upscaled to high definition) on PS4 systems instead of having been remastered. Each one has been updated to access various PS4 features, including Trophies, Share Play, Broadcasting, Remote Play and second-screen features. However, the original PS2 game discs, and PS2 Classics re-released for the PS3 are not compatible with the PS4 system.

== Update history ==
The initial version of the system software for the PlayStation 4 is 1.01 as pre-installed on the original consoles. Support for the Remote Play and second screen experiences were added in version 1.50, which was launched on the same day the PlayStation 4 console itself was released in North America on 15 November 2013. Both features are accessible from the PlayStation Vita console by using its PS4 Link application, and the second screen functionality is also accessible from smartphones and tablets through the PlayStation Mobile app. It is also able to record or share video clips as well as broadcasting gameplay to Twitch or Ustream. It supports Blu-ray and DVD-Video playback, and version 1.60 was released on 4 February 2014, improving DVD playback. Version 1.60 also adds support for Pulse Elite wireless headsets. Version 1.70 was released on 30 April 2014, and adds a number of new features, such as the addition of a rich video editor called ShareFactory that offers users the tools to combine, edit and personalize captured video clips. This update also adds the abilities to share video clips and screenshots while streaming, and to copy video clips and screenshots to USB storage. Version 1.75 was released on 29 July 2014, further adding the support for playback of Blu-ray 3D. It also improves the sound quality during 1.5-speed playback with Blu-ray and DVD video.

On 2 September 2014, Sony released update 1.76 which came with minor changes and was the last update until 2.0.

On 28 October 2014, Sony released update 2.00 as a major upgrade to the PlayStation 4 system software. Among the features introduced is Share Play, which allows PlayStation Plus users to invite an online friend to join their play session via streaming, even if they do not own a copy of the game. Users can pass control of the game entirely to the remote user, or partake in co-operative multiplayer as if they were physically present. This version also adds a YouTube app and the ability to upload video clips to YouTube, and users can now play music stored on USB storage devices. Also, with the support for custom themes and the ability to change the background color, users can set themes for home screens and function screens for each user in this version.

On 26 March 2015, Sony released update 2.50, adding a suspend/resume feature to allow players to jump in and out of games with the PS button, and games are suspended in the low-power Rest Mode instead of closing completely.

This version also allows the console's hard drive to be backed up or restored to a USB flash drive.

On 30 September 2015, Sony released update 3.00. It introduced "entirely new features" and user-interface enhancements. Among the new features was the ability to share videos directly to Twitter, a dedicated PlayStation Plus section, tweaks to the interface for streaming on YouTube, improvements to social features such as messages and group creation, and the ability to save screenshots as PNGs. An increase in online storage capacity from 1 GB to 10 GB was also introduced for PlayStation Plus Members. Sony states that this update will create "new ways to connect with friends and players around the world, expanding the social capabilities of the system even further".

On 6 April 2016, Sony released update 3.50, that would enable the PS4 to use Remote Play functionality on Windows and macOS. VG247 reported that the update will allow Remote Play functionality on computers running Windows 8.1, Windows 10, OS X Yosemite, and OS X El Capitan. Furthermore, the article explains that Remote Play will support resolution options of 360p, 540p, and 720p, frame rate options of 30 FPS and 60 FPS, and that one DualShock 4 controller can be connected via the computer's USB port.

On 13 September 2016, Sony released update 4.00, which added High Dynamic Range (HDR) and home screen folder support, 1080p streaming, tweaks to menus and game info screens for greater overview, and streamlined interfaces.

On 9 March 2017, Sony released update 4.50 including support for installing applications on external hard drives, custom wallpapers, refined Quick Menu, simplified notifications list, custom status updates, 3D Blu-Ray support for the PlayStation VR and support for the preloading of game patches. However it is up to the developer to make use of it. The first game to take advantage of pre loading game patches is LittleBigPlanet 3.

On 3 October 2017, Sony released update 5.00. Overhauling the master/sub-account system, the update allows for more customisation of accounts for family members and roles, and applying parental controls to each account. The groups system is replaced with a new friends management system, along with support for 5.1 and 7.1 surround sound configurations for PlayStation VR. A new tournament bracket viewer has been made, along with tweaks to broadcasting (with 1080p streaming at 60 frames per second on Twitch now possible), and other changes to PS Message, notifications, and the quick menu. Lastly, it introduces localisation for Czech, Greek, Hungarian, Indonesian, Romanian, Thai, and Vietnamese.

5.50 was released on 8 March 2018. It includes playtime restrictions for child accounts, the ability to hide applications from the library, custom wallpapers via USB, a supersampling mode on PS4 Pro and the ability to delete notifications.

On 7 March 2019, Sony released Update 6.50 that allowed users to use Remote Play on iOS devices through the Remote Play app from the App Store, and other minor improvements.

On 10 May 2019, Sony Interactive Entertainment added the ability to remove purchased games from the Download List for PlayStation Store and delete games from My Profile.

On 8 October 2019, Sony released update 7.00. The major feature that was added was the ability to use Remote Play on select Android devices running the Android Lollipop version and above. In addition, other features include chat transcription and the expanded limit for party users from 8 to 16.

On 14 October 2020, Sony released update 8.00. It brought changes to existing Party and Message features. Other additions include new avatars, enhanced 2-step verification system and updated parental controls.

On 14 April 2021, Sony released update 8.50, which enabled cross-play between the PlayStation 4 and PlayStation 5. They also added the feature to request to join game session leaders, and more.

On 15 September 2021, Sony released update 9.00 allowing PlayStation 4 users to access PlayStation 5 trophies, improvements to parental controls and messages feature. This update also fixed the eventual cbomb issue discovered by Destruction Games that would cause PlayStation 4's to no longer be able to play physical or digital games. Controversially, it has caused serious issues for some.

On 19 February 2022, Sony released update 9.04 which claimed to have "improved system performance" and fixed issues with the game Cyberpunk 2077.

On 23 March 2022, Sony released update 9.50 with Party Feature updates and Ukrainian language support.

On 7 September 2022, Sony released update 10.00 improving Remote Play and other features.

On 21 September 2022, Sony released update 10.01 improving the system and performance.

On 9 March 2023, Sony released update 10.50 allowing access to authorized third-party apps in Settings.

The PS4 system software versions 11.00, 11.50, 11.52, 12.00, 12.02, 12.50, 12.52, 13.0, 13.02, 13.04, 13.50 and 13.52 included minor bug fixes and various system improvements.

The latest software version released is 14.02 on 4 November 2026.

== See also ==
Other gaming platforms from Sony:

- PlayStation 3 system software
- PlayStation Vita system software
- PlayStation Portable system software

Other gaming platforms from this generation:

- Wii U system software
- Xbox One system software
- Nintendo 3DS system software
- Nintendo Switch system software

Other gaming platforms from the seventh generation:

- Wii system software
- Xbox 360 system software
- Nintendo DSi system software
