= Nintendo Network =

Online service for the Nintendo 3DS and Wii U consoles (2012–2024)

- Developer: Nintendo
- Type: Online service
- Launched: 3DS: WW: January 26, 2012; 14 years ago; Wii U: WW: November 18, 2012; 14 years ago; Web: WW: April 24, 2013; 13 years ago
- Discontinued: April 8, 2024; 2 years ago
- Platforms: Nintendo 3DS family; Wii U; Web
- Status: Defunct

The Nintendo Network (Note: ニンテンドーネットワーク (Japanese: Nintendō Nettowāku)) was an online service run by Nintendo that provided free online functionalities for the Nintendo 3DS and Wii U systems and their compatible games. Launched in 2012, it was Nintendo's second online service after Nintendo Wi-Fi Connection; the Nintendo Network was not supported on the Nintendo Switch, which uses the subscription-based Nintendo Switch Online, although Nintendo Network IDs were able to be linked to the Switch via Nintendo Accounts.

The service was shut down by Nintendo on April 8, 2024, leading to functions such as online play, global leaderboards, SpotPass, and most other online features of both the Wii U and 3DS no longer being accessible. Pokémon Bank and Poké Transporter, which remained online after the initial shutdown, are set to be discontinued on February 25, 2027. The only services which remain online are system software and game updates, the limited Nintendo 3DS theme shop, friend lists, and redownloading previously purchased software from the Nintendo eShop for their respective systems. Users can also still sign into the service and link the Nintendo Network ID to a Nintendo Account.

== History ==
On January 20, 2012, an image of Theatrhythm Final Fantasy's box art was released showing a "Nintendo Network" icon in the corner of the box. It was speculated that "Nintendo Network" was a rebranding of the Nintendo Wi-Fi Connection.

Nintendo officially announced Nintendo Network on January 26, 2012. Nintendo stated that Nintendo Network would be a new unified network system as opposed to a rebranding of Nintendo Wi-Fi Connection. Nintendo stated that the Nintendo Network would provide the infrastructure for online multiplayer (through universal friend codes on the Nintendo 3DS and a user account system on the Wii U), SpotPass, and the Nintendo eShop. During the pre-E3 Nintendo Direct, Nintendo clarified that Nintendo Network would be the basis for Nintendo's then-upcoming social network known as Miiverse. Nintendo Network would provide the network infrastructure for the Nintendo 3DS, for the Wii U, and was initially planned for future Nintendo platforms.

Former president of Nintendo Satoru Iwata said, "Unlike Nintendo Wi-Fi Connection, which has been focused upon specific functionalities and concepts, we are aiming to establish a platform where various services available through the network for our consumers shall be connected via Nintendo Network service so that the company can make comprehensive proposals to consumers."

=== Discontinuation ===
On October 4, 2023, Nintendo announced the discontinuation of the Nintendo Network service for the Wii U and Nintendo 3DS by April 2024, which would shut down online play features and SpotPass. On January 23, 2024, Nintendo announced that the service would specifically shut down at 00:00 UTC on April 9, 2024. The servers were shut down at 02:00 UTC on that day. Some online services, such as Pokémon Bank and Poké Transporter and third-party games not using Nintendo Network continue to function.

Some features of the Nintendo Network had shut down earlier. Nintendo TVii in North America shut down on August 11, 2015. Miiverse, Wii U Chat, and Nintendo TVii in Japan had shut down on November 7, 2017. Most of the official streaming services have been discontinued on the 3DS and Wii U, and the Nintendo eShop for these systems closed on March 27, 2023. Previously purchased content from the Nintendo eShop remains redownloadable, and remains so for the foreseeable future. The ability to merge funds that were left on the Nintendo Network ID to a Nintendo Account ended on March 11, 2024. The ability to connect a Nintendo Network ID to a Nintendo Account also remains functional; however, the option of signing into a Nintendo Account through an NNID has been discontinued for security reasons.

After the shutdown, users that were still connected to the service were able to continue playing post-closure if their consoles remained on, with some continuing to play for over a month after the service's intended shutdown. The final player remain active for several months after the shutdown, disconnecting on November 4, 2024. Since the shutdown, there have been fanmade attempts to restore the functionality of the Nintendo Network, most notably Pretendo Network. It can be accessed with custom firmware on the Nintendo 3DS family, and either custom firmware or SSL bypassing on Wii U.

== Features ==
	Wii U	Nintendo 3DS family	Smartphones/PC/Tablets
User Information	Nintendo Network ID (up to 12 per system); User Account Profile (up to 12 per system); Personal Mii (one linked per account); Friend List (up to 100 friends); Origin support (EA-published titles only); Uplay support (Ubisoft-published titles only)	Nintendo Network ID (single account); Universal Friend Code System (Friend Card); Personal Mii (one linked per account); Friend List (up to 100 friends)	Nintendo Network ID; User Account Profile; Personal Mii (one linked per account); Friend List (up to 100 friends)
Social Network	Miiverse^{[a]}		
Games	Online multiplayer (up to five local players on Wii U and seven on Nintendo 3DS); Online leaderboards; Voice/video chat (Wii U only); Downloadable content; Demos (playable up to 30 times); Software ratings (one to five stars; various categories); Software updates/patches; Miiverse integration (available in some games)^{[a]}; Screenshot/video capture; Virtual Console		—N/a
Games	—N/a	Badge Arcade (disabled as of April 8, 2024)	—N/a
Communication	Friend List (up to 100 friends); Block List; Player History (online players met); SpotPass; Notifications	Friend List (up to 100 friends); StreetPass; StreetPass Mii Plaza (local and online players met); Swapnote (Nintendo Letter Box in PAL region); SpotPass; Swapdoodle; Notifications; Download Play	Miiverse
Communication	Cross-platform		Miiverse
Online Shop	Nintendo eShop		
Entertainment	Nintendo TVii; YNN! (JP only); Crunchyroll (NA/EU only); BBC iPlayer (UK only); TiVo (Announced, but never launched); ITV Player (UK only); Amazon Video (US only; discontinued in 2019); LoveFilm (EU only; discontinued in favor of Amazon Video)	Short Films; Recochoku (JP only); e-Reader (Japan only); Nintendo TV (ONM; not to be confused with Nintendo TVii); Nintendo Video (discontinued in 2015)	—N/a
Entertainment	Netflix (US only; discontinued in 2021); Hulu Plus (US only; discontinued in 2019); YouTube (discontinued in 2020); Niconico (JP only; discontinued in 2019 on Wii U, 2023 on 3DS)		—N/a
News	Nintendo Direct; Nintendo eShop News		—N/a
Internet Navigation	Internet Browser (Wii U) (HTML5 video and audio support)	Internet Browser (Nintendo 3DS) (3D/2D image upload support)	— (Browser required to access services)
Internet Navigation	Integrated Google/Yahoo search engine		— (Browser required to access services)
Loyalty Program	Club Nintendo; Nintendo Network Premium My Nintendo		
Other Utilities	Parental controls; eManuals; Nintendo Customer Service (video game console warranty and help/repair support); Nintendo Online Store (physical products only)		
System Update	Wii U System Update	Nintendo 3DS System Update	—N/a

Notes

- NNID on 3DS – support for Nintendo eShop free downloads and Miiverse (sign-up/login only)
- Swapnote/Nintendo Letter Box – used for local messaging only since SpotPass was disabled for the app globally on October 31, 2013, due to inappropriate images being sent to minors. In November 2016, the app was succeeded by Swapdoodle.

^[a]The Miiverse app was released on the Nintendo 3DS on December 9, 2013.

Discontinued services:

- SpotPass TV – cancelled on June 20, 2012.
- Eurosport – discontinued on December 31, 2012.
- Nintendo Show 3D – ended on March 28, 2013.
- Nintendo Video – the app was discontinued and was delisted from the eShop on March 31, 2014, in Japan and the PAL region, and June 29, 2015, in North America. However, the name continued to be used as a permanent Nintendo eShop category in North America, hosting many previous and future video content on demand.
- BBC iPlayer – delisted from the Nintendo eShop on August 31, 2016, and the app closed by January 16, 2017, for those who already downloaded it on the Wii U. The service was terminated due to the end in the licence agreement between BBC and Nintendo UK.
- Miiverse – discontinued on November 8, 2017.
- Wii U Chat – discontinued on November 8, 2017.

=== Backward compatibility ===
Nintendo Network previously provided legacy support for the Wii and Nintendo DS/DSi systems, as Nintendo Wi-Fi Connection had been absorbed into the service. This ensured the uninterrupted online support and general backwards compatibility of the Wii and DS families of game libraries when played on the Wii U and the Nintendo 3DS. The Nintendo Wi-Fi Connection service was globally discontinued on May 20, 2014, which ended support for online multiplayer, matchmaking, and leaderboards for Wii and Nintendo DS games that supported those features, and this also applies to the legacy online support of these games when played on Wii U and Nintendo 3DS, including downloadable versions. The Wii Shop Channel closed on January 30, 2019, preventing any new games, channels, or WiiWare from being purchased. Previous downloads can still be redownloaded if data from the Wii was transferred to the Wii U system.

== User information ==
=== Nintendo Network ID ===
Nintendo Network IDs (NNID) are user account systems for the Wii U and Nintendo 3DS, which allow players to access certain online features such as the Nintendo eShop and Miiverse. On December 9, 2013, Nintendo Network IDs were implemented on the Nintendo 3DS, becoming required for downloading free demos from the eShop, replacing the previous system in which eShop purchases were tied to a single system. Players who own both a Wii U and a Nintendo 3DS are able to link a single Nintendo Network ID to both systems, allowing funds added from credit cards or pre-paid cards to be shared across both systems' eShops. However, a Nintendo Network ID can only be used on one 3DS system at a time, requiring players to perform a system transfer to move account details from one 3DS system to another, IDs were tied to a single Wii U system, though a future update to resolve this had been promised, which was also essential for the company's long-term plans. Players may also sign into Nintendo Network on other platforms, such as the web-based Miiverse portal for computers, with functionality for tablets and smartphones also planned.

Nintendo originally planned for the Nintendo Network ID to become a prominent account system standard for all future Nintendo hardware releases, as well as any Nintendo-published apps released for non-Nintendo devices. However, in March 2016, Nintendo introduced Nintendo Account for non-Nintendo devices, and for the Nintendo Switch when it launched a year later, although the new account service complemented Nintendo Network ID if users had one. For example, if users linked their Nintendo Network ID to their Nintendo Account, they could share eShop funds between their Nintendo Switch and their Wii U or Nintendo 3DS.

In April 2020, credential stuffing from other breaches outside Nintendo which included NNID user and password information led to approximately 160,000 Nintendo Accounts becoming a target for malicious users that would use the NNID login to purchase digital goods via the account. By April 24, 2020, Nintendo temporarily disabled the use of NNID as a login method for Nintendo Accounts, emailed affected users to require password changes, and recommended users enable two-factor authentication. Nintendo stated in June 2020 that it found that an additional 140,000 accounts may have also been part of this same breach, bringing the total to 300,000, and had reset the passwords for all affected users and sent notifications to them.

=== Universal Friend Code system ===
Nintendo Network used a universal Friend Code system as its account system for the Nintendo 3DS. While these Friend Codes could only be registered for one user per system, they were functional for all Nintendo 3DS software used on that system. These Friend Codes initially had limited transference under a conditional online protocol. After the Nintendo Network ID (NNID) was introduced for the Nintendo 3DS in December 2013, the limit on system transfers was lifted, but both NNID accounts and Friend Codes remained tied to a single system at a time.

== Games ==
In Japan, the first games to introduce Nintendo Network officially were Theatrhythm Final Fantasy and Tekken 3D: Prime Edition, which were both released on the same day in February 2012. The first game that introduced the Nintendo Network outside Japan was Kid Icarus: Uprising, released in March 2012. Most games that were released with Nintendo Wi-Fi Connection support before the launch of the Nintendo Network were later rebranded as Nintendo Network compatible games, including Nintendo 3DS launch titles such as Nintendogs + Cats.

Nintendo Network compatible games launched alongside the Wii U in 2012. Ubisoft confirmed that Assassin's Creed III and Marvel Avengers: Battle for Earth would launch with Nintendo Network support.

=== Online multiplayer ===
Nintendo Network allowed users to play together through the Internet. Users on the Nintendo 3DS could currently play with one another by entering their friend's universal friend code into the Nintendo 3DS's friends roster. Alternatively, supported games could allow users to play on the internet without having to enter any friend codes with a feature called online communities, and it debuted in Mario Kart 7. The process of online multiplayer is further streamlined through the use of a unified user account system first available during the launch of the Wii U and later introduced on the Nintendo 3DS. The user account system would eliminate the need to enter friend codes; instead, users could enter one another's user accounts. Nintendo Network also allowed users to share rankings and to review the ranks of others.

=== Software updates ===
Software updates, more commonly known as patches, have been available on both Nintendo 3DS, since April 25, 2012, and Wii U, since November 18, 2012, via a system update. These system updates gave the ability to patch downloadable titles, as well as retail games, through both the Nintendo eShop and HOME Menu.

== Nintendo eShop ==
The Nintendo eShop (Note: ニンテンドーeショップ (Nintendō Ī-Shoppu) in Japan.) was an online marketplace provided by Nintendo Network. The eShop allowed users on the Nintendo 3DS and the Wii U to access and purchase exclusive digital games, Virtual Console games, and certain retail games. Users obtained patches and additional downloadable content for digital downloads; in-game purchases were also supported. Before purchasing a piece of software, the eShop allowed users to view ratings, screenshots, and videos pertaining to that piece of software. Developers could also release demos of both digital and physical games on the eShop.

Purchases made through the Nintendo eShop on the Nintendo 3DS are tied to the system that they were purchased from, and they can only be transferred by contacting Nintendo's customer service. On the Wii U, the user's purchases are tied to their Nintendo Network account but they cannot be transferred to other systems by the user as the Nintendo Network account is tied to a specific console. This user account system was added to the Nintendo 3DS via a system update on December 9, 2013, coinciding with Miiverse being added to the system, allowing players to combine their funds with their Wii U account.

On February 16, 2022, Nintendo announced the shutdown of the Nintendo eShop for 3DS and Wii U systems on March 27, 2023, at 8:00 pm EST. The ability to add funds was removed on August 29, 2022, at 12:30 am EST. This shutdown affected other games that used Nintendo eShop for Add-on content, such as StreetPass Mii Plaza, Nintendo Badge Arcade, Wii Sports Club, Mario Kart 8 and New Super Mario Bros. 2. Users are still able to redownload software they already purchased, download updates, and download a small number of free themes on the 3DS Theme Shop. Also on this shutdown, the Pokémon Bank application on 3DS became free-to-use, provided that it was downloaded before the shutdown. The ability to merge funds that were left on the Nintendo Network ID to a Nintendo Account ended on March 11, 2024, at 10 pm PDT.

=== Digital retail titles ===
Most Wii U and Nintendo 3DS retail software titles were available to download via the Nintendo eShop. The first of these titles was New Super Mario Bros. 2 for the Nintendo 3DS, which launched on the Nintendo eShop alongside its retail release in August 2012.

=== Add-on content ===
Add-ons include downloadable content, addition of new features, and patches. Add-on software could be added to both digital and physical games.

=== Demos ===
Game demos of retail and digital games had been available free to download on the Nintendo eShop since it was updated in December 2011. Developers are required to limit the number of plays available to the user. The first paid demo was released in Japan on August 4, 2011 and free demos were released in Japan on December 27, 2011 and in North America on January 19, 2012.

=== Virtual Console ===
Virtual Console, (Note: バーチャルコンソール (Bācharu Konsōru) in Japan.) sometimes abbreviated as VC, was a specialized section of the Nintendo eShop online service that allowed players to purchase and download games from older consoles and other software for Nintendo's Wii, Wii U, and Nintendo 3DS.

==== Wii U ====
The Wii U used the Wii U Menu and Nintendo eShop to access and purchase Virtual Console titles, respectively. Virtual Console games on the Wii U can be suspended and users can also create save states anytime. All Virtual Console games bought on the Nintendo eShop can be played on the GamePad through Off-TV Play.

The entire Virtual Console library available on Wii was also available on Wii U, but only through the implementation of the console's "Wii Mode" and Wii Shop Channel, to access and purchase Virtual Console titles.

==== Nintendo 3DS ====
The Nintendo 3DS used the HOME Menu and Nintendo eShop to access and purchase Virtual Console titles, respectively. Virtual Console games on the Nintendo 3DS can be suspended and users can also create save states anytime.

Special features in this interpretation of the Virtual Console allow players to create Restore Points, temporarily saving the game state for use later, and the optional ability to view games in their original resolution accompanied by special borders.

== Miiverse ==
Miiverse was a social network for Wii U and Nintendo 3DS, created by Nintendo System Development and Hatena powered by the Nintendo Network. It was discontinued on November 8, 2017. Integrated into every game, Miiverse allowed players to interact and share their experiences through their own Miis by way of drawings, text, screenshots, and sometimes game videos.

== Nintendo TVii ==
Nintendo TVii
- The Nintendo TVii icon and logo

- The Nintendo TVii's home page
- Developer: Nintendo i.TV
- Type: Internet television (IPTV); Video on demand
- Launched: JP: December 8, 2012; NA: December 20, 2012; EU: 2013
- Discontinued: NA/EU: August 11, 2015; JP: November 8, 2017
- Last updated: June 18, 2014
- Platform: Wii U
- Status: Defunct (Japan, North America); Cancelled (Europe/Oceania)
- Website: Official US website Official Japanese website

Nintendo TVii (pronounced as "TV") was a free television-based service which allowed users on a unified system to watch films or programs from content providers such as Hulu Plus, Netflix, Amazon Video, and their cable network. Users were then able to select the source of the program they wanted to watch and watch it on their television or on the Wii U GamePad. Users could also use the GamePad screen to display information on the show they were watching with information from websites such as Wikipedia, IMDb, Rotten Tomatoes, as well as individual source services. The information provided on the GamePad for each show included reviews, screenshots, real-time player positions in sports broadcasts, cast lists, trailers, and general information about the show.

Despite initially launching in late 2012 in select countries, development was plagued by various technical issues and delays, and the service was to launch in Europe, subsequently canceling plans to launch it in Oceania, and was later discontinued in North America and Europe by August 2015. The Nintendo TVii icon and UI access was removed from the Wii U HOME Menu with the 5.4.0E update on PAL consoles, and as of the 5.5.0U update on North American consoles. On 8 November 2017, the Japanese TVii service was discontinued, but remains on the home screen of Japanese systems.

=== Social network integration ===
Since the service was connected to the Nintendo Network ID, each user had their own personal information stored on Nintendo TVii, such as their preferences, Mii and social network accounts. Users could then interact with the information as well as share and comment on the information on social networks such as Miiverse, Facebook, and Twitter to share reactions to live moments on television through the GamePad while they watch their show on the television screen. Users were also able to control their DVR through the Wii U and the GamePad. Nintendo TVii was made by Nintendo in partnership with i.TV.

=== Integrated services ===
Nintendo TVii supported the following services:

- Hulu Plus (United States only; Japanese variant Hulu was unavailable on TVii)
- Amazon Video (United States only; European variant LoveFilm was unavailable on TVii)
- Netflix (United States only; global variants of Netflix were unavailable on TVii)

Future plans had included launching other DVRs, such as TiVo, on Nintendo TVii. It was originally announced that the service would become available in Europe in 2013. However, plans were delayed, although Nintendo UK had issued an apology in January 2014, for not launching the service when expected, and stated to expect further announcements in the "near future". On February 14, 2015, Nintendo Europe announced it had cancelled plans for the service's release in European countries including the UK.

The Wii U GamePad was also used as a universal television remote with a built-in guide, even when the Wii U was powered off. Nintendo TVii itself was installed with every Wii U console, and did not require any additional fees to use.

=== Discontinuation ===
On July 24, 2015, Nintendo announced that the service would be discontinued in North America and Europe on August 11, 2015, at 3:00 p.m. PT. Shortly after its termination, when users started Nintendo TVii, it redirected them to a screen showing them that the service had been discontinued. On August 17, a Wii U system update removed the Nintendo TVii icon from the Wii U Menu and its HOME Menu, making the service unaccessible. On August 29, 2017, Nintendo announced the service would be discontinued in Japan on November 8, 2017, at 3:00 p.m. JST.

== Video services ==
Outside of Nintendo TVii, which was only available on Wii U, Nintendo Network offered a wide range of video services for the Wii U and Nintendo 3DS. The Wii U has a resolution of up to 1080p, while the Nintendo 3DS is limited to 240p. However, these streaming services are available independently from Nintendo Network services, and available resolutions varied per service.

These videos were either downloaded to the system's permanent storage through SpotPass or streamed over the user's internet connection. On the Nintendo 3DS, many of these videos were offered in 3D; on the Wii U, only 2D videos are available. The exact content available varies by region.

All of these services have since been discontinued.

Video Content Available via Nintendo Network
Content	Free or Subscription	Wii U	Nintendo 3DS family
Standalone video services (formerly with Nintendo TVii support)
Hulu Plus (United States only)	Subscription	Terminated; No longer downloadable, shut down completely on February 20, 2019	
Amazon Video (United States only)	Free (Optional Amazon Prime subscription available)	Terminated; No longer downloadable, shut down completely on September 30, 2019	No
Netflix	Subscription	Terminated; No longer downloadable, shut down completely on June 30, 2021	
TiVo	Purchase	Cancelled	No
Standalone video services
LoveFilm (Europe only)	Subscription	Terminated	No
BBC iPlayer (United Kingdom only)	Free	Terminated; No longer downloadable, shut down completely on January 16, 2017	No
YouTube	Free	Terminated; No longer downloadable, shut down completely on October 27, 2022	Terminated; No longer downloadable, shut down completely on September 3, 2019
Nintendo Video	Free	No	Terminated; Discontinued on June 29, 2015
YNN!	Subscription	Terminated; No longer downloadable, shut down completely on November 10, 2017	No
Nico Nico Douga (Japan only)	Free	Terminated; No longer downloadable, shut down completely on November 28, 2019	Terminated; No longer downloadable, shut down completely on March 31, 2023
Crunchyroll (NA/EU only)	Free (optional subscription available)	Terminated; No longer downloadable, shut down completely on August 29, 2022	No
Online Shows
Nintendo Show 3D (North America only)	Free	No	Terminated; Nintendo Show 3D cancelled
Nintendo TV (Official Nintendo Magazine) (United Kingdom only)	Free	No	Terminated; Discontinued by Nintendo eShop's closure
Nintendo eShop News	Free	Terminated; Discontinued by Nintendo eShop's closure	
Nintendo Direct conference videos	Free	Terminated; Discontinued by Nintendo eShop's closure	
Other video services
Short Films	Free and Purchase	No	Discontinued; Previously purchased content still downloadable

Discontinued:

- SpotPass TV – cancelled on June 20, 2012.
- Eurosport – discontinued on December 31, 2012.
- TiVo – announced, but never launched.
- Nintendo Video – discontinued on June 29, 2015.
- BBC iPlayer – discontinued on January 16, 2017.
- YNN! – discontinued on November 10, 2017.
- Hulu – discontinued on February 20, 2019.
- Amazon Video – discontinued on September 30, 2019.
- Netflix – discontinued on June 30, 2021.
- Crunchyroll – discontinued on August 29, 2022.
- YouTube – discontinued on August 30, 2019, for Nintendo 3DS, and on October 27, 2022, for Wii U, however still accessible with an unofficial mod known as GiveMiiYoutube.
- Niconico – discontinued on November 28, 2019, for Wii U, and on March 31, 2023, for Nintendo 3DS.
- Nintendo eShop News, Nintendo Direct videos, Short Films, Nintendo TV – delisted on March 27, 2023.

=== Nintendo Show 3D and Nintendo TV ===
Nintendo TV was a video gaming online magazine published by Future Publishing for Nintendo Network. It was produced by the team behind the Official Nintendo Magazine and featured video reviews, previews and footage of upcoming and recently released Nintendo games. Episodes were released monthly on the Nintendo eShop, Nintendo Channel and YouTube where users could watch all the news, reviews and previews of Wii, Wii U, Nintendo DS, Nintendo 3DS and Virtual Console games. The series was exclusive to PAL region consoles.

Nintendo Show 3D was a video gaming online show produced by Nintendo and hosted by Jessie Cantrell. It featured video previews and footage of upcoming and recently released Nintendo 3DS retail and digital game titles. Episodes were released every two weeks on the Nintendo eShop free of charge. This series was exclusive to North American Nintendo 3DS consoles. Nintendo Show 3D ended on March 28, 2013.

=== Short films ===
The Nintendo eShop offered a wide range of downloadable video content for the Nintendo 3DS. These videos were mostly offered in 3D, and were downloaded right to the system's memory. In order to produce and distribute these short films Nintendo partnered with companies such as BreakThru Films, Black Box Productions, Atlantic Productions, Ka-Ching Cartoons and DreamWorks Animation. Nintendo also planned to expand this video distribution service to even larger companies like DreamWorks, producing exclusive content for the Nintendo 3DS and Wii U. Most films were removed throughout the years and the service was discontinued on March 27, 2023, with the Nintendo eShop closure.

== Chat services ==
Nintendo stated that Nintendo Network provided the means for users to chat via text, voice, and video. All three means of chatting were available on the Wii U through its Wii U Chat and Miiverse services. On the Nintendo 3DS, the Swapnote (Nintendo Letter Box) application allowed users to send handwritten notes, pictures, and sound to one another through the Nintendo Network, powered by the SpotPass delivery service. Users were also able to globally communicate with one another through the Miiverse social network service.

=== Swapnote/Nintendo Letter Box ===
Swapnote (Note: Known as Nintendo Letter Box in PAL regions and Itsu no Mani Kōkan Nikki in Japan) is a messaging application for the Nintendo 3DS. Swapnote was released on December 22, 2011, in Europe, Australia and North America via the Nintendo eShop, and could be downloaded for free and is pre-installed on newer systems. This application allowed users to send hand-written/drawn messages to registered friends via SpotPass or other users via StreetPass. The app also allowed users to freely embed pictures and sounds into their messages, and it also allowed users change the position and the orientation of the picture and sound icons. Features were unlocked as players continue to send letters, such as the ability to hand-write/draw 3D messages, with additional stationery and features unlocked by spending Play Coins. Messages sent and received could also be saved indefinitely, in spite of the 3000 message limit. Additional stationery could be obtained via certain Nintendo-related events, such as using specific software, or by saving them from other people's messages.

On October 31, 2013, Nintendo abruptly suspended the Swapnote/Nintendo Letter Box SpotPass functionality after discovering minors were sharing Friend Codes with strangers who had exploited the messaging service to allegedly exchange pornographic imagery. Additionally, the Special Notes service, which were also sent via SpotPass to promote Nintendo games, had also been suspended. Nintendo issued an apology to those who had been using the application responsibly.

=== Swapdoodle ===
Without any prior notice, Nintendo released a messaging application for the Nintendo 3DS in November 2016, titled Swapdoodle. (Note: Known in Japan as Irasuto Kōkan Nikki (イラスト交換日記; lit. "Illustration Exchange Diary")) Regarded as a spiritual successor to Swapnote/Nintendo Letter Box, the app supported the exchange of 3D messages between users online using only SpotPass, albeit with user content limited to drawings, handwritten text, icons, and native in-game screenshots. Additionally, Swapdoodle had an in-app downloadable content store, allowing users to purchase bundle packs that included additional pens, ink units, stationery, message space, and drawing lessons.

=== Wii U Chat ===
Wii U Chat was Wii U's online chat solution, powered by Nintendo Network. The service allowed users to use the Wii U GamePad's front-facing camera to video chat with registered friends. While video chatting, only the Wii U GamePad was needed, since on the television, the same picture as on the GamePad would be shown. Users could also draw on the GamePad during a chat session.

If a game or another application was already running, the Wii U GamePad's HOME button ring would flash indicating that there was an incoming call. The idea of the feature was originally seen in the introduction trailer of the Wii U in E3 2011. However, users were also able to use the service as a multitasking application, therefore not having the ability to make video calls without interrupting gameplay. Nintendo had announced a desire to make video chat possible through multitasking, but it was never implemented.

Wii U Chat was deployed on the Wii U's launch day firmware update. The feature was discontinued worldwide on December 27, 2017, at 3:00 pm JST.

== Internet navigation ==
Web technology for the Nintendo 3DS family and the Wii U is powered by NetFront NX. Previously, Nintendo partnered with Opera Software to release the Internet Channel on the original Wii, and the Nintendo DS Browser on the Nintendo DS and DSi.

=== Nintendo 3DS ===
Nintendo 3DS internet browser logo

The Nintendo 3DS Internet Browser is an Internet browser designed for the Nintendo 3DS system. It was released via firmware update on June 6, 2011, in North America and June 7, 2011, in Europe and Japan. The browser functions as a multitasking application. As such, it can be used while another application, such as a game, is suspended in the background. The browser is primarily controlled with the stylus but can be controlled with the Circle Pad or the D-pad to cycle through links on the page.

The browser itself supports HTML, CSS, JavaScript, and some HTML5 elements but does not support Flash, video, or music files. It can also show 3D image files with the .MPO file extension on the upper screen and would allow the user to save the image to the console's SD card; this can also be done with 2D JPEG files. Additionally, the browser supports file uploads on forms, limiting them to JPEG and MPO images in the system's photo gallery.

An improved browser is featured on the New Nintendo 3DS consoles, notably having a different interface and the ability to play HTML5-based videos.

=== Wii U ===
Wii U Internet Browser logo

The Wii U Internet Browser is an Internet browser designed for the Wii U system. It was released on launch day alongside Wii U via a firmware update on November 18, 2012, in North America and November 30, 2012, in Europe. The browser functions as a multitasking application and, as such, can be used while another application, such as a game, is suspended in the background. The browser is primarily controlled with the Wii U GamePad's touchscreen but can be controlled with the Analog sticks for scrolling and zoom, or the D-pad to cycle through links on the page.

The browser itself supports HTML, CSS, JavaScript, and HTML5 elements but does not support Flash, video, and music files. However, it can play HTML5 video and audio in websites such as YouTube. The browser can hide the TV screen through a "virtual curtain" (which shows the screens of the paused game), therefore allowing the user to browse the Internet with much more privacy through the GamePad. The browser can upload a screenshot of the suspended software, either from the TV or GamePad.

==== Exploit ====
The Wii U could run software, including homebrew, through the SD card with an exploit via the internet browser with a malformed form for newer updates, and a malformed video on lower versions.

== Loyalty programs ==
=== Nintendo Network Premium ===
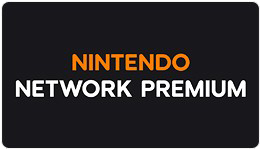

Nintendo Network Premium (known as Deluxe Digital Promotion in North America) was a loyalty program similar to PlayStation Plus offered on PlayStation Network. It was announced by Satoru Iwata on September 13, 2012, during a Japanese Nintendo Direct presentation.

Consumers who purchased the Wii U Deluxe Set in North America, a Premium Pack in Europe and Australia, or a Premium Set in Japan, received a free two-year subscription to this service which allowed Wii U owners receive points for each digital purchase. Members who bought games and apps through the Wii U Nintendo eShop received ten percent of the price back in the form of Nintendo Points, which could subsequently be put towards future online purchases on both the Wii U and Nintendo 3DS eShop. 500 points equaled $5.00 which consumers could use toward a purchase on the Nintendo eShop.

Members received points from their purchases until December 31, 2014, and could redeem these points for Nintendo eShop cards until March 31, 2015. All codes from these cards were valid until June 30, 2015.

=== Club Nintendo ===
Club Nintendo was a loyalty program available in Nintendo's key regions in which users register purchased Nintendo products in order to exchange them for a variety of unique rewards. The loyalty program was free to join and was committed to providing rewards in exchange for consumer feedback and for the original purchase of official Nintendo products. Once linked to Club Nintendo, every product downloaded through the eShop was automatically registered in the Club Nintendo account. The user could also then take a survey for each product registered to earn additional coins/stars, which then prizes could be redeemed. It was discontinued in North America on June 30, 2015, and by September 30, 2015, in all other regions, and replaced with another loyalty program called My Nintendo.

==== Rewards ====
Members of Club Nintendo could earn credits (referred to as "Coins" or "Stars" depending on region) which could be traded in for special edition items which were available only at Club Nintendo. Receiving these credits was done primarily by submitting codes found on Nintendo products and systems, and by completing related surveys provided by the Club Nintendo websites. The Club Nintendo reward items included playing cards, tote bags, downloadable and physical games, various merchandise based on Nintendo's intellectual properties, special gaming accessories, limited promotions, and warranty extensions on select Nintendo products.

== Fan revival ==
A third-party fan revival of the Nintendo Network, called Pretendo Network, is a free-and-open source replacement for Nintendo Network services. As of December 2025, Pretendo Network is still in development, with services currently available for free, and in-development games and services available through donations. As of November 18th 2026, the Pretendo Network Supports every Wii U and Nintendo 3DS Model, with limited support for emulators. The Pretendo Network supports many of the original features of Nintendo Network, progress continues quickly, any new progress will be posted on their website which can be found here. "https://pretendo.network/"

== See also ==
- Camp Hyrule, Nintendo's web-based community from 1995 to 2007, adjunct to Nintendo Power magazine
- Randnet, Nintendo's Japanese Internet dialup service and community portal, based on the Nintendo 64 and 64DD from December 1999 to February 2001
- Nintendo Wi-Fi Connection
- WiiConnect24
- Nintendo Switch Online
- Nintendo eShop
- PlayStation Network
- Xbox Live
- Nintendo Network Services, provided all Nintendo Network operations
- Nintendo System Development
