= Miiverse =

Defunct social networking service on Nintendo 3DS and Wii U

- The Miiverse icon and logo

- The Wii U version of Miiverse's home page before the redesign
- Developer: Nintendo; Hatena; Denyu-sha
- Type: Social networking service
- Launched: November 18, 2012 (Wii U); April 24, 2013 (smartphone, tablet & PC); December 9, 2013 (Nintendo 3DS)
- Discontinued: November 8, 2017; 9 years ago
- Last updated: December 10, 2015
- Platforms: Wii U; Smartphone/tablet/PC; Nintendo 3DS family
- Status: Discontinued on November 8, 2017 (all platforms)
- Website: Official website (no longer exists)

Miiverse (Note: A portmanteau of "Mii" and "universe") was a social networking service developed by Nintendo that operated from 2012 to 2017. The platform was primarily geared for use on Nintendo 3DS and Wii U, but was also available via any web browser. The service was created by Nintendo System Development and Hatena, and powered by the Nintendo Network. Miiverse was integrated into several 3DS and Wii U games, and allowed players to interact and share their experiences through handwritten messages or drawings, text, screenshots, and sometimes game videos in dedicated communities. All users who signed up for a Nintendo Network ID were automatically given a Miiverse profile per account, represented by the Mii connected to said Nintendo Network ID.

Miiverse was originally conceived during the development of the Wii U, and inspiration for its use of Miis came from the WiiWare title Wii no Ma. The service was first announced on June 3, 2012, during a pre-E3 2012 Nintendo Direct event, and it would officially launch on the launch of the Wii U on November 18, 2012. A web-based portal was opened on April 25, 2013, and a dedicated app version was originally planned for tablets and smartphones. A dedicated 3DS version of Miiverse was launched on December 9, 2013. The service was officially discontinued on November 8, 2017, at 10:00 PM PST. The platform has since had similar messaging systems in some Nintendo Switch games, and retrospectives highlight the quirky, albeit absurd nature of user interactions and posts.

== Overview ==
Miiverse allowed users to share accomplishments, comments, questions, and handwritten notes with other users. The service was integrated directly into the system menu of the Wii U and 3DS, and social interactions would also occur within supported games and applications. A user was able to suspend any game (except for Super Smash Bros. for Nintendo 3DS on original models of the 3DS) to access Miiverse functions via the 3DS or Wii U Home Menu, and then return to the game at the point it was left. Posts were divided into various "communities" dedicated to specific games, series, applications, or interests, and players could post a screenshot from a game as it was suspended to attach to their posts. Each game that was released on the 3DS and Wii U had a dedicated Miiverse community for players to share posts and screenshots.

Certain games, such as Sonic Lost World, allowed players to share in-game items with other players via Miiverse. Other games, such as The Legend of Zelda: Twilight Princess HD, let the player unlock virtual stamps that could be used in drawings on Miiverse. Several games on the Wii U, such as Super Mario 3D World and The Legend of Zelda: The Wind Waker HD had randomized sharing of posts that would appear in-game. A smaller number of titles and downloadable applications had Miiverse integration built in to the software. In August 2013, Animal Crossing Plaza was released as a Wii U eShop exclusive for users to interact with and learn more about the Animal Crossing: New Leaf game, running until the end of 2014. Super Smash Bros for Wii U included a stage dedicated to Miiverse that was made available in June 2015, exclusive to the platform, showing various posts from communities that were added to support individual characters who were included in the game.

Nintendo's president at Miiverse's launch, Satoru Iwata, stated that the network would be monitored through software as well as a human resource team to ensure that the content shared by users was appropriate and that no spoilers were shared. In addition, posting friend codes on the service was not allowed.

== History ==
Miiverse was originally conceived by Junya Kondo, then-president of Hatena, and produced by Kiyoshi Mizuki. Mizuki had been discussing the Wii U's network service during his time working on the Japanese-exclusive Wii no Ma, and had wondered about the idea of incorporating Miis into the service. After talking with several developers and employees at Nintendo, such as Kouichi Kawamoto, others gradually started to pick up on the idea, including Katsuya Eguchi and Hisashi Nogami. Nogami was previously the director of Animal Crossing who coordinated the development of the Wii U Home Menu, while Eguchi served as an advisor; both wanted to give Miiverse a "live" feeling that was previously impossible, and designed the platform around that concept. During development of the service, Hatena used a cardboard mockup of the Wii U Gamepad and a sheet of paper to simulate the experience of browsing. Iwata later described the platform as an "empathy network", stating his belief that bad behavior was less likely to occur if players were brought together using the service, as well as the service's potential in becoming a "Cloud Game Diary" where people could check on game updates from friends.

The platform was first announced on June 3, 2012, during an E3 Nintendo Direct presentation. Iwata stated that Miiverse was directly integrated into the Wii U system and its games, providing player data that could be filtered to other player's copies of Wii U games. Nintendo confirmed on June 21 that Miiverse would not be able to connect to other social media platforms like Facebook and Twitter. At launch, users reported that the service was down during certain parts of the day.

=== Updates ===
Miiverse periodically received updates that enhanced user navigation or added new features. The Miiverse Code of Conduct also occasionally changed, impacting regulations for users on the platform. Updates in 2013 expanded the service to PCs and smartphones (albeit in beta form until later updates that year), controller compatibility for the Wii Remote, Wii U Pro Controller and Classic Controller on the Wii U, and the 3DS in December. The 3DS update was announced the previous month during a Nintendo Direct presentation, but plans to integrate it to the platform were detailed earlier that year.

Following the September 11, 2013 update, users could post directly to the Activity Feed. These posts would not appear in any community, but would appear in the users', friends', and followers' activity feeds. On October 1, the Miiverse splash screen was changed that displayed the current time in major cities around the globe.

=== Redesign ===
On July 29, 2015, Nintendo released a redesign of Miiverse in order to maintain the service's focus on games. The redesign incorporated the following changes:

- Removal of the ability to post in the Activity Feed, and replacing it with a "Play Journal"
- Save up to 100 screenshots in a private album
- A daily post limit in which users could only make up to 30 posts a day
- Categorizing posts as Play Journal entries, drawings, or discussions

The redesign did not impact every community, with one notable community left unchanged being New Super Luigi U. This led to users posting anything that they wanted, within Miiverse's Code of Conduct.

=== Shutdown ===
On January 13, 2017, David Young of Nintendo of America announced that Miiverse would not release on the then-upcoming Nintendo Switch. (Note: The Nintendo Switch does not have native support for Nintendo Network IDs, which was required to use Miiverse.) In July 2017, a leak found text within Wii U firmware system update 5.5.2 suggesting that the service was soon to come to an end. On August 29, 2017, Nintendo of America announced that Miiverse would be permanently discontinued on November 8, 2017. Users could request to be sent a copy of all posts and screenshots they had made while using the service, however, replies to said posts would not be included. On October 5, Nintendo opened the "Everybody's Message" community so that users could send their goodbyes to the service, a number of which would be incorporated into a giant mosaic.

The service was shut down on November 8, 2017, at 10:00 pm PST, the same date that Wii U Chat was discontinued. The day before the service shut down, users took to X (then Twitter) with the hashtag #MiiverseMemories to reflect on the nature of the platform as well as cherished memories and artwork they had posted. The mosaic from the "Everybody's Message" community replaced the layout of the site following the shutdown.

On January 3, 2018, an unofficial archive of most of Miiverse's posts, equivalent to almost 17 terabytes, titled "Archiverse", was uploaded. The archive contains roughly 133 million posts, 217 million replies, 76 million screenshots, and 72 million drawings. The archive also contains communities created temporarily for events such as E3.

== Legacy ==
Retrospectives of Miiverse generally highlight the platform's less than serious nature with respect to its posts and how the app was used by owners of the 3DS and/or Wii U. The content on Miiverse would often be the focal point of social media posts and YouTube series making fun of it, partly contributing to nostalgia for the platform post-shutdown. One such post was made by a user who would frequently ask for guidance playing Super Metroid, asking the now infamous "y cant metroid crawl?". Publications during and after Miiverse's lifespan have also noted the platform's quirky and creative approach to social networking that made it stand out when compared to other platforms. In "Transgression in Games and Play", authors Torill Elvira Mortensen and Victor Navarro-Remesal studied different types of transgressions in Nintendo's social services, noting how certain messages and communities in Miiverse often pushed its limits and challenged the space's intention for gaming discussions. One example they noted, which was also mentioned by Patricia Hernandez of Kotaku in 2015, was a trend called "Miiverse After Dark", where users would spam the platform with Rule 34 content when moderation was less active.

Miiverse was the inspiration for the indie game Videoverse, released on Steam in 2023. The platform was referenced in The Super Mario Bros. Movie, with an in-universe plumbing website referencing a user who would note the various graphics of water in Wii U games. After a change to the social media site X where the Likes tab became hidden from other users, in June 2024, users began replying to an image of the "Yeah!" button, similarly used on Miiverse to the "like" button, to tweets to publicly "like" said tweets.

Certain games on Nintendo Switch such as Splatoon 2, Splatoon 3 and Super Mario Maker 2 include community messaging features that are reminiscent of Miiverse's handwritten message/drawing function. In 2024, Miiverse features were partially restored through the Pretendo Network, an unofficial open-source private server for Wii U and 3DS consoles.
