= Pokémon Bank =

Nintendo 3DS software

- Developers: Game Freak; The Pokémon Company
- Release: JP: December 25, 2013; EU: February 4, 2014; NA: February 5, 2014
- Platform: Nintendo 3DS
- Type: Utility
- Website: www.pokemonbank.com

Pokémon Bank is an application for the Nintendo 3DS which was downloadable from the Nintendo eShop before the discontinuation of the storefront's capabilities for the 3DS. (Note: While the eShop does not allow new downloads since the discontinuation of purchasable software in March 2023, it does allow redownloads.) Pokémon Bank allows players to store up to 3,000 Pokémon in an online cloud storage service. Players can deposit and withdraw Pokémon from both physical and downloaded versions of compatible games, allowing players to exchange Pokémon between them. An additional application called the Poké Transporter has connectivity with the software, allowing the transfer of Pokémon from Pokémon Black and White and its sequels to Pokémon X and Y and Pokémon Omega Ruby and Alpha Sapphire. After the release of Pokémon Sun and Moon, the software was updated to be compatible with it. Once a Pokémon had been deposited into these newer titles, it could not be transferred back to its original game. The service is scheduled to end on February 25, 2027 at 19:00 PST.

== History ==
Through a variety of methods, Pokémon could be transferred between games. Pokémon Bank and Pokémon Home "streamlined" the process through the utilization of a cloud storage service. One example is that Pokémon from Pokémon Ruby and Sapphire could be sent to Pokémon Diamond and Pearl through the "Pal Park" and then to Pokémon Black and White through the "Poké Transfer" processes. Pokémon Bank originally released in Japan on December 25, 2013, but it was removed shortly thereafter due to issues with the Nintendo Network. These issues were caused by unforeseen traffic levels and technical difficulties resulting from the eShop merging account balances. This caused a delay in the release of Pokémon Bank in other countries and a temporary removal of the software from Japan. Additionally, the Poké Transporter was also updated to allow players to transfer Pokémon caught in the Virtual Console editions of Pokémon Red, Blue and Yellow to Pokémon Sun and Moon. The update also added an in-app National Pokédex, a feature that was not present in Sun and Moon.

Upon its release, Pokémon Bank had an annual subscription fee, with a free trial option. At some point after the expiration of an annual subscription, Pokémon that were still stored within the application would be deleted. In March 2023, the Nintendo 3DS discontinued the ability to download and purchase new software titles from its eShop. People who had already downloaded Pokémon Bank before the shop's closure could continue to use the software for free, but new users could not download the application. The successor to Pokémon Bank is Pokémon Home, with Pokémon transferred to Home being unable to be returned to Bank. Pokémon Bank initially continued to work after Nintendo ended support for online connectivity on the Nintendo 3DS on April 8, 2024, but it was announced on August 13, 2026 that the service is set to end on February 25, 2027 at 19:00 PST.
