= SpotPass and StreetPass =

Connectivity for Nintendo 3DS and Wii U

SpotPass (Note: Japanese: いつの間に通信, Hepburn: Itsunomani Tsūshin; lit. 'Unnoticed Communication') and StreetPass (Note: Japanese: すれちがい通信, Hepburn: Surechigai Tsūshin; lit. 'Passing By Communication') are communication systems first introduced in the Nintendo 3DS, with the former later being incorporated into the Wii U home video game console. SpotPass delivered content over the Internet, while StreetPass uses local Wi-Fi functionality to exchange data between 3DS systems.

== SpotPass ==
SpotPass
- Developer: Nintendo
- Type: Online service
- Launched: February 26, 2011 (Nintendo 3DS); November 18, 2012 (Wii U)
- Discontinued: April 8, 2024 (Note: April 9, 2024 at 00:00 UTC)
- Platforms: Nintendo 3DS family; Wii U
- Status: Discontinued

SpotPass was a Nintendo 3DS and Wii U "always on" online background connectivity system similar to that of WiiConnect24 for the Wii, which could automatically seek and connect to wireless network nodes such as Wi-Fi hotspots, sending and downloading information in the background while in sleep mode or while playing a game or running an application. It could be customized to fit the user's preferences, including opting out of it altogether for selected software. One application was being considered to use this functionality to "automatically acquire magazine and newspaper articles", similar to networked e-book reader applications.

=== Nintendo 3DS ===
Full WiFi connectivity requires the Nintendo 3DS to be properly connected to a Wi-Fi connection via its settings, but SpotPass can be obtained automatically and passively. When new data is received from SpotPass and the system is in sleep mode, the notification LED of the system will turn blue and will remain blue until the system is taken out of sleep mode. When SpotPass data is received while the system is not in sleep mode, the notification LED will blink blue a few times before returning to being off. During the 2011 Game Developers Conference, Nintendo of America president Reggie Fils-Aimé announced a partnership with AT&T to provide access to AT&T hotspots via the Nintendo 3DS. Users can connect to these hotspots automatically and free of charge. SpotPass also makes uses of certified hotspots to access an application called Nintendo Zone. In the Nintendo Zone application, users can view game trailers, game screenshots, and information about current and upcoming Nintendo 3DS titles. After leaving the hotspot, although the app remains on their Nintendo 3DS system, the player becomes unable to access it.

=== Wii U ===
Similar to Nintendo 3DS's more distinctly mobile SpotPass functionality, the SpotPass feature on Wii U allowed the system to automatically download available content via the Internet in the background, while the system is in use or in sleep mode. When the system is transmitting while in sleep mode, the system light will turn orange. Content that can be downloaded via SpotPass includes full game and application downloads, firmware updates, patches, and specific in-game content. Content currently being downloaded can be viewed in the Download Manager, accessed via the Wii U's Home Menu.

=== Discontinuation ===
On October 4, 2023, Nintendo announced that the SpotPass service (alongside the related Nintendo Network service) would be discontinued sometime in April 2024. This was later revealed to be April 8, 2024 with a shutdown time of 5pm PDT (00:00 UTC on April 9, 2024) in a recent update to the original announcement. SpotPass (and Nintendo Network) was discontinued as planned on the exact date and time that was mentioned in the updated announcement, ending all internet data exchange functionality and communication for the 3DS and Wii U systems.

== StreetPass ==
StreetPass
- Developer: Nintendo
- Type: Passive communication
- Launched: February 26, 2011
- Platform: Nintendo 3DS family
- Status: Active

Nintendo 3DS consoles signal their StreetPass interaction with green blinking LEDs.

StreetPass is a Nintendo 3DS functionality which allows passive communication between Nintendo 3DS systems held by users in close proximity, an example being the sharing of Mii avatars in the StreetPass Mii Plaza application, and other game data. Similar to SpotPass in the Nintendo 3DS, when new data is received from StreetPass and the system is in sleep mode, the notification LED of the system will turn green and will remain green until the system is taken out of sleep mode; when StreetPass data is received while the system is not in sleep mode, the notification LED will blink green a few times before returning to being off.

StreetPass allows users to exchange software content from select games played on their system, regardless of what software is currently in the console. StreetPass functionality must be activated for each piece of compatible software and can be disabled by parental controls. Currently shared content is stored in one of twelve "data slots" in the console. Using this data slot, Nintendo 3DS users can readily share and exchange content for multiple games at the same time, whenever they are connected. Using the console's background connectivity, a Nintendo 3DS in Sleep Mode can automatically discover other Nintendo 3DS systems within range, establish a connection, and exchange content for mutually played games, all transparently and without requiring any user input. For example, in Rhythm Heaven Megamix, if the user passes by someone with the same software, they will take on a figure-fighting duel challenge. Each game can only hold a certain number of StreetPass exchanges, requiring the player to check their game software before additional exchanges can be made (for example, StreetPass Mii Plaza can only hold ten visitors at a time).

Trademarks suggested that this functionality would be named "CrossPass", but on September 29, 2010, during the Nintendo World conference, the name of the Tag Mode service was confirmed to be StreetPass.

After the discontinuation of online services for the 3DS and Wii U on April 8, 2024 (which includes SpotPass and Nintendo Network), StreetPass remains as the only communication service available on the platform due to it using local communication instead of online communication like SpotPass. However, certain StreetPass-enabled titles that had online communication features such as StreetPass Mii Plaza will have their online capabilities nonfunctional due to those requiring the already-discontinued SpotPass feature.

=== StreetPass Mii Plaza ===
StreetPass Mii Plaza is a built-in application included with every Nintendo 3DS family device and the primary application for StreetPass interactivity. Here, players can set up their Mii to appear on other 3DS devices that it encounters via StreetPass. Up to ten Miis can be brought into the plaza at a time and taken into various minigames.

=== StreetPass Relay ===
StreetPass Relay was announced during an analyst briefing at E3 2013, where Nintendo announced that it was creating thousands of new StreetPass Relay stations across the United States and Europe. Nintendo planned to turn over 29,000 Wi-Fi access points into relays in the US, while Europe would see approximately 30,000. With this network, Nintendo aimed to vastly improve the functionality of the 3DS and enable players to find more Miis in their StreetPass Mii Plaza. It was powered by Hbase, Puppet, fluentd, and Amazon Web Services cloud technologies.

StreetPass Relay points were located at Nintendo Zones all across the country. When a Nintendo 3DS user got near a StreetPass Relay point, it automatically forwarded their StreetPass data to Nintendo's servers which stored it temporarily to pass it on to the next Nintendo 3DS user to pass by the same relay point. The Nintendo servers kept track of each relay point by the MAC address of the node. StreetPass Relay points supported StreetPass data for various games each time a Nintendo 3DS user passes by. This meant the user could get StreetPass data for several games at once.

On March 28, 2018, StreetPass Relays worldwide were shut down, with the exception of Best Buy locations in Canada.
