= Nintendo Badge Arcade =

2014 video game

- Opening Menu showcasing the Arcade adorned with many Nintendo characters
- Developer: Nintendo SPD
- Publisher: Nintendo
- Director: Shohei Mizutani
- Producer: Kouichi Kawamoto
- Designers: Hiromi Sugimoto; Koji Sonoyama
- Programmers: Hirotake Matsushita; Masanori Unno
- Artists: Koji Sonoyama; Hiromi Sugimoto; Arisa Yanagi
- Writers: Atsuto Yagi; David Davoodi; Paul Merrill
- Composers: Masato Onishi; Daisuke Matsuoka
- Platform: Nintendo 3DS
- Release: JP: December 17, 2014; NA: November 10, 2015; PAL: November 13, 2015
- Genre: Miscellaneous
- Mode: Single-player

Nintendo Badge Arcade, known in Japanese as Badge Torēru Center (バッジとれ〜るセンター, Bajji Torēru Sentā; lit. "Collectible Badge Center"), was a freemium application developed by Nintendo for the Nintendo 3DS, allowing players to customize the 3DS home menu with badges. The game launched in Japan in December 2014, and worldwide in November 2015.

Gameplay consisted of playing arcade crane-like games in hopes of acquiring badges, the game's main collectable. Badges were usually themed around other Nintendo properties, and once collected could be used to apply in the 3DS' HOME Menu. In addition to being decorative, some badges had special functions to them, such as launching applications and were compatible in other software as well.

In 2017, due to constraints on the size of software save data, updates to the service were discontinued, although the service itself was still operational. With the closure of the Nintendo 3DS eShop in March 2023, it was no longer possible to buy additional plays and themes, as well as receive daily free plays, but it was still possible to receive free plays from the game's Practice Catcher, and play for a limited range of badges that were remaining. The game shut down in April 2024 due to the discontinuation of online play on 3DS and Wii U, and the player is now met with an error message if they try to play the game.

== Gameplay ==
Nintendo Badge Arcade took place in an arcade filled with machines known as badge catchers, where each contained badges based on various Nintendo franchises such as Super Mario, Animal Crossing, The Legend of Zelda, Splatoon, and Pokémon (as well as third-party franchises such as Yo-kai Watch and Mega Man) which were reorganised regularly. The arcade was hosted by a pink, anthropomorphic rabbit character called Arcade Bunny, who always greeted the player, and often introduced promotional events. The badge catchers were viewed from a 2-D side-on perspective. Similar to real-life claw machines, players moved the catcher's crane using a button, picked up badges, and tried to drop them off into a prize pit. They could accomplish this by simply picking them up, or use other techniques such as pushing them or causing landslides (this only worked if there is a big pile of badges). Most badge catchers used a claw to pick up the badges, but some badge catchers used alternate means of obtaining badges. The hammer crane knocked badges to the right, the explosive crane blasted badges away in all directions, and the stick crane (which originally went unused, but was first revealed in April 2016 in Japan) used an extendable arm to move the badges. Any badges that the player obtained could place on the Nintendo 3DS's HOME Menu, with certain badges able to launch some of the 3DS's built-in applications. Most badges were also used as decorations for the Swapdoodle messaging app.

First-time players began the game with five free plays, after which they would purchase additional plays via the Nintendo eShop. Special themes for the HOME Menu, and one set of badges based on Arcade Bunny, could also be unlocked by purchasing enough plays during certain periods. Once per day, players used the Practice Catcher to practice catching dummy badges. Players earned a free bonus play for every ten dummy badges they collected, plus additional plays in the instance that they uncovered a bonus badge. Prior to the discontinuation of updates in 2017, additional plays could be available to the player through occasional events. Since discontinuing the updates, the game gave players two additional plays as a daily log-in bonus. These additional plays must have been used when the game is loaded. This required a constant online connection as obtained badges were cloud saved via users' Nintendo Network ID.

The ability to purchase plays for the Badge Catchers, purchase themes, and receiving the daily log-in bonus ended in March 2023, due to the closure of the Nintendo 3DS eShop. The players could still earn free plays by playing the Practice Catcher at the time, and play through a limited selection of badges that never rotated. The service shut down in April 2024, coinciding with the shutdown of the Nintendo Network. Badges that were earned through the Badge Catchers must have been downloaded to the 3DS console and placed in the Badge Box before then, as the player will not be able to re-download the badges should the player's SD card corrupt or break. Since it has shut down, it will show an error message, making the software unusable.

== Reception ==
Reception

Aggregate score
Aggregator	Score
Metacritic	56/100

Review score
Publication	Score
Nintendo World Report	6/10

Nintendo Badge Arcade has received "mixed or average reviews", according to the review aggregator website Metacritic.

== Legacy ==
Arcade Bunny appears in Super Smash Bros. Ultimate as an Assist Trophy and Spirit. Two music tracks from this game are also included, being the title theme and Arcade Bunny's theme.

In the free Nintendo Switch eShop game Jump Rope Challenge, the Arcade Bunny appears as one of the outfits the players can use in game.

In WarioWare! Get It Together, there is a microgame featuring the badge catcher.
