= Wii U system software =

Operating system for Nintendo's Wii U home video game console

- The default user interface of the Wii U operating system features two separate home screens. Top Screen: WaraWara Plaza Menu Bottom Screen: Wii U Gamepad Menu
- Developer: Nintendo
- Written in: C, C++
- OS family: Nintendo proprietary
- Working state: Discontinued
- Source model: Closed source
- Initial release: 1.0.1 / November 18, 2012; 13 years ago
- Latest release: 5.5.6U (Note: NTSC markets only) / August 29, 2022; 5.5.5E (Note: PAL markets only) / 2 March 2021; 5.5.5J (Note: For Japanese consoles only) / March 2, 2021; 5 years ago
- Available in: Dutch; English (United Kingdom); English (United States); French (Canada); French (France); German; Italian; Japanese; Portuguese (Brazil); Portuguese (Portugal); Russian; Spanish (Latin America); Spanish (Spain)
- Update method: Direct download Wii U Optical Disc
- Supported platforms: Wii U
- Default user interface: Wii U Menu
- License: Proprietary
- Preceded by: Wii system software
- Succeeded by: Nintendo Switch system software
- Official website: en-americas-support.nintendo.com/app/answers/detail/a_id/1436/~/system-menu-update-history

The Wii U System Software, also known internally as Cafe OS, is the official operating system used for the Nintendo's Wii U home video game console. Nintendo maintains the Wii U's systemwide features and applications by offering system software updates via the Internet. Updates are optional to install, but may be required in order to retain interoperability with Nintendo's online services. Each update is cumulative, including all changes from previous updates.

The system's official integrated development environment, named MULTI and published by embedded software engineering vendor Green Hills Software, is intended for use by Nintendo and its licensed developers in programming the Wii U. Details of the operating system's internal architecture have not been officially publicized.

The Wii U operating system is split into 2 parts: One, normally displayed on the Wii U GamePad upon startup is the Home Menu, acting as an application organizer and launcher. It is a graphical shell similar to the Wii's "Wii Menu" and Nintendo 3DS HOME Menu. It allows launching software stored on Wii U optical discs, applications installed in the internal memory or an external storage device, or Wii titles through the system's "Wii Mode". The other, officially named the "WaraWara Plaza" is displayed on the TV screen. It displays the 8 most popular Miiverse communities and posts in a layout similar to the Mii channel's Mii Plaza on the Wii. The two screens' display roles can be swapped with the press of a button.

Like the original Wii, discs can also be hot-swapped while in the menu. The Wii U Menu may also be used to launch applications entirely beyond just gaming: the Miiverse social network which is integrated with all games and applications; the Internet Browser for the World Wide Web; play media through Netflix, Amazon Video, Hulu, YouTube, and more; download Wii U software and content through the Nintendo eShop; and receive official notifications from Nintendo. System settings, parental controls and the activity log can also be launched through the menu.

== Wii U Menu ==
=== WaraWara Plaza ===
The Wii U Menu is directly integrated with Miiverse and the Nintendo Network. When the Wii U powers on, the television screen shows the WaraWara Plaza in which user status and comments on Miiverse are shown. Each user is represented by their respective Mii and was associated with a Miiverse community. Users could save any Mii on the WaraWara Plaza to their personal library, like their posts (with a "Yeah!"), write a comment, and send a friend request. Since Miiverse is discontinued, the WaraWara Plaza now only shows the built-in tips from Nintendo usually meant for offline users.

=== Home Menu ===
The Home Menu (stylized as HOME Menu) can be accessed during any game or application through the user pressing the Home Button on the Wii U GamePad, Wii U Pro Controller or Wii Remote. The Home Menu allows the user to launch certain multitasking applications, such as Miiverse, Nintendo TVii, Nintendo eShop, and the Internet Browser while a game or application is running. It also displays various information such as date and time, the wireless signal status, controller battery life and controller settings. Current downloads can also be managed in the Download Manager (or in Notifications), which downloads and installs games and applications and their respective updates, as well as downloading system updates in the background.

=== Pre-installed software ===
==== Nintendo eShop ====
The Nintendo eShop is Nintendo's online digital distribution service, serving the Wii U, the Nintendo Switch, and the Nintendo 3DS handheld console. The eShop provides downloadable Wii U software titles (both retail and download only), Wii games, Virtual Console games, trial versions (demos), and various applications. It also allows users to purchase downloadable content (DLC) and automatically download patches for both physical and downloadable games. All content obtained from the Nintendo eShop is attached to a Nintendo Network ID but can only be used in one system. The Wii U allows background downloading via SpotPass, either while playing a game or application or in sleep mode. Up to ten downloads can be queued at a time and their status can be checked on the Download Manager application. A pop-up notification will appear on the Home Menu section to notify the user that a download is finished.

Unlike past Nintendo digital stores, such as the Wii Shop Channel and the Nintendo DSi Shop, which used Nintendo Points as its currency, the Nintendo eShop uses the user's local currency using a digital wallet system whereby funds are added to and debited from the wallet. The user can add funds to their wallet in a number of ways either by credit or debit card or by purchasing Nintendo eShop cards. It is also possible to purchase download codes from select retailers and later redeem them on the eShop. On July 22, 2014, the Japanese Nintendo eShop was updated to support digital money cards to add funds to the user account's digital wallet via near field communication (NFC) on the Wii U GamePad. These cards are embedded with IC chips and are typically used to buy train or bus tickets as well as make purchases at convenience stores.

The Nintendo eShop supports user software reviews. Users can submit a review with "stars" ranging from one to five, representing its quality in a crescent order. It is also possible to categorize the software on whether it is suitable for hardcore or for more casual players. Reviews can only be submitted after the software in review has been used for at least one hour.

The ability to purchase content through the Nintendo eShop was discontinued on March 27, 2023.

==== Miiverse ====
Miiverse (portmanteau of "Mii" and "Universe") was an integrated social networking service, which allowed players to interact and share their experiences through their own Mii characters. Miiverse allowed users to seamlessly share accomplishments, comments hand written and game screenshots notes with other users. Select games were integrated with Miiverse, where social interactions could also occur within the game. Miiverse was moderated through software filtering as well as a human resource team in order to ensure that the content shared by users was appropriate and that no spoilers were shared. In order to facilitate this, it was stated that comments posted could take up to 30 minutes to appear on Miiverse.

On April 25, 2013, Miiverse also became available on web browsers for internet-enabled smartphone, tablet and PC devices. It later became available for the Nintendo 3DS in December 2013. It was discontinued on November 8, 2017, along with Wii U Chat.

==== Internet Browser ====
Internet Browser allows users to browse the web on the Wii U GamePad and/or the television screen. It functions as a multitasking application on the Wii U, so it can be used while another game or application is suspended in the background. The browser is primarily controlled using the Wii U GamePad's touchscreen, or with the analog stick to scroll through web pages and the D-pad to cycle through links on the page, similar to using a keyboard. It can play HTML 5 video and audio in websites such as YouTube and various other social media. The user can choose to hide the browser's view on the TV screen for privacy, which contains presentation effects such as the opening of stage curtains. The user can also choose between the Google and Yahoo! search engines. There is a text wrap option to automatically wrap text to the width of the screen at different zoom levels. Users can also create bookmarks, with each user having its own set of personal bookmarks. The browser supports up to six tabs simultaneously. Up to 32 pages can be stored into the browser's history before the older items start being replaced.

==== Nintendo TVii ====
Nintendo TVii (pictured) was discontinued in 2015 in North America due to low users.

Nintendo TVii was a free television-based service which allowed users to find programs on Netflix, Hulu Plus, Amazon Video, and on their cable network. Nintendo TVii also allowed users to control their TiVo DVR through the Wii U. Users were then able to select the source of the program they wanted to watch and watch it on their television or on the Wii U GamePad. By default, the GamePad screen showed information on the show currently being watched. This information included reviews, screenshots, cast lists, trailers, and other general information about the show provided by English Wikipedia, IMDb, Rotten Tomatoes, as well as other individual source services. Nintendo TVii also had a dedicated sports section where the user could view player positions and highlights of the match, updated in real-time.

Each user had their own personalized settings on Nintendo TVii, such as favorite shows and sports teams, their personal Mii, and any social network account integration. Users could then interact with friends and the community by sharing and commenting on reactions to live moments on the current show, on social networks such as Miiverse, Facebook, and Twitter, through the GamePad while the show played on the television screen.

Nintendo TVii was made available with the Wii U's release in Japan on December 8, 2012. It was released in North America on December 20, 2012 and was scheduled to be released in Europe sometime in 2013, but was never fulfilled. Nintendo UK later issued an apology and stated to expect further announcements in the "near future". However, on February 14, 2015, Nintendo Europe officially confirmed that they had cancelled plans for the service's release in European countries "due to the extremely complex nature of localising multiple television services across a diverse range of countries with varied licensing systems".

It was discontinued in the US on August 11, 2015, and removed from the Home Menu shortly after. It was discontinued in Japan on November 8, 2017, along with Miiverse and Wii U Chat.

==== Other streaming service apps ====
Nintendo worked with YouTube, LoveFilm (United Kingdom and Ireland only), Nico Nico Douga and YNN! (Japan only) to bring streaming movie and television content to the Wii U. Nintendo had initially delayed the deployment of some media capabilities for the Wii U as it delayed its online infrastructure. Late in the launch day, a firmware update deployed the Netflix app. Then, access to the Hulu Plus, Amazon Video, and YouTube apps gradually became active later in the launch week. On December 25, 2014, and without prior notice, Crunchyroll launched their eponymous app for the North American Wii U eShop, and was later released for PAL systems by January 8, 2015. Initially, despite being free to download, the content on the Crunchyroll app was only accessible to Premium account users, but this has since been fixed to allow access of all Crunchyroll members. After a long delay and without prior notice, as of May 28, 2015, users with access to the Nintendo eShop for the United Kingdom can download the BBC iPlayer app. On December 17, 2015, also without prior notice, the music streaming app Napster was released on the Wii U for eligible European countries, and the app was later released in the United States on March 11, 2016, under the Rhapsody name.

==== Wii U Chat ====
Wii U Chat (pictured) was often compared to Skype due to video calling.

Wii U Chat was Nintendo's online video chat solution, powered by the Nintendo Network. The service allowed players to use the Wii U GamePad's front-facing camera to video chat with registered friends. Video chatting could be done entirely on the Wii U GamePad, enabled by the application's support for Off-TV Play. Users could draw pictures on the GamePad to appear on top of the video chat display. If a game or another application was already running, the GamePad's HOME button ring would flash to indicate an incoming call.

The service was discontinued on November 7, 2017, along with Miiverse and TVii.

==== Wii Mode ====
Wii Mode is a fully virtualized Wii system, relaunching the Wii U to entirely become exactly like a Wii until it is relaunched into native mode. When a Wii game disc is inserted into the Wii U, an appropriate launchable icon appears on the Wii U Menu. Alternatively, the Wii U may be powered on while holding the B button. As with a native Wii system, the Wii Mode's internal storage memory is limited to 512 MB, and the SD Card Menu can utilize a card up to 2TB. This appears on the Wii U menu as a game, not an application.

There are a few slight differences between the Wii U's Wii Mode and a native Wii system. The data management settings are accessible, but the Wii System Settings are not. The Wii Shop Channel is fully available for the purchase of Wii software; however, its Netflix, Hulu Plus, and YouTube applications cannot be used. The system must be relaunched into Wii U mode, in order to utilize the native versions of these applications.

==== Other software ====
- Health & Safety Information
- User Accounts
- Wii U optical disc launcher
- Activity Log
- Parental Controls
- System Settings

== History of updates ==
The Wii U launched with its system software at either version 1.0.1 or 1.0.2. An update released on the same day added a web browser, Miiverse, a method of transferring data from a Wii, and a sandboxed way for owners to play Wii games, but not GameCube games. On April 25, 2013, a major new update at version 3.0 improved system loading times and added automatic installation of downloaded software. Version 4.0 released on September 30, 2013, added further features such as the ability to plug a headset directly into the GamePad for Wii U Chat, the ability to take screenshots and upload them through the web browser during gameplay, and support for USB keyboards and surround sound for Wii games. On June 2, 2014, another major update with version number 5.0 was released, with added abilities to display a Quick Start Menu and Wii U GamePad Alerts in addition to other changes. The version that immediately followed (5.1.0) added the support for Wii U to Wii U System Transfer.

== See also ==
- List of Wii U games

Other gaming platforms from Nintendo:

- Wii system software
- Nintendo Switch system software
- Nintendo 3DS system software
- Nintendo DSi system software

Other gaming platforms from this generation:

- PlayStation 4 system software
- Xbox One system software
- PlayStation Vita system software

Gaming platforms from the seventh generation:

- PlayStation 3 system software
- PlayStation Portable system software
- Xbox 360 system software
