= Nintendo Switch system software =

Operating system for the Nintendo Switch and Nintendo Switch 2

- Top: Home screen of the Nintendo Switch in the Basic White theme as of April 2025; Bottom: Home screen of the Nintendo Switch 2 in the Basic Dark theme as of February 2026
- Developer: Nintendo; HAL Laboratory
- Written in: C, C++ and HTML for eShop and online services settings
- OS family: Proprietary, derivative of the Nintendo 3DS system software (containing components which are based on FreeBSD and Android)
- Working state: Current
- Source model: Closed source
- Initial release: 1.0.0 (March 3, 2017; 9 years ago)
- Latest release: 23.0.1 (September 30, 2026; 25 days ago) [±] 19.0.2 (January 20, 2026; 9 months ago) (Tencent Nintendo Switch only)
- Available in: Chinese (Simplified); Chinese (Traditional); Dutch; English (United Kingdom); English (United States); French (Canada); French (France); German; Italian; Japanese; Korean; Portuguese (Brazil); Polish; Portuguese (Portugal); Russian; Spanish (Latin America); Spanish (Spain); Thai
- Update method: Direct download Nintendo Switch Game Card
- Supported platforms: Nintendo Switch; Nintendo Switch Lite; Nintendo Switch OLED; Nintendo Switch 2
- Kernel type: Microkernel
- Preceded by: Nintendo 3DS system software Wii U system software
- Official website: support.nintendo.com

The Nintendo Switch system software (also known by its codename Horizon) is an updatable firmware and operating system used by the Nintendo Switch and Nintendo Switch 2 hybrid video game consoles. It is based on a proprietary microkernel, which was derived from the Nintendo 3DS' system software. Nintendo offers software updates through its servers and physical Game Cards to improve functionality, add new features, and fix known issues while allowing the user to maintain access to online features.

The Switch's user interface (UI) was simplified compared to the preceding Wii U and aforementioned 3DS. It includes the game library organized in a horizontal row, with numerous additional options and shortcuts underneath and profile pages above. Games may be launched through Game Cards or through digital downloads obtained through the Nintendo eShop, obtain news articles for purchased titles, view video captures and screenshots, view perks for an active Nintendo Switch Online subscription, launch GameShare and GameChat, the latter on the Nintendo Switch 2, pair new controllers, change system settings or view all installed applications.

== Technology ==
=== Operating system ===
The Switch operating system is an evolution of the Nintendo 3DS system software, and it implements a proprietary microkernel architecture. All drivers run in userspace, including the Nvidia driver which the security researchers described as "kind of similar to the Linux driver". The graphics driver features an undocumented thin API layer, called NVN, which is "kind of like Vulkan" but exposes most hardware features like OpenGL compatibility profile with Nvidia extensions. All userspace processes are sandboxed and use Address Space Layout Randomization (ASLR), a computer security technique involved in preventing exploitation of memory corruption vulnerabilities.

Nintendo made efforts to design the system software to be as minimalist as possible, with the home menu's graphical assets using less than 200 kilobytes. This minimalism is meant to improve system performance and launch games faster.

As early as July 2018, Nintendo has been trying to counter Switch homebrewing and piracy. Measures include an online ban, and on the hardware side, patching of the Tegra SoC to prevent exploits. On December 11, 2018, Nintendo sued Mikel Euskaldunak for selling a Switch modification that allows for pirated games to be played on the console. Since August 2019, the difficulty of homebrewing has gone up, as the new Mariko chip replaced the old Erista chip. After the release of the Lite in late 2019, tools for hacking all Switch consoles were announced. In September 2020, Gary Bowser, a Canadian hacker associated with video game console modding groups, was arrested in the Dominican Republic, and later appeared in court in the USA afterwards. The prosecution alleges that Bowser was a piracy group leader.

=== Open source components ===
Nintendo's use of FreeBSD networking code is legal as it is made available under the permissive BSD license, and not even particularly unusual – for instance and interface, the Microsoft Windows TCP/IP stack (used since at least 2000 and XP) was originally derived from BSD code in a similar fashion, using part of its TCP/IP code for its implementation of TCP/IP, which was legal.

Components derived from Android code include the Stagefright multimedia framework, as well as components of the graphics stack including the display server (derived from SurfaceFlinger) and the graphics driver (which seems to be derived from Nvidia's proprietary Linux driver).

Although a full web browser intended for general browsing is not available on the console unlike its predecessors, several so-called 'applets' are included which utilise the WebKit rendering engine to display web content within a stripped back interface. A WebKit-powered applet is used to allow users to log in to captive portals when connecting to certain wireless networks, as well as for operating system features such as the Nintendo eShop, social media integrations, and digital manuals.

=== Features ===
==== IPv6 support ====
The version of the Nintendo Switch system software that runs on the Nintendo Switch does not have IPv6 support, whereas the version that runs on the Nintendo Switch 2 does.

== User interface ==
=== Home screen ===
The Nintendo Switch home screen has battery, Internet and time information in the top-right corner, and below it is a grid showing all software on the system, downloaded or physical. Underneath that it has shortcuts to OS functions such as Nintendo Switch Online, GameChat (on Nintendo Switch 2), the News, eShop, Album, GameShare, Controller settings, Virtual Game Cards, System Settings, and a Sleep Mode button.

=== News ===
The News function of the Nintendo Switch software allows users to read gaming news and advertisements provided by Nintendo and third-party developers. News is also displayed when the system is locked.

The News interface was originally available in the 1.0.0 version of the software; however, new headlines were not transmitted until the 2.0.0 update was released. The 3.0.0 update revamped the News system, adding multiple news "channels" for different games that users can subscribe to. The news headlines that appear depend on which channels are subscribed to. The 4.0.0 update further improved the News screen, updating its layout. The 9.0.0 update added search support to the News channel, allowing users to narrow the list via filters or free text. The 10.0.0 update added a "Bookmark" feature, allowing users to save their favorite News articles.

=== GameChat (Nintendo Switch 2) ===
GameChat is a voice chat feature exclusive to the Nintendo Switch 2, similar to Discord and Skype. GameChat enables voice and video chat for online multiplayer sessions, with the ability to use GameShare with users in the chat room. Up to 12 people can participate in a single chat room, and up to 4 people can use screen sharing at the same time.

=== Nintendo eShop ===
The Nintendo eShop option on the Home menu opens an interface that allows games to be purchased and downloaded from the eShop. Though initially launched as a WebKit-based browser application applet, a major backend redesign switched the storefront into a native application, bringing it in line with the Nintendo Switch Online application. The update was published in June 2026 and sported major performance improvements, dark theme support (if configured from the system settings), the ability to set a passcode to prevent unauthorized purchases and new video player shortcuts.

As well as games, the eShop offers select non-gaming apps. Niconico, a popular Japanese video service, launched for the Switch in Japan on July 13, 2017, and was the Switch's first third-party media app in any market. Hulu was the first video streaming application released for the Switch in the United States on November 8, 2017. The Hulu app for the Nintendo Switch was shut down on February 5, 2026. In June 2018, Fils-Aimé said that conversations to bring Netflix to the Switch were "on-going". A YouTube application was released by Google on November 8, 2018. On November 4, 2020, a trial version app of the Tencent Video streaming service was launched exclusively for Nintendo Switch consoles officially distributed by Tencent in mainland China. An official version app was never released as the Chinese Switch eShop was shut down on March 31, 2026. Funimation launched their own streaming app for the Nintendo Switch, featuring a reworked layout and new functions. The app became available via eShop in the United States and Canada on December 15, 2020, and was announced to launch in various other countries at a later date, such as the United Kingdom and Ireland on March 22, 2021. A version of the Twitch app launched for the Nintendo Switch on November 11, 2021, in most regions worldwide. The eShop version of the app allows users to watch or follow any live or recorded content on Twitch, but does not support any native ability for Switch players to contribute content. The Twitch app for the Nintendo Switch was discontinued on January 31, 2024, and was often criticized for its use of the Applet system, which gave the Twitch app reduced RAM allocations.

Korg Gadget, a music production app, was released for the Nintendo Switch on April 26, 2018. InkyPen, a comics and manga subscription app, launched exclusively on the Switch worldwide in December 2018. Izneo, another comics and manga subscription service, was released for the Switch in February 2019. FUZE4, a text-based programming language app, was released in August 2019.

=== Album ===
The Album stores captured screenshots and videos. Pressing the "Capture" button on the controller, in supported software, will save a screenshot, either to the microSD card, or to the system memory. The Album allows users to view screenshots that have been taken. Screenshots can be edited by adding text, and they can be shared to Facebook or Twitter. In addition, in supported games, holding down the Capture button briefly will save the last 30 seconds of video to the Album. It can then be trimmed and posted online.

The 2.0.0 update added the ability to post screenshots to Facebook or Twitter from within the system UI, making it easier to share screenshots. The 4.0.0 update added support for saving 30-second videos, in compatible games. The 14.0.0 update added the ability to download screenshots and videos to a PC via a USB cable or to a Mobile device via a webpage hosting the files generated by the Switch.

Regardless of the amount of free space on the system's internal memory or microSD card, there is a hard limit on the number of screenshots and videos that can be stored, being 1,000 and 100 on the internal memory, and 10,000 and 1,000 on the microSD card, respectively.

On May 9, 2024, it was announced that, as of June 10, 2024, it would no longer be possible to post screenshots and videos on Twitter due to API changes.

=== GameShare ===
GameShare is a feature similar to DS Download Play, where users can play multiplayer games using a single copy of the game. While the feature was introduced to the Nintendo Switch in the 20.0.0 update, GameShare requires a Nintendo Switch 2 system in order to share a copy of the game. The feature also works online on the Nintendo Switch 2 via the GameChat service.

=== Controllers ===
The Controllers menu allows controllers to be paired, disconnected, or reconnected. The 3.0.0 update added the "Find Controllers" option, which allows any nearby controllers that have been paired to be remotely turned on and vibrated, to help find lost controllers.

=== Virtual Game Cards ===
Introduced in version 20.0.0, the Virtual Game Cards menu allows the user to manage digital games purchased in the Nintendo eShop similar to physical game cards, allowing the user to load, move, and lend them to another system tied to the users' Nintendo Account or Nintendo Account Family Group.

=== Settings ===
The Settings option allows for system settings to be changed, and includes other functionality, such as creating Miis.

=== Recovery Mode ===
The Nintendo Switch has a hidden Recovery Mode (RCM) feature, which can be accessed by powering off the unit, then using a specially constructed jig to short-circuit two pins on the right-hand Joy-Con connector, and then holding down the volume up button while powering on the unit. The unit would then boot without the Nintendo logo, indicating that Recovery Mode has been successfully activated. The feature is also used as an exploit on unpatched version 1.0.0 units to run homebrew software, which has been investigated for the purpose of digital forensics acquisition.

== History of updates ==
The initial version of the system software for Nintendo Switch on the launch day consoles was updated as a "day one" patch on March 3, 2017, the console's launch date. The update added online features that were previously missing from the original software before its official launch date. Some notable features of this update are access to the Nintendo eShop as well as the ability to add friends to a friends list, similar to that of the Nintendo 3DS. On June 7, 2021, patch 12.0.3 was released, but was removed 12 hours later for problems with network connections as well as issues with MicroSDXC cards.

The April 2021 firmware update was found by dataminers to have added rudimentary support for Bluetooth audio. This support was expanded and made available to regular users on September 14, 2021, when patch 13.0 was released. Patch 13.0 also added the ability to apply software updates to the Switch Dock (only applicable for docks released with the Switch OLED Model, which have a built-in LAN port), and a new setting for Sleep Mode that allows the Switch to maintain an Internet connection when the Switch is asleep to download updates. When disabled, the console will only connect to the Internet occasionally when asleep, in order to save power. Additionally, Patch 13.0 changed the method to initiate a control stick calibration and allowed users to view their wireless Internet frequency band (2.4 GHz or 5 GHz) on the Internet Connection Status page.

In November 2021, the 13.1.0 version update added support for Nintendo Switch Online + Expansion Pack.

The 14.0.0 update, released on March 21, 2022, added a Groups feature, allowing users to sort games into groups as a means to declutter the game collection screen.

The 20.0.0 update, released on April 30, 2025, added GameShare and Virtual Game Cards, as well as updated icon colours to match the Switch 2's user interface. Only Nintendo Switch 2 systems can initiate GameShare sessions, while all Nintendo Switch console generations may join them. The Chinese Nintendo Switch did not receive this update and is locked to firmware version 19.0.2.

== Notes ==
Only has partial System Menu support. Switch 2 exclusive languages.
