= Nintendo DSi system software =

Handheld game console operating system

- Screenshot of the Nintendo DSi's Home Menu. The top display shows photos taken using Nintendo DSi Camera, the bottom display shows apps and games on the system as selectable icons.
- Developer: Nintendo; Nintendo SDD
- OS family: Nintendo proprietary
- Working state: Discontinued
- Source model: Closed source
- Initial release: 1.0 / November 1, 2008; 17 years ago
- Latest release: 1.4.5 / December 11, 2012; 13 years ago
- Available in: Chinese (Simplified); English (United Kingdom); English (United States); French (Canada); French (France); German; Italian; Japanese; Korean; Spanish (Latin America); Spanish (Spain)
- Update method: Direct download
- Supported platforms: Nintendo DSi (XL)
- Preceded by: Nintendo DS firmware
- Succeeded by: Nintendo 3DS system software
- Official website: https://en-americas-support.nintendo.com/app/answers/detail/a_id/4514

Support status
- Unsupported

The Nintendo DSi system software is a discontinued set of updatable firmware versions and operating system for the Nintendo DSi handheld video game console (and its XL variant). Updates, which are downloaded via the system's Internet connection, allow Nintendo to add and remove features and software.

== Technology ==
=== User interface ===
The user interface of the Nintendo DSi has been redesigned from the Nintendo DS and Nintendo DS Lite. The DSi's user interface is a single row of icons which can be navigated by sliding the stylus across them. From the home menu, the user can take a picture at any time by pressing the shoulder (L/R) buttons. The picture is then displayed on the home menu's top screen. While the system is on, the power button acts as a soft reset button that returns the user to the home menu.

The Nintendo DSi provides built-in applications, including DSi Camera, DSi Sound, DSi Shop, PictoChat, and Download Play, and new programs can be downloaded and added to the interface via DSi Shop. The DSi Camera application allows for taking images and applying various filters. Facebook integration was added to the Nintendo DSi Camera application in July 2009, allowing users to share images taken with the camera.The DSi Sound application is thematically similar to DSi Camera, serving as a sound recorder and editor (along with a low bitrate AAC music player). Features include themed equalizers and modulators that modify a user's voice to sound similar to a robot or parakeet (Toy Story 3 is the only DSi enhanced game to use the DSi's audio modulator engine). The DSi Shop would serve as the DS counterpart of the Wii Shop Channel.

=== Multimedia features ===
Unlike Nintendo's previous handheld consoles such as the Nintendo DS and Nintendo DS Lite, the Nintendo DSi has built in music playback support. The DSi Sound program is split into two modes: voice recording and music playback. The recording mode lets users record at most 18 clips of maximum 10 seconds length. Once they have recorded a clip, they can play around with it in various ways. For example, users can make the clip play backwards or forwards, isolate small sections using A-B repeat, and modify the speed and tone by dragging a pointer around on a 2D graph. They can also apply 12 effects to the clip, which can be used to transform the sound. The music playback mode also has many play options. Once a song has been loaded up, users can change the speed and tone just like with the recording mode. They can also overlay the recordings that has been made in the recording mode to songs at any point. In addition, Nintendo has provided a set of sound effects which can be selected quickly by using the stylus, then inserted freely using shoulder buttons.

Unlike the built-in DSi Camera application, which cannot read any files that were not generated by the DSi itself, the DSi Sound application can read files from an SD card in various formats, including the AAC format, .mp4, .m4a, or .3GP filename extensions. The MP3 format is not supported. IGN criticized this restriction, further writing that compared with Sony's PlayStation Portable it is more difficult to interface the DSi with a PC, as there is no USB port on the system. In order to transfer music and podcasts over, users will need to remove the SD card and plug it directly into their PC.

=== Internet features ===
One of the major updates the Nintendo DSi brings to the Nintendo DS line is full network connectivity. Unlike the original Nintendo DS and Nintendo DS Lite which only featured minimal network connectivity, download content and firmware updates are at the core of the DSi experience, similar to the Wii and Sony's PlayStation Portable consoles. For example, when users first power up the system and click on the DSi Shop icon from the main menu, they are immediately prompted to run a firmware update. The Nintendo DSi supports WEP, WPA (AES/TKIP), and WPA2 (AES/TKIP) wireless encryption; only software with built-in support can use the latter two encryption types, as they were not supported by the DS and DS Lite.

The Nintendo DSi Shop application was released with the 1.1 system update. With the DSi Shop, users can purchase various DSiWare titles. The catchy music and blocky interface are somewhat similar to the counterpart on the Wii. Users can permanently login with their Club Nintendo account to track purchase rewards, and the main shopping interface also lets users add DSi Points and read the DSi shop manual.

The Nintendo DSi includes a web browser, which is a version of the Opera browser. It has support for the HTML5 canvas object and CSS opacity. However, there are limitations for these features. IGN criticized the browser for its difficulty rendering pages, slow download speeds, and incompatibility with movie files, music files or Adobe Flash on multimedia sites. Nintendo Life rated the browser 7/10 points, calling it "well worth having" despite its limitations, and improved from the Nintendo DS incarnation.

=== DSiWare and backward compatibility ===
The Nintendo DSi supports a collection of unique games and applications available for download via the DSi Shop, known as DSiWare, which are not compatible with the original Nintendo DS or Nintendo DS Lite consoles. The Nintendo DSi is Nintendo's first region-locked handheld; it prevents using certain software released for another region, unlike original Nintendo DS models. But as a member of the Nintendo DS line, the Nintendo DSi is backward compatible with most original Nintendo DS games, and cartridge software compatible with previous models including original DS games, Internet browsing, and photo sharing are not region-locked. Later, its successor, the Nintendo 3DS consoles also adopted this approach, and as a result all Nintendo DSi and 3DS-specific games are locked to a certain region, while original DS games are still region-free. In addition to DSiWare, which are DSi-exclusive (although later they can also run on a 3DS), there are also "DSi-enhanced" games containing DSi-exclusive features, but can still be played with earlier Nintendo DS models. While most original DS games can run on the DSi, the DSi is not backward compatible with Game Boy Advance (GBA) games or original DS games that require a GBA slot, since the DSi itself lacks of such a slot, unlike the DS and DS Lite. Because of this absence, the DSi is also not backward compatible with accessories requiring the GBA slot, such as the Nintendo DS Rumble Pak. Homebrew flash cartridges designed for previous DS models are incompatible with the DSi, but new cards capable of running DS software (or even DSiWare) on a DSi were available. While users cannot transfer purchased DSiWare on Nintendo DSi consoles between units, most DSiWare can be transferred to a Nintendo 3DS, although not saved data. Like the Nintendo DSi, the Nintendo 3DS is backward compatible with most Nintendo DS and Nintendo DSi software.

== Sources ==
- Nintendo (2009). Nintendo DSi Instruction Manual (PDF). Nintendo Australia. Archived from the original (PDF) on July 6, 2011.
