= Mini Mario & Friends: Amiibo Challenge =

2016 video game

- Developer: Nintendo Software Technology
- Publisher: Nintendo
- Director: Stephen Mortimer
- Producers: Akiya Sakamoto; Kensuke Tanabe
- Designers: Chris Polney; Jessica Zamora; Paul Kranich; Philip Brodsky
- Composer: James Phillipsen
- Series: Mario vs. Donkey Kong
- Platforms: Wii U, Nintendo 3DS
- Release: JP: January 28, 2016; WW: April 28, 2016
- Genre: Puzzle-platform
- Mode: Single-player

Mini Mario & Friends: Amiibo Challenge is a 2016 puzzle-platform game developed and published by Nintendo for the Nintendo 3DS and Wii U. The seventh entry in the Mario vs. Donkey Kong series, the game was free to download on the Nintendo eShop, but requires Nintendo's Amiibo lineup in order to play. It was released in Japan in January 2016 and worldwide in April.

The game received mixed reviews from critics, with its new additions and use of Amiibo earning approval but criticism towards its length and high unoriginality.

== Gameplay ==
The title's main gameplay is based on the Mario vs. Donkey Kong series. There is only a single-player mode. Players use a stylus to manipulate the level layout, allowing miniature Mario series characters to survive or achieve goals. Objects such as girders or trampolines can be moved, allowing characters to travel along their intended path. Example characters include Mario, Diddy Kong, Luigi, Rosalina, Toad, Bowser, Princess Peach, Bowser Jr., Donkey Kong, and Yoshi, all sporting a unique power. Obstacles are included such as mine carts and ghost Boos.

=== Amiibo requirement ===
There are eleven mini playable characters. The game requires Nintendo's Amiibo figurine lineup in order to play, and Amiibo of certain Mario series characters unlock miniature versions of those characters with special abilities. Only Amiibo figurines can be used to play the game, not Amiibo cards. Amiibo figurines produced by a third-party company also work. If the player has a non-Mario series Amiibo figurinee, the game will put in Mini Spek instead of the Amiibo figurine the player puts on the Wii U GamePad, and the NFC Reader/Writer connected to Nintendo 3DS, Nintendo 3DS XL or Nintendo 2DS, or the New Nintendo 3DS, New Nintendo 3DS XL or New Nintendo 2DS XL. The Mini Spek is a character that resembles a blue wind-up block that has no special abilities. Mini Spek can't access Amiibo doors, but can undergo a basic set of levels.

Characters from the Mario canon work, and when unlocked in the game, unlocks a mini version of the Amiibo and its special move. Examples include six Yoshi figurines, from both Super Smash Bros. and Yoshi's Woolly World. The six available Mario figurines result in a Mini Mario character with wall jump as a special ability. With two figurines that work, Mini Luigi has high jump as an ability, and Mini Peach from two figurines has floating jump. There are two figurines for Mini Bowser, who has the special ability Bowser Bomb. Mini Rosalina, Mini Donkey Kong and Mini Diddy Kong can also be unlocked with their respective Super Smash Bros. and Super Mario Amiibo figurines. There are only single Amiibo figurines to unlock Mini Toad and Mini Bowser Jr.

=== Stages ===
There are over 50 levels total. The map has several secret unlockable levels, as well as additional fringe zones for each supported character. In addition to the main missions, there are also character-themed worlds with four stages each, such as Luigi's Mansion and Bowser's Castle.

With the basic character, there are 12 stages in total. With a Mario-themed character, more stages unlock, and 10 of the 12 core stages have an alternate exit that in turn have four special stages for that specific character. There are also two collectible 'amiibo cards' that only specific characters can reach. This means that for a player to achieve 100% completion, they need an amiibo for 10 Mario universe characters, and need to play each core level three times.

== Development ==
Stephen Mortimer directed the game, and was produced by Akiya Sakamoto and Kensuke Tanabe with music by James Phillipsen. It was released with Amiibo purchase on March 25, 2016, with a wide release on April 28.

== Reception ==
Reception

Review scores
Publication	Score
Destructoid	6/10
Nintendo Life	7/10

Destructoid did not like the game a lot because it was similar to previous installments in the series and had little gameplay, saying it could be completed in an afternoon and basically amounted to a demo in size, but they did say the game was better than other Amiibo games like Amiibo Tap: Nintendo's Greatest Bits. Nintendo Life liked it quite a bit and also said it was better than Amiibo Tap, and gave it 7 of 10 stars. The review said the levels were decent as well, especially considering the game was free. They especially liked the extra levels unlocked by using themed figurines. The Financial Post thought the series was becoming simple and predictable, but said the game was a nice "gift" and worth the time for people who already had Amiibo collections.
