= N3DS =

N3DS may refer to:

- Nintendo 3DS, the first system in the Nintendo 3DS family of handheld consoles
- New Nintendo 3DS, the fourth system in the Nintendo 3DS family of handheld consoles
- Nintendo 3DS line, the entire 3DS series
