= Amiibo =

Toy control platform by Nintendo

- International standard: Near field communication
- Developed by: Nintendo
- Introduced: NA: November 21, 2014; EU: November 28, 2014; AU: November 29, 2014; JP: December 6, 2014
- Industry: Video games
- Connector type: Wireless
- Compatible hardware: Wii U; Nintendo 3DS; Nintendo Switch; Nintendo Switch 2
- 4–10 centimetres (1.6–3.9 in)
- Website: www.nintendo.com/amiibo

Amiibo (Note: Japanese: アミーボ, Hepburn: Amībo) (/əˈmiːboʊ/, ə-MEE-boh; plural: Amiibo, stylized as amiibo) is a toys-to-life platform by Nintendo, which was released in North America, Europe, and Australia in November 2014, followed by Japan a month later. It consists of a wireless communications and storage protocol for connecting figurines to the Wii U, Nintendo 3DS, Nintendo Switch and Nintendo Switch 2 video game consoles. These figurines are similar in form and functionality to that of the Skylanders, Disney Infinity and Lego Dimensions series of toys-to-life platforms. The Amiibo platform was preannounced to potentially accommodate any form of toy, specifically including general plans for future card games. Amiibo use near field communication (NFC) to interact with supported video game software, potentially allowing data to be transferred in and out of games and across multiple platforms.

Amiibo functionality can be used directly with the Nintendo Switch, Nintendo Switch 2, Wii U, and New Nintendo 3DS consoles by using built-in NFC readers. In addition, the rest of the 3DS hardware line can use an official NFC adapter. By September 2016, Nintendo reported that 39 million Amiibo figures had been sold, along with more than 30 million Amiibo cards. By September 2022, total sales reached 77 million toys.

== History ==
=== Development ===
Several Amiibo figurines

They came up with the name in Japan, and the ‘amii’ portion comes from a little something in French that conveys the sentiment of friend, of playing with your friend. That’s what they’re really trying to convey with it. I think for us it sounds a little like amigo. That’s not the origin of the name, but it conveys the intent.

— Bill Trinen, translator at Nintendo

Toys for Bob and its parent company Activision had offered an opportunity for Nintendo to be a partner in a new video game franchise known as Skylanders, which would use RFID-equipped character figurines and a special reader component to interact with the game itself, and could store data on the figurine itself such as the corresponding character's statistics. While Nintendo passed on the exclusivity deal, the franchise itself quickly became one of Activision's most successful franchises upon its launch as a spin-off of the Spyro the Dragon series, and also resulted in competition from Disney Interactive Studios, who released a game with a similar concept known as Disney Infinity in 2013.

In March 2013, Nintendo unveiled Pokémon Rumble U, the first game for the Wii U to use the Wii U GamePad's near-field communications support to enable the use of its own interactive figurines. During an investors' meeting in May 2014, Nintendo presented a prototype of a more comprehensive figurine platform for its 3DS and Wii U consoles, which was designed so that the figurines could be used across multiple games. The new system was codenamed NFP, standing for either "Nintendo Figurine Platform" or "NFC Featured Platform", and was slated to be officially unveiled during E3.

On June 10, 2014, during E3 2014, Nintendo officially announced the Amiibo platform, and that Super Smash Bros. for Wii U would be among the first games to provide features integrating with Amiibo figurines.

In a corporate policy event after the launch of the Amiibo platform, Nintendo executive Shigeru Miyamoto addressed the platform's future by stating that the company was "now moving forward with projects that make use of NFC in a variety of unique ways. Nintendo is known as a video game company, but in fact, it is also a toy company."

=== Release ===
Super Smash Bros. Amiibo toys were first released in North America on November 21, 2014, in Europe on November 28, 2014, and in Japan on December 6, 2014, along with the release of Super Smash Bros. for Wii U.

The Super Mario series, featuring Mario, Luigi, Peach, Yoshi, Bowser, and Toad, arrived on March 20, 2015, for both regions.

In 2015, Nintendo began to extend the Amiibo line into new form factors; on February 27, 2015, Nintendo CEO Satoru Iwata revealed that the company had plans to release Amiibo-enabled trading cards. On April 1, 2015, Nintendo unveiled Animal Crossing: Happy Home Designer, a spin-off in the Animal Crossing series that utilizes cards. Nintendo also unveiled Amiibo yarn plushies as a tie-in for Yoshi's Woolly World.

During the E3 2015 Nintendo Direct on June 16, 2015, Activision revealed Bowser and Donkey Kong Amiibo (Hammer Slam Bowser and Turbo Charge Donkey Kong) and vehicles for use in Skylanders: SuperChargers. These toys are compatible with either the Skylanders games or Amiibo-compatible games by means of a mode switch on their bases. They will work across all Nintendo platform versions of Skylanders: SuperChargers. The Amiibo are also compatible with all Nintendo platform versions of Skylanders: Imaginators.

On August 27, 2015, an Amiibo toy of the titular character from the indie video game Shovel Knight was unveiled, which unlocks content exclusive to the 3DS and Wii U versions of the game and its future installments. It is the first Amiibo toy of a non-Nintendo character that is not associated with a first-party title; previous Amiibo toys of third-party characters were associated with Super Smash Bros. Additionally, production and distribution of the figurine was overseen by the game's publisher, Yacht Club Games, rather than Nintendo (except in Japan where the latter is the publisher), although it is still officially marketed by Nintendo as part of the Amiibo line as a form of brand licensing. Explaining the arrangement, a Nintendo representative stated that "we were like, what's one thing that Nintendo could do that nobody [else] could ever do?"

The Amiibo line for The Legend of Zelda initially began solely with the Wolf Link figurine, which is mainly used in The Legend of Zelda: Twilight Princess HD and later Breath of the Wild. It expanded with the 30th Anniversary collection (8-bit Link, Ocarina of Time Link, The Wind Waker Link, and The Wind Waker Zelda), and the Breath of the Wild collection (Archer Link, Rider Link, Zelda, Bokoblin, Mipha, Daruk, Revali, Urbosa and the Guardian figurine). At E3 2017, Nintendo unveiled several new Amiibo figurines, including wedding-themed Mario, Peach and Bowser figurines which coincided with the launch of the Nintendo Switch game Super Mario Odyssey, as well as figurines of Chrom and Tiki from the Fire Emblem series to tie in with the release of Fire Emblem Warriors on Switch and New 3DS systems. Two Metroid-themed Amiibo figures released alongside the 3DS remake of Metroid II, Metroid: Samus Returns, and figurines released later based around the four Champions in The Legend of Zelda: Breath of the Wild. Third-party software developer Bethesda Softworks announced that existing Zelda figurines would be compatible with the Nintendo Switch port of The Elder Scrolls V: Skyrim, allowing players to obtain select Zelda items and clothing for their Dragonborn, including the Master Sword, Hylian Shield and the Champion's Tunic from Breath of the Wild.

== Collectibility and supply issues ==
Life-to-date number of Amiibo shipped, millions
Amiibo	FY	Q1	Q2	Q3	Q4	Year	Total
Figures	2014–15	—N/a	—N/a	5.7	4.8	10.5	39.0
Figures	2015–16	4.2	6.4	9.9	4.2	24.7	39.0
Figures	2016–17	1.7	2.1	3.8	-	6.5	39.0
Cards	2015–16	—N/a	8.6	12.9	7.4	28.9	30.6
Cards	2016–17	1.3	0.4	-	-	1.7	30.6

Upon initial launch, the Amiibo line quickly spiked in popularity, with preorders selling out before the products became available to the public. While Nintendo CEO Satoru Iwata stated that Amiibo will be kept in stock, he also explained that some will be "limited-time offers which will cede their positions to new ones once they are sold out". The rarity of certain Amiibo figurines influenced the prices held by online retailers and auctions, of which most can be seen offering select items at prices above the retail price. In Nintendo's 3rd Quarter Financial Results Briefing for the Fiscal Year Ending March 2015, Satoru Iwata expressed surprise at such online auctions that offered "premium prices" of sold out Amiibo toys. A number of first-wave Amiibo toys with manufacturing defects were discovered and sold for notably high prices, such as a Samus figurine with cannons on both arms instead of one arm being sold on eBay for US$2,500, and a defect of Princess Peach with missing legs being sold for US$25,100.

On April 2, 2015, when preorders were being taken for the May 29 release of the Super Smash Bros. series Wave 4 and the Splatoon series, the US preorder process crashed both GameStop's website and in-store register system. Nintendo acknowledged these issues in early May 2015. Amazon forwent the entire preorder process for those waves; it instead blocked out specific time intervals on their release date during which the non-retailer exclusive Amiibo and the Super Mario series Silver Mario Amiibo were available. The retailer continued this practice with its exclusive release of the Palutena Amiibo as well as those released on September 11, 2015.

In May 2015 in the UK, a truck was stolen that contained preorders of the special edition of Splatoon, which included a rare Inkling Squid Amiibo as a preorder bonus: the only way to obtain the figure in the UK. As a result, Nintendo lacked the stock to supply the Inkling Squid Amiibo to those who preordered, and offered Inkling Girl or Inkling Boy Amiibo instead alongside a standard edition with a £10 refund, or full refunds.

In response to the lack of certain Amiibo toys in the United States, Satoru Iwata explained on February 17, 2015, that "an ongoing labor dispute on the west coast" has delayed the "discharge of cargo over the past six months", and was the cause of the absences of certain Amiibo toys intended to be delivered before its launch in November. Following this announcement, rarer Amiibo toys such as Wii Fit Trainer, Meta Knight, and Ike have been receiving limited re-releases in North America. For the US, the exclusive Best Buy release of the Dark Pit figurine, the retailer announced it would not take any preorders or online orders and the item would be limited to one per customer. While some news sources such as Kotaku came out in favour of Best Buy's practice, alternatively in response to this (and the difficulty of acquiring previous retailer-exclusives), others, such as Brian Altano, Jose Otero, and Peer Schneider of IGN's Nintendo Voice Chat podcast, have encouraged American collectors to import these hard-to-find items.

== Hardware support ==
The Wii U, New Nintendo 3DS/3DS XL and 2DS XL, and Nintendo Switch and Switch 2 contain integrated NFC support, allowing their use with Amiibo. On Wii U, toys are scanned using an NFC reader contained within the Wii U GamePad. Amiibo support was formally introduced to the consoles' firmware between November and December 2014; these updates added an Amiibo menu to the system settings area, allowing users to scan, register, and erase data from toys. The Nintendo Switch similarly features an NFC reader in both the Joy-Con R and Pro Controller.

A separate NFC reader accessory for the original Nintendo 3DS, 3DS XL, and 2DS was released in 2015 alongside Animal Crossing: Happy Home Designer.

== Amiibo data communication ==
Supported games offer one of two kinds of Amiibo compatibility; the ability to access an Amiibo toy's NFC tag and store data, and read-only recognition. Each Amiibo toy largely corresponds to a specific game that can access its storage space, though some may have multiple games that can use it. However, each Amiibo toy can only store data from one compatible game at a time, meaning data must be deleted to use it with a different title. For example, a Mario Amiibo figurine containing data from Super Smash Bros. for Nintendo 3DS and Wii U must have the data for that game deleted to store data from Mario Party 10. Many games offer compatibility with specific Amiibo toys on a read-only basis, allowing for additional content to be unlocked in that game. For example, using certain figurines with Mario Kart 8 or Mario Kart 8 Deluxe unlocks Mii costumes based on the corresponding character. Multiple variations of the same character offer the same compatibility, although special variations can unlock unique content with specific games. Existing Wii U and 3DS games can receive updates for Amiibo functionality. Due to their co-development effort on Super Smash Bros. for Nintendo 3DS and Wii U, Bandai Namco Entertainment were the first third-party publishers to embrace the Amiibo concept in some of their own games.

== List of Amiibo ==
The following list features all known NFC items branded under Amiibo, originally produced in the form of character figurines as of 2014, then cards as of 2015, and other types in the future. Nintendo designed all Amiibo characters to be cross-compatible with all games that support specific Amiibo characters, regardless of whichever model line these characters belong to; for example, Mario figurines from both the Super Smash Bros. and Super Mario series have the same functionality. Yoshi's line are soft dolls instead of hard plastic figurines.

There are currently Amiibo figurines, 3 Amiibo card series, and 21 noted variants on this list.

Amiibo platform compatibility
Character	Amiibo series	Super Smash Bros. for Nintendo 3DS and Wii U	Mario Kart 8 / Mario Kart 8 Deluxe	Super Mario Maker	One Piece: Super Grand Battle! X	Ace Combat: Assault Horizon Legacy +	Picross 3D: Round 2	Animal Crossing: New Leaf / Animal Crossing: New Leaf - Welcome Amiibo	Conga Master Party!	Super Smash Bros. Ultimate
Blathers	Animal Crossing	No	Read Only (Deluxe)	Read Only	No	No	No	Read Only	Read Only	Read Only
Celeste	Animal Crossing	No	Read Only (Deluxe)	Read Only	No	No	No	Read Only	Read Only	Read Only
Cyrus	Animal Crossing	No	Read Only (Deluxe)	Read Only	No	No	No	Read Only	Read Only	Read Only
Digby	Animal Crossing	No	Read Only (Deluxe)	Read Only	No	No	No	Read Only	Read Only	Read Only
Isabelle (Summer Outfit)	Animal Crossing	No	Read Only (Deluxe)	Read Only	No	No	No	Read Only	Read Only	Yes
Isabelle (Winter Outfit)	Animal Crossing	No	Read Only (Deluxe)	Read Only	No	No	No	Read Only	Read Only	Yes
K.K. (also known as K.K. Slider)	Animal Crossing	No	Read Only (Deluxe)	Read Only	No	No	No	Read Only	Read Only	Read Only
Kapp'n	Animal Crossing	No	Read Only (Deluxe)	Read Only	No	No	No	Read Only	Read Only	Read Only
Kicks	Animal Crossing	No	Read Only (Deluxe)	Read Only	No	No	No	Read Only	Read Only	Read Only
Lottie	Animal Crossing	No	Read Only (Deluxe)	Read Only	No	No	No	Read Only	Read Only	Read Only
Mabel	Animal Crossing	No	Read Only (Deluxe)	Read Only	No	No	No	Read Only	Read Only	Read Only
Reese	Animal Crossing	No	Read Only (Deluxe)	Read Only	No	No	No	Read Only	Read Only	Read Only
Resetti(also known as Mr. Resetti)	Animal Crossing	No	Read Only (Deluxe)	Read Only	No	No	No	Read Only	Read Only	Read Only
Rover	Animal Crossing	No	Read Only (Deluxe)	Read Only	No	No	No	Read Only	Read Only	Read Only
Timmy & Tommy	Animal Crossing	No	Read Only (Deluxe)	Read Only	No	No	No	Read Only	Read Only	Read Only
Tom Nook	Animal Crossing	No	Read Only (Deluxe)	Read Only	No	No	No	Read Only	Read Only	Read Only
Animal Crossing Amiibo cards	Animal Crossing (Series 1, 2, 3, 4, RV, Sanrio RV and other cards)	No	Read Only (Deluxe)	Read Only (Note: Not all cards are supported. Compatible cards are 001/113/215/301/403/424/CP Isabelle, 002/203/401/423 Tom Nook, 003 DJ KK, 005 Kapp'n, 006/309 Resetti, 009/213 Digby, 017/311/420 Lottie, 101/411/CP K.K., 102 Reese, 103/415 Kicks, 201 Rover, 202/406 Blathers, 207/408 Mabel, 210 Cyrus, 305/407 Celeste and 402 Timmy & Tommy.)	No	No	No	Read Only	Read Only	Yes (Note: Only 001/113/215/301/403/424/CP Isabelle are compatible.)
Qbby	BoxBoy!	No	No	No	No	No	No	No	No	Read Only
Chibi-Robo	Chibi-Robo!	No	No	Read Only	No	No	No	No	No	Read Only
Solaire of Astora	Dark Souls	No	No	No	No	No	No	No	No	No
Loot Goblin	Diablo	No	No	No	No	No	No	No	No	No
Donkey Kong and Pauline	Donkey Kong	Yes	Read Only	Read Only	No	Read Only	No	No	No	Yes
Alm	Fire Emblem	No	No	No	No	No	No	No	No	Read Only
Celica	Fire Emblem	No	No	No	No	No	No	No	No	Read Only
Chrom	Fire Emblem	No	No	No	No	No	No	No	No	Yes
Tiki	Fire Emblem	No	No	No	No	No	No	No	No	Read Only
King Dedede	Kirby	Yes	Read Only (Deluxe)	Read Only	No	No	Read Only	No	No	Yes
Kirby	Kirby	Yes	Read Only	Read Only	Read Only	No	Read Only	No	No	Yes
Meta Knight	Kirby	Yes	Read Only (Deluxe)	Read Only	No	No	Read Only	No	No	Yes
Waddle Dee	Kirby	No	Read Only (Deluxe)	No	No	No	No	No	No	Read Only
Bokoblin	The Legend of Zelda	No	Read Only (Deluxe)	No	No	No	No	No	Read Only	Read Only
Daruk	The Legend of Zelda	No	Read Only (Deluxe)	No	No	No	No	No	Read Only	Read Only
Ganondorf (Tears of the Kingdom)	The Legend of Zelda	Yes	Read Only (Deluxe)	Read Only	No	No	No	Read Only	Read Only	Yes
Guardian	The Legend of Zelda	No	Read Only (Deluxe)	No	No	No	No	No	Read Only	Read Only
Link (Archer)	The Legend of Zelda	Yes	Read Only	Read Only	Read Only	Read Only	Read Only	Read Only	Read Only	Yes
Link (Rider)	The Legend of Zelda	Yes	Read Only	Read Only	Read Only	Read Only	Read Only	Read Only	Read Only	Yes
Link (The Legend of Zelda)	The Legend of Zelda	Yes	Read Only	Read Only	Read Only	Read Only	Read Only	Read Only	Read Only	Yes
Link (Link's Awakening)	The Legend of Zelda	Yes	Read Only	Read Only	Read Only	Read Only	Read Only	Read Only	Read Only	Yes
Link (Majora's Mask) (Note: Recognized as Link in Super Smash Bros. for Nintendo 3DS and Wii U, and as Young Link in Super Smash Bros. Ultimate.)	The Legend of Zelda	Yes	Read Only	Read Only	Read Only	Read Only	Read Only	Read Only	Read Only	Yes
Link (Ocarina of Time)	The Legend of Zelda	Yes	Read Only	Read Only	Read Only	Read Only	Read Only	Read Only	Read Only	Yes
Link (Skyward Sword)	The Legend of Zelda	Yes	Read Only	Read Only	Read Only	Read Only	Read Only	Read Only	Read Only	Yes
Link (Twilight Princess)	The Legend of Zelda	Yes	Read Only	Read Only	Read Only	Read Only	Read Only	Read Only	Read Only	Yes
Link (Tears of the Kingdom)	The Legend of Zelda	Yes	Read Only	Read Only	Read Only	Read Only	Read Only	Read Only	Read Only	Yes
Mipha	The Legend of Zelda	No	Read Only (Deluxe)	No	No	No	No	No	Read Only	Read Only
Revali	The Legend of Zelda	No	Read Only (Deluxe)	No	No	No	No	No	Read Only	Read Only
Toon Link (The Wind Waker)	The Legend of Zelda	Yes	Read Only	Read Only	No	Read Only	Read Only	Read Only	Read Only	Yes
Mineru's Construct	The Legend of Zelda	No	No	No	No	No	No	No	No	No
Riju	The Legend of Zelda	No	No	No	No	No	No	No	No	No
Sidon	The Legend of Zelda	No	No	No	No	No	No	No	No	No
Tulin	The Legend of Zelda	No	No	No	No	No	No	No	No	No
Urbosa	The Legend of Zelda	No	Read Only (Deluxe)	No	No	No	No	No	Read Only	Read Only
Wolf Link	The Legend of Zelda	No	Read Only (Deluxe)	Read Only	No	No	No	Read Only	Read Only	Read Only
Yunobo	The Legend of Zelda	No	No	No	No	No	No	No	No	No
Zelda	The Legend of Zelda	Yes	Read Only (Deluxe)	Read Only	No	Read Only	No	Read Only	Read Only	Yes
Zelda & Loftwing	The Legend of Zelda	Yes	Read Only (Deluxe)	Read Only	No	Read Only	No	Read Only	Read Only	Yes
Zelda (The Wind Waker)	The Legend of Zelda	Yes	Read Only (Deluxe)	Read Only	No	Read Only	No	Read Only	Read Only	Yes
Zelda (Tears of the Kingdom)	The Legend of Zelda	Yes	Read Only (Deluxe)	Read Only	No	Read Only	No	Read Only	Read Only	Yes
Mario Sports Superstars Amiibo cards	Mario Sports Superstars	No	No	No	No	No	No	No	No	No
Mega Man	Mega Man	Yes	Read Only	Read Only	No	No	No	No	No	Yes
E.M.M.I.	Metroid	No	Read Only (Deluxe)	No	No	No	No	No	Read Only	Read Only
Metroid	Metroid	No	Read Only (Deluxe)	No	No	No	No	No	Read Only	Read Only
Samus	Metroid	Yes	Read Only	Read Only	Read Only	Read Only	No	No	Read Only	Yes
Samus	Metroid	Yes	Read Only	Read Only	Read Only	Read Only	No	No	Read Only	Yes
Barioth and Avinia	Monster Hunter Stories	No	No	No	No	No	No	Read Only	No	No
Ena	Monster Hunter Stories	No	No	No	No	No	No	No	No	No
Magnamalo	Monster Hunter Rise	No	No	No	No	No	No	No	No	No
Malzeno	Monster Hunter Rise	No	No	No	No	No	No	No	No	No
Navirou	Monster Hunter Stories	No	No	No	No	No	No	Read Only	No	No
One-Eyed Rathalos and Female Rider	Monster Hunter Stories	No	No	No	No	No	No	Read Only	No	No
One-Eyed Rathalos and Male Rider	Monster Hunter Stories	No	No	No	No	No	No	Read Only	No	No
Palamute	Monster Hunter Rise	No	No	No	No	No	No	No	No	No
Palamute (Canyne Malzeno)	Monster Hunter Rise	No	No	No	No	No	No	No	No	No
Palico	Monster Hunter Rise	No	No	No	No	No	No	No	No	No
Palico (Felyne Malzeno)	Monster Hunter Rise	No	No	No	No	No	No	No	No	No
Qurupeco and Dan	Monster Hunter Stories	No	No	No	No	No	No	Read Only	No	No
Rathian and Cheval	Monster Hunter Stories	No	No	No	No	No	No	Read Only	No	No
Razewing Ratha	Monster Hunter Stories	No	No	No	No	No	No	No	No	No
Tsukino	Monster Hunter Stories	No	No	No	No	No	No	No	No	No
Pikmin	Pikmin	No	Read Only (Deluxe)	Read Only	No	No	No	No	No	Read Only
Detective Pikachu	Pokémon	No	No	No	No	No	No	No	No	Read Only
Shadow Mewtwo (Note: This Amiibo card is exclusively available with first print copies of Pokkén Tournament.)	Pokkén Tournament	No	No	No	No	No	No	No	No	No
Diana	Pragmata	TBA	TBA	TBA	TBA	TBA	TBA	TBA	TBA	TBA
Grace Ashcroft	Resident Evil	TBA	TBA	TBA	TBA	TBA	TBA	TBA	TBA	TBA
Leon S. Kennedy	Resident Evil	TBA	TBA	TBA	TBA	TBA	TBA	TBA	TBA	TBA
King Knight	Shovel Knight	No	No	No	No	No	No	No	No	Read Only
Plague Knight	Shovel Knight	No	No	No	No	No	No	No	No	Read Only
Shovel Knight	Shovel Knight	No	No	No	No	No	No	No	No	Read Only
Shovel Knight (Gold Edition)	Shovel Knight	No	No	No	No	No	No	No	No	No
Specter Knight	Shovel Knight	No	No	No	No	No	No	No	No	Read Only
Hammer Slam Bowser (Note: These figurines feature an interchangeable base, allowing them to function as both Amiibo figurines and Skylanders figurines. Alternate Dark Edition color schemes are only available in Dark Edition Starter Packs.)	Skylanders	Yes	Read Only	Read Only	No	Read Only	Read Only	No	No	Yes
Turbo Charge Donkey Kong	Skylanders	Yes	Read Only	Read Only	No	Read Only	No	No	No	Yes
Big Man	Splatoon	No	Read-only (Deluxe)	No	No	No	No	No	Read Only	No
Callie	Splatoon	No	Read Only (Deluxe)	Read Only	No	No	No	Read Only	Read Only	Read Only
Callie (Alterna)	Splatoon	No	Read Only (Deluxe)	Read Only	No	No	No	Read Only	Read Only	No
Frye	Splatoon	No	Read Only (Deluxe)	No	No	No	No	No	Read Only	No
Inkling Boy	Splatoon	No	Read Only (Deluxe)	Read Only	No	No	No	Read Only	Read Only	Yes
Inkling Boy (Neon Green)	Splatoon	No	Read Only (Deluxe)	Read Only	No	No	No	Read Only	Read Only	Yes
Inkling Boy (Purple)	Splatoon	No	Read Only (Deluxe)	Read Only	No	No	No	Read Only	Read Only	Yes
Inkling Girl	Splatoon	No	Read Only (Deluxe)	Read Only	No	No	No	Read Only	Read Only	Yes
Inkling Girl (Green)	Splatoon	No	Read Only (Deluxe)	Read Only	No	No	No	Read Only	Read Only	Yes
Inkling Girl (Neon Pink)	Splatoon	No	Read Only (Deluxe)	Read Only	No	No	No	Read Only	Read Only	Yes
Inkling Squid	Splatoon	No	Read Only (Deluxe)	Read Only	No	No	No	Read Only	Read Only	Yes
Inkling Squid (Neon Purple)	Splatoon	No	Read Only (Deluxe)	Read Only	No	No	No	Read Only	Read Only	Yes
Inkling Squid (Orange)	Splatoon	No	Read Only (Deluxe)	Read Only	No	No	No	Read Only	Read Only	Yes
Inkling (Yellow)	Splatoon	No	Read Only (Deluxe)	Read Only	No	No	No	Read Only	Read Only	Yes
Marie	Splatoon	No	Read Only (Deluxe)	Read Only	No	No	No	Read Only	Read Only	Read Only
Marie (Alterna)	Splatoon	No	Read Only (Deluxe)	Read Only	No	No	No	Read Only	Read Only	No
Marina	Splatoon	No	Read Only (Deluxe)	No	No	No	No	No	Read Only	Read Only
Marina (Side Order)	Splatoon	No	Read Only (Deluxe)	No	No	No	No	No	Read Only	No
Octoling Boy	Splatoon	No	Read Only (Deluxe)	No	No	No	No	No	Read Only	Read Only
Octoling Girl	Splatoon	No	Read Only (Deluxe)	No	No	No	No	No	Read Only	Read Only
Octoling Octopus	Splatoon	No	Read Only (Deluxe)	No	No	No	No	No	Read Only	Read Only
Octoling (Blue)	Splatoon	No	Read Only (Deluxe)	No	No	No	No	No	Read Only	No
Pearl	Splatoon	No	Read Only (Deluxe)	No	No	No	No	No	Read Only	Read Only
Pearl (Side Order)	Splatoon	No	Read Only (Deluxe)	No	No	No	No	No	Read Only	No
Shiver	Splatoon	No	Read Only (Deluxe)	No	No	No	No	No	Read Only	No
Smallfry	Splatoon	No	Read Only (Deluxe)	No	No	No	No	No	Read Only	No
Jamie	Street Fighter 6	No	No	No	No	No	No	No	No	No
Kimberly	Street Fighter 6	No	No	No	No	No	No	No	No	No
Luke	Street Fighter 6	No	No	No	No	No	No	No	No	No
Street Fighter 6 Cards	Street Fighter 6	No	No	No	No	No	No	No	No	Yes (Note: Not all cards are supported. Compatible cards are 011/041 Ryu, 015/045 Ken, and 024/054 Terry.)
Boo	Super Mario	No	No	No	No	No	No	No	Read Only	Read Only
Bowser	Super Mario	Yes	Read Only	Read Only	No	Read Only	Read Only	No	Read Only	Yes
Bowser (Wedding Outfit)	Super Mario	Yes	Read Only	Read Only	No	Read Only	Read Only	No	Read Only	Yes
Captain Toad & Talking Flower	Super Mario	TBA	TBA	TBA	TBA	TBA	TBA	TBA	TBA	TBA
Cat Mario	Super Mario	Yes	Read Only	Read Only	No	Read Only	Read Only	No	Read Only	Yes
Cat Peach	Super Mario	Yes	Read Only	Read Only	No	Read Only	Read Only	No	Read Only	Yes
Daisy	Super Mario	No	Read Only (Deluxe)	No	No	No	No	No	Read Only	Yes
Diddy Kong	Super Mario	Yes	No	Read Only	No	No	No	No	Read Only	Yes
Donkey Kong	Super Mario	Yes	Read Only	Read Only	Read Only	Read Only	No	No	Read Only	Yes
Elephant Mario	Super Mario	TBA	TBA	TBA	TBA	TBA	TBA	TBA	TBA	TBA
Goomba	Super Mario	No	No	Read Only	No	No	No	No	Read Only	Read Only
Koopa Troopa	Super Mario	No	No	No	No	No	No	No	Read Only	Read Only
Luigi	Super Mario	Yes	Read Only	Read Only	Read Only	Read Only	Read Only	No	Read Only	Yes
Mario (Note: Also produced in Gold (North America, Australia, and Japan) and Silver (North America and Australia).)	Super Mario	Yes	Read Only	Read Only	Read Only	Read Only	Read Only	No	Read Only	Yes
Mario (Wedding Outfit)	Super Mario	Yes	Read Only	Read Only	Read Only	Read Only	Read Only	No	Read Only	Yes
Peach	Super Mario	Yes	Read Only	Read Only	No	Read Only	Read Only	No	Read Only	Yes
Peach (Wedding Outfit)	Super Mario	Yes	Read Only	Read Only	No	Read Only	Read Only	No	Read Only	Yes
Poplin & Prince Florian	Super Mario	TBA	TBA	TBA	TBA	TBA	TBA	TBA	TBA	TBA
Rosalina	Super Mario	Yes	Read Only	Read Only	No	No	No	No	Read Only	Yes
Toad	Super Mario	No	Read Only	Read Only	No	No	Read Only	No	Read Only	Read Only
Waluigi	Super Mario	No	No	Read Only	No	No	No	No	Read Only	Read Only
Wario	Super Mario	Yes	Read Only	Read Only	No	No	No	No	Read Only	Yes
Yoshi	Super Mario	Yes	Read Only	Read Only	Read Only	No	Read Only	No	Read Only	Yes
8-Bit Mario (Note: Produced in classic and modern colors.)	Super Mario Bros. 30th Anniversary	Yes	Read Only	Read Only	Read Only	Read Only	Read Only	No	Read Only	Yes
Delicious Amiibo (Note: This Amiibo card is printed onto boxes of the Super Mario Cereal made as a tie-in promotion for Super Mario Odyssey.)	Super Mario Cereal	No	No	No	No	No	No	No	No	No
Power-Up Bands	Super Nintendo World	No	Read only (Deluxe) (Note: The Diddy Kong Power-Up Band is not supported.)	No	No	No	No	No	No	Yes (Note: The Toad Power-Up Band only has read support.)
Alex	Super Smash Bros.	No	No	No	No	No	No	No	No	Yes
Banjo & Kazooie	Super Smash Bros.	No	No	No	No	No	No	No	No	Yes
Bayonetta (Note: Also produced as a Player 2 variant with an alternate pose.)	Super Smash Bros.	Yes	No	No	No	No	No	No	No	Yes
Bowser	Super Smash Bros.	Yes	Read Only	Read Only	No	Read Only	Read Only	No	No	Yes
Bowser Jr.	Super Smash Bros.	Yes	No	Read Only	No	No	No	No	No	Yes
Byleth	Super Smash Bros.	No	No	No	No	No	No	No	No	Yes
Captain Falcon	Super Smash Bros.	Yes	Read Only	Read Only	No	Read Only	No	No	No	Yes
Charizard	Super Smash Bros.	Yes	No	Read Only	No	No	No	No	No	Yes
Chrom	Super Smash Bros.	No	No	No	No	No	No	No	No	Yes
Cloud	Super Smash Bros.	Yes	No	No	No	No	No	No	No	Yes
Corrin (Note: Produced as male or female Corrin. Female Corrin is branded as a Player 2 variant.)	Super Smash Bros.	Yes	No	No	No	No	No	No	No	Yes
Dark Pit	Super Smash Bros.	Yes	No	Read Only	No	No	No	No	No	Yes
Dark Samus	Super Smash Bros.	No	Read Only (Deluxe)	No	No	No	No	No	No	Yes
Daisy	Super Smash Bros.	No	Read Only (Deluxe)	No	No	No	No	No	No	Yes
Diddy Kong	Super Smash Bros.	Yes	No	Read Only	No	No	No	No	No	Yes
Donkey Kong	Super Smash Bros.	Yes	Read Only	Read Only	Read Only	Read Only	No	No	No	Yes
Dr. Mario	Super Smash Bros.	Yes	Read Only	Read Only	No	Read Only	Read Only	No	No	Yes
Duck Hunt	Super Smash Bros.	Yes	No	Read Only	No	No	No	No	No	Yes
Falco	Super Smash Bros.	Yes	No	Read Only	No	No	No	No	No	Yes
Fox	Super Smash Bros.	Yes	Read Only	Read Only	Read Only	Read Only	No	No	No	Yes
Ganondorf	Super Smash Bros.	Yes	Read Only (Deluxe)	Read Only	No	No	No	Read Only	No	Yes
Greninja	Super Smash Bros.	Yes	No	Read Only	No	No	No	No	No	Yes
Hero (Note: Only The Luminary from Dragon Quest XI)	Super Smash Bros.	No	No	No	No	No	No	No	No	Yes
Ice Climbers	Super Smash Bros.	No	No	No	No	No	No	No	No	Yes
Ike	Super Smash Bros.	Yes	No	Read Only	No	No	No	No	No	Yes
Incineroar	Super Smash Bros.	No	No	No	No	No	No	No	No	Yes
Inkling	Super Smash Bros.	No	Read Only (Deluxe)	Read Only	No	No	No	Read Only	No	Yes
Isabelle	Super Smash Bros.	No	Read Only (Deluxe)	Read Only	No	No	No	Read Only	No	Yes
Ivysaur	Super Smash Bros.	No	No	No	No	No	No	No	No	Yes
Jigglypuff	Super Smash Bros.	Yes	No	Read Only	No	No	No	No	No	Yes
Joker	Super Smash Bros.	No	No	No	No	No	No	No	No	Yes
Kazuya	Super Smash Bros.	No	No	No	No	No	No	No	No	Yes
Ken	Super Smash Bros.	No	No	No	No	No	No	No	No	Yes
King Dedede	Super Smash Bros.	Yes	Read Only (Deluxe)	Read Only	No	No	Read Only	No	No	Yes
King K. Rool	Super Smash Bros.	No	No	No	No	No	No	No	No	Yes
Kirby	Super Smash Bros.	Yes	Read Only	Read Only	Read Only	No	Read Only	No	No	Yes
Link	Super Smash Bros.	Yes	Read Only	Read Only	Read Only	Read Only	Read Only	Read Only	No	Yes
Little Mac	Super Smash Bros.	Yes	No	Read Only	No	No	No	No	No	Yes
Lucario	Super Smash Bros.	Yes	No	Read Only	No	No	No	No	No	Yes
Lucas	Super Smash Bros.	Yes	No	Read Only	No	No	No	No	No	Yes
Lucina	Super Smash Bros.	Yes	No	Read Only	No	No	No	No	No	Yes
Luigi	Super Smash Bros.	Yes	Read Only	Read Only	Read Only	Read Only	Read Only	No	No	Yes
Mario	Super Smash Bros.	Yes	Read Only	Read Only	Read Only	Read Only	Read Only	No	No	Yes
Marth	Super Smash Bros.	Yes	No	Read Only	Read Only	No	No	No	No	Yes
Mega Man (Note: Also produced in Gold in North America, which is included exclusively in the Mega Man Legacy Collection Collector's Edition bundle.)	Super Smash Bros.	Yes	Read Only	Read Only	No	No	No	No	No	Yes
Meta Knight	Super Smash Bros.	Yes	Read Only (Deluxe)	Read Only	No	No	Read Only	No	No	Yes
Mewtwo	Super Smash Bros.	Yes	No	Read Only	No	No	No	No	No	Yes
Mii Brawler	Super Smash Bros.	Yes	No	No	No	No	No	No	No	Yes
Mii Gunner	Super Smash Bros.	Yes	No	No	No	No	No	No	No	Yes
Mii Sword fighter	Super Smash Bros.	Yes	No	No	No	No	No	No	No	Yes
Min Min	Super Smash Bros.	No	No	No	No	No	No	No	No	Yes
Mr. Game & Watch (Note: Comes with four switchable poses.)	Super Smash Bros.	Yes	No	Read Only	No	No	No	No	No	Yes
Mythra	Super Smash Bros.	No	No	No	No	No	No	No	No	Yes
Ness	Super Smash Bros.	Yes	No	Read Only	No	No	No	No	No	Yes
Pac-Man	Super Smash Bros.	Yes	Read Only	Read Only	No	Read Only	No	No	No	Yes
Palutena	Super Smash Bros.	Yes	No	Read Only	No	No	No	No	No	Yes
Peach	Super Smash Bros.	Yes	Read Only	Read Only	No	Read Only	Read Only	No	No	Yes
Pichu	Super Smash Bros.	No	No	No	No	No	No	No	No	Yes
Piranha Plant	Super Smash Bros.	No	No	No	No	No	No	No	No	Yes
Pit	Super Smash Bros.	Yes	No	Read Only	No	No	No	No	No	Yes
Pikachu	Super Smash Bros.	Yes	No	Read Only	No	No	No	No	No	Yes
Pikmin & Olimar	Super Smash Bros.	Yes	Read Only	Read Only	No	Read Only	No	No	No	Yes
Pokémon Trainer	Super Smash Bros.	No	No	No	No	No	No	No	No	Yes
Pyra	Super Smash Bros.	No	No	No	No	No	No	No	No	Yes
Richter	Super Smash Bros.	No	No	No	No	No	No	No	No	Yes
Ridley	Super Smash Bros.	No	Read Only (Deluxe)	No	No	No	No	No	No	Yes
R.O.B. (Note: Produced in NES and Famicom colors, based on the color schemes of the respective video game consoles.)	Super Smash Bros.	Yes	No	Read Only	No	No	No	No	No	Yes
Robin	Super Smash Bros.	Yes	No	Read Only	No	No	No	No	No	Yes
Rosalina and Luma	Super Smash Bros.	Yes	Read Only	Read Only	No	No	No	No	No	Yes
Roy	Super Smash Bros.	Yes	No	No	No	No	No	No	No	Yes
Ryu	Super Smash Bros.	Yes	No	No	No	No	No	No	No	Yes
Samus	Super Smash Bros.	Yes	Read Only	Read Only	Read Only	Read Only	No	No	No	Yes
Sephiroth	Super Smash Bros.	No	No	No	No	No	No	No	No	Yes
Sheik	Super Smash Bros.	Yes	Read Only (Deluxe)	Read Only	No	Read Only	No	Read Only	No	Yes
Shulk	Super Smash Bros.	Yes	No	Read Only	No	No	No	No	No	Yes
Simon	Super Smash Bros.	No	No	No	No	No	No	No	No	Yes
Snake	Super Smash Bros.	No	No	No	No	No	No	No	No	Yes
Sonic	Super Smash Bros.	Yes	Read Only	Read Only	No	No	No	No	No	Yes
Sora	Super Smash Bros.	No	No	No	No	No	No	No	No	Yes
Squirtle	Super Smash Bros.	No	No	No	No	No	No	No	No	Yes
Steve	Super Smash Bros.	No	No	No	No	No	No	No	No	Yes
Toon Link	Super Smash Bros.	Yes	Read Only	Read Only	No	Read Only	Read Only	Read Only	No	Yes
Terry	Super Smash Bros.	No	No	No	No	No	No	No	No	Yes
Villager	Super Smash Bros.	Yes	Read Only	Read Only	No	No	No	Read Only	No	Yes
Wario	Super Smash Bros.	Yes	Read Only	Read Only	No	No	No	No	No	Yes
Wii Fit Trainer	Super Smash Bros.	Yes	No	Read Only	Read Only	No	No	No	No	Yes
Wolf	Super Smash Bros.	No	No	No	No	No	No	No	No	Yes
Yoshi	Super Smash Bros.	Yes	Read Only	Read Only	Read Only	No	Read Only	No	No	Yes
Young Link	Super Smash Bros.	Yes	Read Only	Read Only	Read Only	Read Only	Read Only	Read Only	No	Yes
Zelda	Super Smash Bros.	Yes	Read Only (Deluxe)	Read Only	No	Read Only	No	Read Only	No	Yes
Zero Suit Samus	Super Smash Bros.	Yes	Read Only	Read Only	No	Read Only	No	No	No	Yes
Noah	Xenoblade	No	No	No	No	No	No	No	No	No
Mio	Xenoblade	No	No	No	No	No	No	No	No	No
Yarn Poochy	Yoshi's Woolly World	No	No	No	No	No	No	No	Read Only	Read Only
Yarn Yoshi (Note: Produced in green, light blue and pink. Additionally, there is a green Mega Yarn Yoshi. Unlike other Amiibo figurines, these are made of real yarn.)	Yoshi's Woolly World	Yes	Read Only	Read Only	Read Only	No	Read Only	No	Read Only	Yes

Games with universal Amiibo support (read-only unless otherwise noted)

- Amiibo Tap: Nintendo's Greatest Bits
- Bayonetta 2 (Note: Exclusive to the Nintendo Switch version)
- Captain Toad: Treasure Tracker
- Chibi-Robo! Zip Lash (Note: The Chibi-Robo Amiibo has read/write support.)
- Donkey Kong Bananza
- Fire Emblem Awakening
- Fire Emblem Fates
- Fire Emblem: Three Houses
- Fire Emblem Warriors
- Hey! Pikmin (Note: The Pikmin Amiibo figure has read/write support.)
- Hyrule Warriors
- Hyrule Warriors Legends
- Hyrule Warriors: Age of Calamity
- Kirby and the Rainbow Curse
- Kirby Battle Royale
- Kirby: Planet Robobot
- Kirby's Blowout Blast
- Kirby's Extra Epic Yarn
- The Legend of Zelda: Breath of the Wild
- The Legend of Zelda: Echoes of Wisdom
- The Legend of Zelda: Tears of the Kingdom
- Luigi's Mansion
- Mario & Luigi: Bowser's Inside Story + Bowser Jr.'s Journey
- Mario & Luigi: Paper Jam
- Mario & Luigi: Superstar Saga + Bowser's Minions
- Mario & Sonic at the Rio 2016 Olympic Games
- Mario Party 10 (Note: All varieties of the Bowser, Donkey Kong, Luigi, Mario, Peach, Rosalina, Toad, Wario, and Yoshi Amiibo have read/write support.)
- Mario Party: Star Rush
- Mario Party: The Top 100
- Mario Sports Superstars (Note: The Mario Sports Superstars Amiibo cards have read/write support.)
- Mario Tennis: Ultra Smash
- Mario Tennis Fever
- Metroid Prime: Blast Ball
- Metroid Prime: Federation Force
- Miitopia (Note: Cards are not supported.)
- Mini Mario & Friends: Amiibo Challenge (Note: Not compatible with amiibo cards.)
- Monster Hunter Stories (Note: The Barioth and Avinia, Navirou, One-Eyed Rathalos and Female Rider, One-Eyed Rathalos and Male Rider, Qurupeco and Dan, and Rathian and Cheval Amiibo have read/write support.)
- Pokkén Tournament
- Poochy & Yoshi's Woolly World (Note: The Yarn Poochy and Yarn Yoshi Amiibo have read/write support.)
- Star Fox Zero
- Style Savvy: Fashion Forward
- Style Savvy: Styling Star
- Super Kirby Clash
- Super Mario 3D World + Bowser's Fury
- Super Mario Bros. Wonder – Nintendo Switch 2 Edition + Meetup at Bellabel Park
- Super Mario Galaxy + Super Mario Galaxy 2
- Super Mario Odyssey
- Super Mario Party
- Taiko no Tatsujin: Atsumete ☆ Tomodachi Daisakusen!
- Team Kirby Clash Deluxe
- Teddy Together
- WarioWare Gold
- Word Puzzles by POWGI
- Xenoblade Chronicles 3
- Yoshi's Crafted World
- Yoshi's Woolly World (Note: The Yarn Yoshi Amiibo have read/write support.)

Games with series specific Amiibo support
Supported game	Compatible Amiibo (read-only)	Compatible Amiibo (read/write)	Series
Animal Crossing: Amiibo Festival	Animal Crossing Amiibo cards (Series 1, 2, 3, 4, and other cards); Villager	Blathers; Celeste; Cyrus; Digby; Isabelle (both varieties); K.K.; Kapp'n; Kicks; Lottie; Mabel; Reese; Resetti; Rover; Timmy & Tommy; Tom Nook; AC: Happy Home Designer only: Animal Crossing Amiibo cards (Series 1, 2, 3, 4 and other cards)	Animal Crossing
Animal Crossing: Happy Home Designer	Villager	Blathers; Celeste; Cyrus; Digby; Isabelle (both varieties); K.K.; Kapp'n; Kicks; Lottie; Mabel; Reese; Resetti; Rover; Timmy & Tommy; Tom Nook; AC: Happy Home Designer only: Animal Crossing Amiibo cards (Series 1, 2, 3, 4 and other cards)	Animal Crossing
Azure Striker Gunvolt 2	Shovel Knight	None	Shovel Knight
Azure Striker Gunvolt: Striker Pack	Shovel Knight	None	Shovel Knight
Cyber Shadow	King Knight; Plague Knight; Shovel Knight; Specter Knight	None	Shovel Knight
Shovel Knight	King Knight; Plague Knight; Specter Knight	Shovel Knight	Shovel Knight
Code Name: S.T.E.A.M.	Ike; Lucina; Marth; Robin	None	Fire Emblem
Fire Emblem Fates	Ike; Lucina; Marth; Robin		Fire Emblem
Fire Emblem Echoes: Shadows of Valentia	Corrin (both varieties); Ike; Lucina; Marth; Robin; Roy	Alm; Celica	Fire Emblem
Bye-Bye BoxBoy!	King Dedede (both varieties); Kirby (both varieties); Meta Knight (both varieties); Waddle Dee; Qbby	None	Kirby Kirby Battle Royale and Bye-Bye BoxBoy! only: BoxBoy! series
Kirby Battle Royale	King Dedede (both varieties); Kirby (both varieties); Meta Knight (both varieties); Waddle Dee; Qbby	None	Kirby Kirby Battle Royale and Bye-Bye BoxBoy! only: BoxBoy! series
Kirby's Blowout Blast	King Dedede (both varieties); Kirby (both varieties); Meta Knight (both varieties); Waddle Dee	None	Kirby Kirby Battle Royale and Bye-Bye BoxBoy! only: BoxBoy! series
Kirby and the Rainbow Curse	King Dedede (both varieties); Kirby (both varieties); Meta Knight (both varieties)	None	Kirby Kirby Battle Royale and Bye-Bye BoxBoy! only: BoxBoy! series
The Legend of Zelda: Link's Awakening	Bokoblin; Daruk; Ganondorf (all varieties); Guardian; Link/Toon Link (all varieties); Mipha; Revali; Sheik; Toon Link; Urbosa; Wolf Link; Zelda/Sheik (all varieties)	None	The Legend of Zelda
The Legend of Zelda: Twilight Princess HD	Ganondorf; Link/Toon Link (all varieties); Zelda/Sheik (all varieties)	Wolf Link	The Legend of Zelda
Little Nightmares	Pac-Man	None	Pac-Man
Mario & Luigi: Paper Jam	None	Bowser (all varieties); Luigi (both varieties); Mario (all varieties); Peach (both varieties); Toad; Yoshi (all varieties); Mario Tennis: Ultra Smash only: Bowser Jr.; Donkey Kong (all varieties); Rosalina/Rosalina and Luma; Wario (both varieties)	Super Mario
Mario Tennis: Ultra Smash	None	Bowser (all varieties); Luigi (both varieties); Mario (all varieties); Peach (both varieties); Toad; Yoshi (all varieties); Mario Tennis: Ultra Smash only: Bowser Jr.; Donkey Kong (all varieties); Rosalina/Rosalina and Luma; Wario (both varieties)	Super Mario
Mario Sports Superstars	Mario Sports Superstars Amiibo cards	None	Super Mario
Mario & Sonic at the Rio 2016 Olympic Games	Mario (all varieties); Sonic	None	Mario & Sonic
Mega Man Legacy Collection	Mega Man (both varieties)	None	Mega Man
Mega Man Legacy Collection 2	Mega Man (both varieties)	None	Mega Man
Mega Man 11	Mega Man (both varieties)	None	Mega Man
Niconico	Callie; Marie	None	Splatoon
Splatoon	Callie; Inkling Boy (all varieties); Inkling Girl (all varieties); Inkling Squid (all varieties); Marie	None	Splatoon
Splatoon 2	None	Callie; Inkling Boy (all varieties); Inkling Girl (all varieties); Inkling Squid (all varieties); Marie; Marina; Octoling Boy; Octoling Girl; Octoling Octopus; Pearl; Splatoon 3 only: Big Man; Callie (Alterna); Frye; Inkling (Yellow); Marie (Alterna); Marina (Side Order); Octoling (Blue); Pearl (Side Order); Shiver; Smallfry	Splatoon
Splatoon 3	None	Callie; Inkling Boy (all varieties); Inkling Girl (all varieties); Inkling Squid (all varieties); Marie; Marina; Octoling Boy; Octoling Girl; Octoling Octopus; Pearl; Splatoon 3 only: Big Man; Callie (Alterna); Frye; Inkling (Yellow); Marie (Alterna); Marina (Side Order); Octoling (Blue); Pearl (Side Order); Shiver; Smallfry	Splatoon
Star Fox Guard	Falco; Fox	None	Star Fox
Star Fox Zero	Falco; Fox	None	Star Fox
Star Fox	Falco; Fox; Wolf	None	Star Fox
Xenoblade Chronicles 3D	Shulk	None	Xenoblade

=== List of Animal Crossing Amiibo cards ===
The following is a list of all confirmed Amiibo cards for the Animal Crossing series of games. Series 1, 2, 3 and 4 consist of 100 cards each, while Series 5 consists of 48 cards. Additionally, there are five cards which aren't part of any series. After the announcement that New Leaf would receive an Amiibo update a new series of 50 Animal Crossing RV cards was announced plus an additional series of 6 cards based around characters by Sanrio. Later, after a Nintendo Direct on September 23, 2021, Nintendo confirmed on the official Animal Crossing Twitter account that a Series 5 of Amiibo cards was being produced and implied it may feature villagers introduced in Animal Crossing: New Horizons, as well as returning villagers. Series 5 was released on November 5, 2021.

Series 1
Card number	Character
001	Isabelle
002	Tom Nook
003	DJ K.K.
004	Sable
005	Kapp'n
006	Resetti
007	Joan
008	Timmy
009	Digby
010	Pascal
011	Harriet
012	Redd
013	Saharah
014	Luna
015	Tortimer
016	Lyle
017	Lottie
018	Bob
019	Fauna
020	Curt
021	Portia
022	Leonardo
023	Cheri
024	Kyle
025	Al
026	Renée
027	Lopez
028	Jambette
029	Rasher
030	Tiffany
031	Sheldon
032	Bluebear
033	Bill
034	Kiki
035	Deli
036	Alli
037	Kabuki
038	Patty
039	Jitters
040	Gigi
041	Quillson
042	Marcie
043	Puck
044	Shari
045	Octavian
046	Winnie
047	Knox
048	Sterling
049	Bonbon
050	Punchy
051	Opal
052	Poppy
053	Limberg
054	Deena
055	Snake
056	Bangle
057	Phil
058	Monique
059	Nate
060	Samson
061	Tutu
062	T-Bone
063	Mint
064	Pudge
065	Midge
066	Gruff
067	Flurry
068	Clyde
069	Bella
070	Biff
071	Yuka
072	Lionel
073	Flo
074	Cobb
075	Amelia
076	Jeremiah
077	Cherry
078	Roscoe
079	Truffles
080	Eugene
081	Eunice
082	Goose
083	Annalisa
084	Benjamin
085	Pancetti
086	Chief
087	Bunnie
088	Clay
089	Diana
090	Axel
091	Muffy
092	Henry
093	Bertha
094	Cyrano
095	Peanut
096	Cole
097	Willow
098	Roald
099	Molly
100	Walker

Series 2
Card number	Character
101	K.K.
102	Reese
103	Kicks
104	Labelle
105	Copper
106	Booker
107	Katie
108	Tommy
109	Porter
110	Leila
111	Shrunk
112	Don
113	Isabelle
114	Blanca
115	Nat
116	Chip
117	Jack
118	Poncho
119	Felicity
120	Ozzie
121	Tia
122	Lucha
123	Fuchsia
124	Harry
125	Gwen
126	Coach
127	Kitt
128	Tom
129	Tipper
130	Prince
131	Pate
132	Vladimir
133	Savannah
134	Kidd
135	Phoebe
136	Egbert
137	Cookie
138	Sly
139	Blaire
140	Avery
141	Nana
142	Peck
143	Olivia
144	Cesar
145	Carmen
146	Rodney
147	Scoot
148	Whitney
149	Broccolo
150	Coco
151	Groucho
152	Wendy
153	Alfonso
154	Rhonda
155	Butch
156	Gabi
157	Moose
158	Timbra
159	Zell
160	Pekoe
161	Teddy
162	Mathilda
163	Ed
164	Bianca
165	Filbert
166	Kitty
167	Beau
168	Nan
169	Bud
170	Ruby
171	Benedict
172	Agnes
173	Julian
174	Bettina
175	Jay
176	Sprinkle
177	Flip
178	Hugh
179	Hopper
180	Pecan
181	Drake
182	Alice
183	Camofrog
184	Anicotti
185	Chops
186	Charlise
187	Vic
188	Ankha
189	Drift
190	Vesta
191	Marcel
192	Pango
193	Keaton
194	Gladys
195	Hamphrey
196	Freya
197	Kid Cat
198	Agent S
199	Big Top
200	Rocket

Series 3
Card number	Character
201	Rover
202	Blathers
203	Tom Nook
204	Pelly
205	Phyllis
206	Pete
207	Mabel
208	Leif
209	Wendell
210	Cyrus
211	Grams
212	Timmy
213	Digby
214	Don
215	Isabelle
216	Franklin
217	Jingle
218	Lily
219	Anchovy
220	Tabby
221	Kody
222	Miranda
223	Del
224	Paula
225	Ken
226	Mitzi
227	Rodeo
228	Bubbles
229	Cousteau
230	Velma
231	Elvis
232	Canberra
233	Colton
234	Marina
235	Spork
236	Freckles
237	Bam
238	Friga
239	Ricky
240	Deirdre
241	Hans
242	Chevre
243	Drago
244	Tangy
245	Mac
246	Eloise
247	Wart Jr.
248	Hazel
249	Beardo
250	Ava
251	Chester
252	Merry
253	Genji
254	Greta
255	Wolfgang
256	Diva
257	Klaus
258	Daisy
259	Stinky
260	Tammi
261	Tucker
262	Blanche
263	Gaston
264	Marshal
265	Gala
266	Joey
267	Pippy
268	Buck
269	Bree
270	Rooney
271	Curlos
272	Skye
273	Moe
274	Flora
275	Hamlet
276	Astrid
277	Monty
278	Dora
279	Biskit
280	Victoria
281	Lyman
282	Violet
283	Frank
284	Chadder
285	Merengue
286	Cube
287	Claudia
288	Curly
289	Boomer
290	Caroline
291	Sparro
292	Baabara
293	Rolf
294	Maple
295	Antonio
296	Soleil
297	Apollo
298	Derwin
299	Francine
300	Chrissy

Series 4
Card number	Character
301	Isabelle
302	Brewster
303	Katrina
304	Phineas
305	Celeste
306	Tommy
307	Gracie
308	Leilani
309	Resetti
310	Timmy
311	Lottie
312	Shrunk
313	Pavé
314	Gulliver
315	Redd
316	Zipper
317	Goldie
318	Stitches
319	Pinky
320	Mott
321	Mallary
322	Rocco
323	Katt
324	Graham
325	Peaches
326	Dizzy
327	Penelope
328	Boone
329	Broffina
330	Croque
331	Pashmina
332	Shep
333	Lolly
334	Erik
335	Dotty
336	Pierce
337	Queenie
338	Fang
339	Frita
340	Tex
341	Melba
342	Bones
343	Anabelle
344	Rudy
345	Naomi
346	Peewee
347	Tammy
348	Olaf
349	Lucy
350	Elmer
351	Puddles
352	Rory
353	Elise
354	Walt
355	Mira
356	Pietro
357	Aurora
358	Papi
359	Apple
360	Rod
361	Purrl
362	Static
363	Celia
364	Zucker
365	Peggy
366	Ribbot
367	Annalise
368	Chow
369	Sylvia
370	Jacques
371	Sally
372	Doc
373	Pompom
374	Tank
375	Becky
376	Rizzo
377	Sydney
378	Barold
379	Nibbles
380	Kevin
381	Gloria
382	Lobo
383	Hippeux
384	Margie
385	Lucky
386	Rosie
387	Rowan
388	Maelle
389	Bruce
390	O'Hare
391	Gayle
392	Cranston
393	Frobert
394	Grizzly
395	Cally
396	Simon
397	Iggly
398	Angus
399	Twiggy
400	Robin

Series 5
Card number	Character
401	Tom Nook
402	Timmy and Tommy
403	Isabelle
404	Orville
405	Wilbur
406	Blathers
407	Celeste
408	Mabel
409	Sable
410	Label
411	K.K. Slider
412	C.J.
413	Flick
414	Daisy Mae
415	Kicks
416	Saharah
417	Harvey
418	Gulliver
419	Wisp
420	Lottie
421	Niko
422	Wardell
423	Tom Nook
424	Isabelle
425	Sherb
426	Megan
427	Dom
428	Audie
429	Cyd
430	Judy
431	Raymond
432	Reneigh
433	Sasha
434	Ione
435	Tiansheng
436	Shino
437	Marlo
438	Petri
439	Cephalobot
440	Quinn
441	Chabwick
442	Zoe
443	Ace
444	Rio
445	Frett
446	Azalea
447	Roswell
448	Faith

Other cards
Card number	Character
CP	Isabelle (Note: This is a promotional card included with Japanese magazine Chara Parfait (キャラぱふぇ), issue September/October 2015, released on August 1, 2015. The original Japanese card name is しずえ (Shizue). Isabelle's artwork is based on that of card 001, but shows her in a different pose.)
CP	K.K. (Note: This is a promotional card that was included with Japanese magazine Picopuri (ぴこぷり), issue April–June 2016, released on March 15, 2016. Original Japanese card name is とたけけ (Totakeke). K.K.'s artwork is based on that of card 101, but shows him in a different pose.)
Leaf	Goldie (Note: This Amiibo card is exclusively available with first print copies of Animal Crossing: Amiibo Festival.)
Leaf	Rosie
Leaf	Stitches

RV Series
Card number	Character
01	Vivian
02	Hopkins
03	June
04	Piper
05	Paolo
06	Hornsby
07	Stella
08	Tybalt
09	Huck
10	Sylvana
11	Boris
12	Wade
13	Carrie
14	Ketchup
15	Rex
16	Stu
17	Ursala
18	Jacob
19	Maddie
20	Billy
21	Boyd
22	Bitty
23	Maggie
24	Murphy
25	Plucky
26	Sandy
27	Claude
28	Raddle
29	Julia
30	Louie
31	Bea
32	Admiral
33	Ellie
34	Boots
35	Weber
36	Candi
37	Leopold
38	Spike
39	Cashmere
40	Tad
41	Norma
42	Gonzo
43	Sprocket
44	Snooty
45	Olive
46	Dobie
47	Buzz
48	Cleo
49	Ike
50	Tasha

Sanrio RV Series
Card number	Character
S1	Rilla
S2	Marty
S3	Étoile
S4	Chai
S5	Chelsea
S6	Toby

=== Exclusives ===
In North America, Australia, and New Zealand, at launch some Amiibo were only available in selected retailers. In Australia and New Zealand, this practice is limited to Mario (Silver Edition), Dark Hammer Slam Bowser, and Dark Turbo Charge Donkey Kong being limited to EB Games, Mario (Gold Edition) being limited to Target in Australia and Mighty Ape in New Zealand, Animal Crossing: New Leaf – Welcome Amiibo Sanrio Collaboration Pack and Qbby Amiibo being limited to the Official Nintendo AU/NZ eBay Store; however, in North America it is much more widespread. Some characters, such as Villager, were originally non-exclusives, but later became exclusive to retailers during restocks. Mexican video game retailer GamePlanet had Greninja, Rosalina, Ike and Palutena as exclusives at launch.

== See also ==
- Nintendo e-Reader
- GameCube – Game Boy Advance link cable
- Transfer Pak
- VMU
