= Mario Sports Superstars =

2017 video game

- Promotional art, showcasing some of the game's playable sports and characters
- Developers: Bandai Namco Studios; Camelot Software Planning (Note: tri-Crescendo assisted with development.)
- Publisher: Nintendo
- Composer: Motoi Sakuraba
- Series: Mario Sports
- Platform: Nintendo 3DS
- Release: PAL: March 10, 2017; NA: March 24, 2017; JP: March 30, 2017
- Genre: Sports
- Modes: Single-player, multiplayer

Mario Sports Superstars is a 2017 sports video game developed by Bandai Namco Studios and Camelot Software Planning and published by Nintendo for the Nintendo 3DS. The game contains five different sports: association football (soccer), baseball, tennis, golf, and horse racing.

The game received mixed reviews from critics, who praised its gameplay, variety, online multiplayer, and presentation, but criticized its usage of amiibo cards and lack of content and distinctive elements in every sport compared to individual Mario Sports titles, with many considering it inferior to standalone Mario Sports games.

== Gameplay ==
The game consists of five sports – association football (soccer), baseball, tennis, golf, and horse racing. Despite the number of sports contained, they are not mini-games, but rather, full-scale recreations of each sport. For example, the soccer part of the game contains eleven versus eleven gameplay, the same as is standard in the sport. Each individual sport contains single player tournaments, local multiplayer, and online multiplayer game modes. The game's Tennis mode features the return of Chance Shots from Mario Tennis Open and Jump Shots and Ultra Smashes from Mario Tennis: Ultra Smash while its Golf mode is based on the gameplay of Mario Golf: World Tour. The aesthetics of both modes are also based and built upon those from Open and World Tour.

== Development ==
The game was first announced during a Nintendo Direct on September 1, 2016. The title was co-developed by Bandai Namco Studios and Camelot Software Planning, with the latter having developed games in the Mario Golf and Mario Tennis series. tri-Crescendo assisted on design. While Nintendo's Mario Sports line has featured stand-alone entries in soccer (Mario Strikers), baseball (Mario Super Sluggers), tennis (Mario Tennis) and golf (Mario Golf), they had never featured horse racing, or compiled all these sports into one compilation. The game was released in PAL regions on March 10, 2017, in North America on March 24, 2017, and in Japan on March 30, 2017. As with Camelot's previous Mario sports games, the soundtrack was written by Motoi Sakuraba.

== Reception ==
Reception

Aggregate scores
Aggregator	Score
Metacritic	62/100
OpenCritic	18% recommend

Review scores
Publication	Score
Destructoid	5/10
Game Informer	6.5/10
Nintendo Life	5/10
Nintendo World Report	5.5/10

Mario Sports Superstars received "mixed or average" reviews from critics, according to the review aggregation website Metacritic. Fellow review aggregator OpenCritic assessed that the game received weak approval, being recommended by only 18% of critics.

The mostly mixed reviews from critics praised its gameplay, variety, online multiplayer, and presentation, but criticized its use of amiibo cards and lack of content and distinctive elements in every sport compared to individual Mario Sports titles, with many considering it inferior to standalone Mario Sports games.

Nintendo Life stated that the game had "plenty of variety and content to offer with a robust multiplayer mode for anyone that wants all their Mario sports in one convenient package". Nintendo Life noted that "the games have been stripped of power-ups, items and special arcade-style modes" all standalone Mario Sports games had and considered that, despite being a compilation game featuring five sports, the game had "less content than Mario Tennis: Ultra Smash", which was also criticized for its lack of content.

GameInformer praised the core gameplay of all sports and stated "They all provide pick-up-and-play gameplay that makes them accessible to players of any skill level." while Nintendo Life highlighted the game shined as a multiplayer title especially online.

Destructoid criticized the amiibo cards of the game and their usage in the game, calling it a "lazy experience, one developed solely for the purpose of selling what are basically Mario-branded Topps cards."

Nintendo Life considered that while the game was a compilation of five games in one it failed to offer "a definitive version of anything" and added that "as a multiplayer title it could be fun to climb the ranks online, but as a single player experience it's totally functional yet painfully lifeless". They concluded that "Sports Superstars laid out the groundwork, but just needed to take a few more risks".

By May 2017, the game had sold over 92,829 copies in Japan.
