= Mario Tennis: Ultra Smash =

2015 video game

- Packaging artwork depicting Mario performing a Jump shot
- Developer: Camelot Software Planning
- Publisher: Nintendo
- Director: Shugo Takahashi
- Producers: Hiroyuki Takahashi; Shugo Takahashi; Toshiharu Izuno
- Designers: Hiroyuki Takahashi; Shugo Takahashi
- Programmers: Haruki Kodera; Yutaka Yamamoto
- Artist: Teppei Kamata
- Composer: Motoi Sakuraba
- Series: Mario Tennis
- Platform: Wii U
- Release: NA/EU: November 20, 2015; AU: November 21, 2015; JP: January 28, 2016
- Genre: Sports game
- Modes: Single-player, multiplayer

Mario Tennis: Ultra Smash (Note: マリオテニス ウルトラスマッシュ (Mario Tenisu Urutora Sumasshu)) is a 2015 sports game in the Mario Tennis series developed by Camelot Software Planning and published by Nintendo for the Wii U, released internationally in November 2015, and released in Japan in January 2016. It is the first Mario Tennis game to feature simultaneous online worldwide multiplayer.

The game received mixed reviews from critics; it was criticized for a lack of additional modes, its smaller character roster than prior entries, and a perceived lack of enough innovation, with many deeming the game to be inferior to previous installments in terms of content, although its audiovisual presentation, gameplay, and multiplayer were praised.

== Gameplay ==
Gameplay screenshot at E3 2015

Before starting a match, players choose from four modes, 16 playable characters, and determine whether to compete in 1-on-1 matches or 2-on-2 doubles matches. From there, a court option is picked; each court is themed as a different texture of ground, which affects the ball in speed and bounce. Matches include four occurring abilities: Chance Shots are glowing spots on the ground, and upon standing over it and pressing a certain button combination, allows the player to pull off a powerful move; Jump Shots, an ability that allows the player to jump up and hit the ball resulting in a faster and longer-ranged shot; the titular Ultra Smash, a unique kind of Jump Shot which serves as a punishment mechanic only possible when the opponent loses form when returning a shot and allows the player to perform a very fast and powerful Smash shot; and the Mega Mushroom, a mushroom thrown onto either sides of the court that causes the player to grow in size, allowing stronger and more distant hits on the ball. The game does not require motion controls.

The game has a total of four modes, including Mega Battle. Classic Tennis allows for creating a custom rule set, being able to remove Chance Shots, Jump Shots, or Mega Mushrooms, making the gameplay similar to that of Mario Tennis games prior to Mario Tennis Open. Knockback Challenge is a single-player endurance mode, where the player competes against opponents, increasing in difficulty after each win. Online multiplayer supports single or multiplayer; players compete against worldwide opponents in either Mega Battle or Classic Tennis.

The game supports amiibo functionality, where the player can train the character through artificial intelligence to compete in matches similarly to the player, in a similar fashion to the Super Smash Bros. series. The trained amiibo can compete as an additional competitor in online matches.

== Development ==
Camelot Software Planning, the creators of previous Mario Tennis games, developed Ultra Smash. The game, upon its reveal, was announced for Holiday 2015, later being released on November 20, 2015. According to the director, Shugo Takahashi, the developers aimed to create a game that was generally simple enough to "give anyone the taste of how tennis is interesting"; they compared their concept to Mario Tennis on the Nintendo 64.

The Jump Shot was an idea requested by Nintendo early into development. It was implemented due to the move having multiple gateway elements that could add a layer of strategy, such as where and how to hit the ball. Mega Battle was proposed by Camelot, of which the idea was created from considering concepts that could be used with HD graphics as the series first HD game. The idea was implemented so players could have "Mario-ish features while playing tennis". Takahashi stated that there was constant trial and error creating larger-scale models, such as being able to see the ball and creating a proper hitbox. Similar courses were created to have a sense of unity.

Halfway through development, Nintendo wanted the game to have amiibo functionality. They conceptualized the concept of training a character to play like the player, similar to Super Smash Bros. for Nintendo 3DS and Wii U. Camelot proceeded with the idea, due to the company being familiar with the role-playing game genre, having developed games of the genre in the past.

The "Classic Tennis" mode of the game was created for players who wanted to test their skills without Chance Shots, Jump Shots, or Mega Mushrooms and enjoy unaltered rallies without them or Power Shots like in Mario Tennis for the Nintendo 64 and Game Boy Color, as while Power Shots could be turned off in Mario Power Tennis and Mario Tennis: Power Tour, Chance Shots couldn't be turned off in Mario Tennis Open.

Ultra Smash also introduced simultaneous worldwide online multiplayer, after Mario Tennis Open only featured online multiplayer locked to the game's region. The developers at first thought that "a worldwide online versus would be impossible" but Takahashi believed that "if they could realize it, it would be definitely interesting", so they put a lot of power into making it a reality.

=== Characters ===
"Speaking of Boo, when we wanted to add the character in MT64, Nintendo was strongly against it. They said 'Boo can't even wield a racket'."

— Producer Hiroyuki Takahashi, 2016 Nintendo Everything interview

Deciding the roster, Camelot used pre-existing characters from older franchises in hopes that players would gravitate towards characters they recognized. Each character's skills were determined based on their appearance. Using this, the developers found it difficult to balance the skills for each character alongside the opinions of stats from the fans. They considered Mario to be the most difficult to compare and balance, due to him being the "starter character" that could not be too strong or too weak.

== Reception ==
Reception

Aggregate score
Aggregator	Score
Metacritic	58/100

Review scores
Publication	Score
Destructoid	5.5/10
Eurogamer	3/5
Game Informer	6.75/10
GameRevolution	3/5
GameSpot	6/10
GamesRadar+	3/5
GameTrailers	5.7/10
IGN	4.8/10
Nintendo Life	5/10
Nintendo World Report	3.5/10

Ultra Smash received "mixed or average" reviews, according to video game review aggregator website Metacritic. Fellow review aggregator OpenCritic assessed that the game received weak approval from critics.

IGN's Marty Sliva gave the game 4.8 out of 10, calling it "a bare-bones, lackluster addition to Mario's sporting adventures". He also compared it unfavorably to its predecessors by stating "that Mario Power Tennis on the GameCube managed to include more characters, interesting modes, and varied courses a decade ago is a bit insulting." GameSpot's Scott Butterworth similarly criticized the lack of game modes and alternate ways to play and awarded the game 6 out of 10. Nintendo World Report's Daan Koopman lambasted the game for all of the game's courts sharing the stadium aesthetic, lacking online friend pairing options, and less features than the previous three entries. Game Informer's Kyle Hilliard praised the game's core gameplay, new HD graphics, and music while also criticizing its lack of content, stating that "Mario Tennis Ultra Smash offers that same fun, silly take on tennis, but it doesn't provide much outside of the well-executed core game." concluding that "There is a great straightforward tennis game here, but little else to hook you in and keep you coming back".
