= New Nintendo 2DS XL =

Handheld game console

New Nintendo 2DS XL; New Nintendo 2DS LL
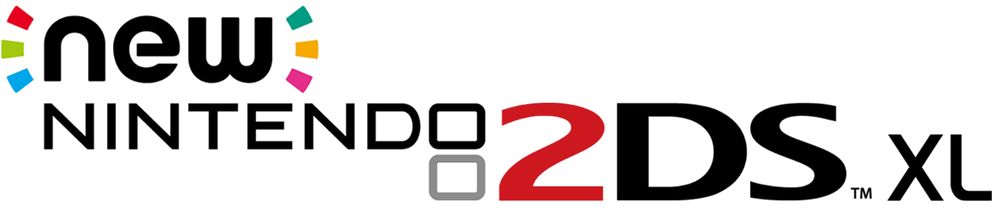

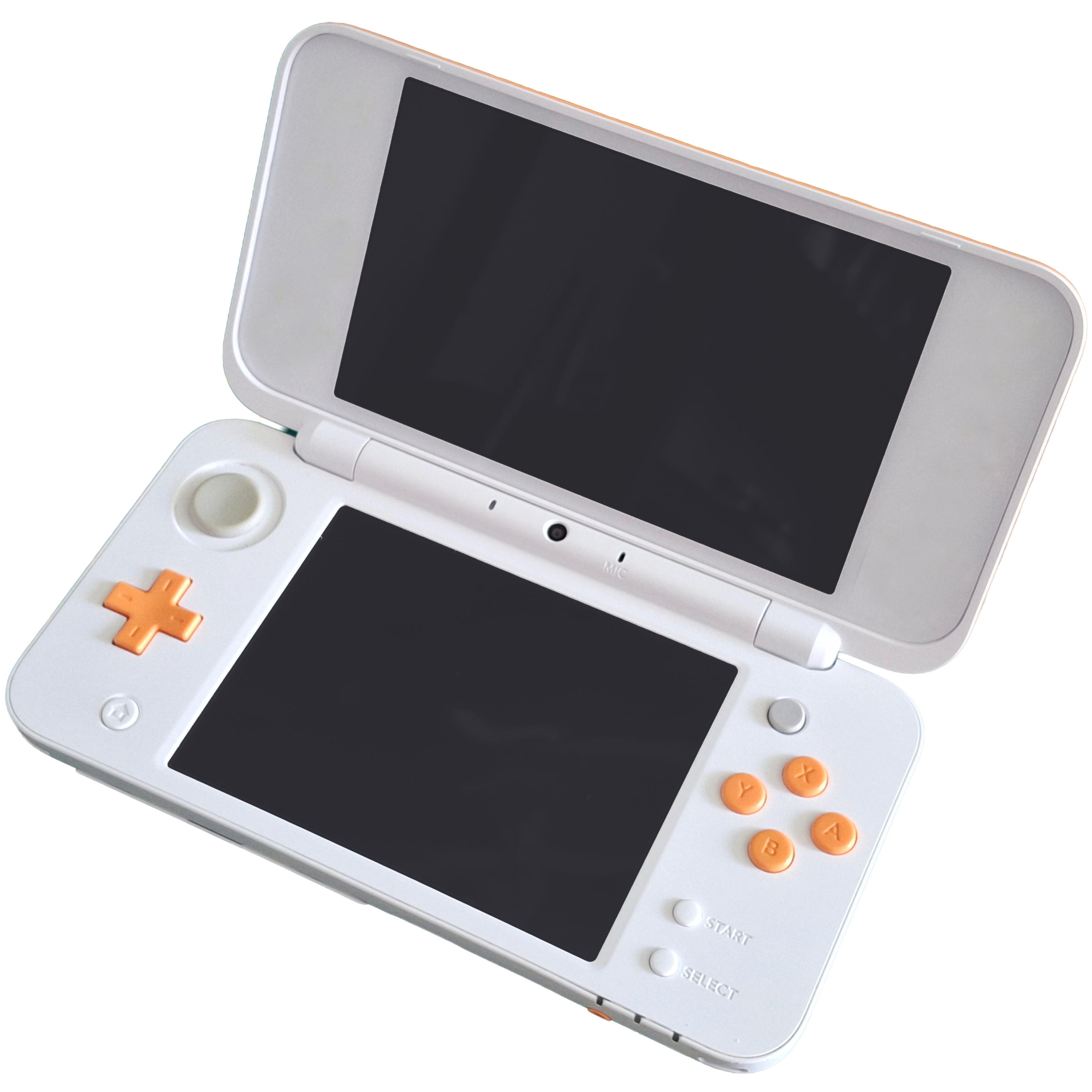
- The New Nintendo 2DS XL in the "White/Orange" color
- Also known as: New Nintendo 2DS LL (Japan)
- Product family: Nintendo 3DS family
- Type: Handheld game console
- Generation: Eighth
- Released: AU: 15 June 2017; JP/KOR: 13 July 2017; NA/EU: 28 July 2017
- Discontinued: WW: Q1 2020; NA: 16 September 2020
- Media: Physical and digital: Nintendo 3DS Game Card Nintendo DS Game Card Nintendo DSi Game Card Digital distribution (Nintendo eShop) microSD/SDHC card
- Operating system: Nintendo 3DS system software
- Removable storage: microSD card (up to 32 GB)
- Display: Upper: 4.88" LCD; Lower: 4.18" resistive touchscreen LCD (Both are TN Panels)
- Sound: Speakers, microphone
- Camera: Front-facing camera, 2 rear-facing cameras
- Current firmware: 11.17.0-50, as of 22 May 2023; 3 years ago
- Dimensions: Body: Open Width: 6.4 in (16 cm) Height: 6.3 in (16 cm) Depth: 0.8 in (2.0 cm) Folded Width: 3.4 in (8.6 cm) Height: 6.3 in (16 cm) Depth: 0.8 in (2.0 cm)
- Weight: 260 grams (9.2 oz)
- Backward compatibility: Nintendo DS/DSi; Nintendo 3DS
- Predecessor: Nintendo DS/DSi; Nintendo 3DS
- Successor: Nintendo Switch
- Related: Nintendo 3DS; Nintendo 2DS; New Nintendo 3DS

The New Nintendo 2DS XL (branded as New Nintendo 2DS LL (Note: Nyū Nintendō Tsū Dī Esu Eru Eru (Newニンテンドー2DSLL)) in Japan) is a foldable dual-screen handheld game console marketed by Nintendo. It is the sixth and final system in the Nintendo 3DS family of handheld consoles, and was released in Australia and New Zealand on 15 June 2017, in Japan and South Korea on 13 July 2017, and in North America and Europe on 28 July 2017. The model was discontinued in Japan, Europe, Australia and other regions (except for North America) by 31 March 2020 along with all other Nintendo 3DS models. It was discontinued in North America on 16 September 2020.

Serving as a companion to the Nintendo 2DS, the New Nintendo 2DS XL is based on the hardware of the New Nintendo 3DS, but with no autostereoscopic 3D display, its microphone and camera moved to the hinge, and speakers moved to the lower half of the device. As with the New Nintendo 3DS, it has an updated processor, an analog pointing stick known as the C-Stick, and additional shoulder triggers, and near-field communications (NFC) support for Amiibo for use in compatible games. According to Nintendo Support, the battery of the console lasts 3.5 to 5.5 hours when playing 3DS games, 7 to 9 hours when playing Nintendo DS games, and around 3 days when in sleep mode.

The New Nintendo 2DS XL received positive reviews, with critics noting that it combined traits of the Nintendo 2DS and New Nintendo 3DS XL into a more ergonomic and aesthetically pleasing device over the slate-shaped Nintendo 2DS, but noting slight regressions in display and speaker quality.

As of 31 March 2021, a total of 4.8 million New Nintendo 2DS XL consoles were sold, with 1.24 million sold in Japan, 1.83 million sold in North America and 1.73 million sold in other regions (including Europe and Australia).

== History ==
Nintendo presented the "Black/Turquoise" version of the console for the North American market, and the "White/Orange" version of the console for the Japanese, South Korean and PAL region market, as well as a Japan-exclusive Dragon Quest XI limited edition. Later, the "White/Orange" variant came to North America, as well as "Lavender/White", "Black/Green" (both Japan-exclusive) as well as Poké Ball and Pikachu variants to coincide with the launch of Pokémon Ultra Sun and Ultra Moon (the former also coming to that region).

A New Nintendo 2DS XL in the "Black/Turquoise" color

In July 2018, a "Hylian Shield" variant was released as a GameStop exclusive in North America, bundled with a pre-installed copy of The Legend of Zelda: A Link Between Worlds. This came alongside an Animal Crossing: New Leaf variant for Europe and Japan, and red/black Mario Kart 7 and Minecraft Creeper styles exclusive to Europe. The Minecraft Creeper variant was also sold in Australia, and Japan.

A month later, in August, Nintendo announced a new version of the console, "Purple/Silver", which would release in September 2018. Additionally, Nintendo confirmed that all future shipments of the "Black/Turquoise", "White/Orange" and "Purple/Silver" models would come with a pre-installed copy of Mario Kart 7.

As of 17 September 2020, the New Nintendo 2DS XL and all other remaining models in the Nintendo 3DS family have been discontinued by Nintendo.

== Hardware ==
Like the Nintendo 2DS, the New Nintendo 2DS XL lacks 3D functionality but otherwise has similar hardware to the New Nintendo 3DS. This includes a more powerful processor than the Nintendo 2DS, an analog pointing stick, additional shoulder buttons, and built-in support for Amiibo use. Unlike the New Nintendo 3DS, the New Nintendo 2DS XL has its microphone and camera on the hinge, with its speakers located on the lower half of the device. It is able to play video games that only it and the New Nintendo 3DS model and its variants are able to play, including Xenoblade Chronicles 3D, Fire Emblem Warriors, and Super Nintendo Entertainment System digital re-releases.

== Design ==
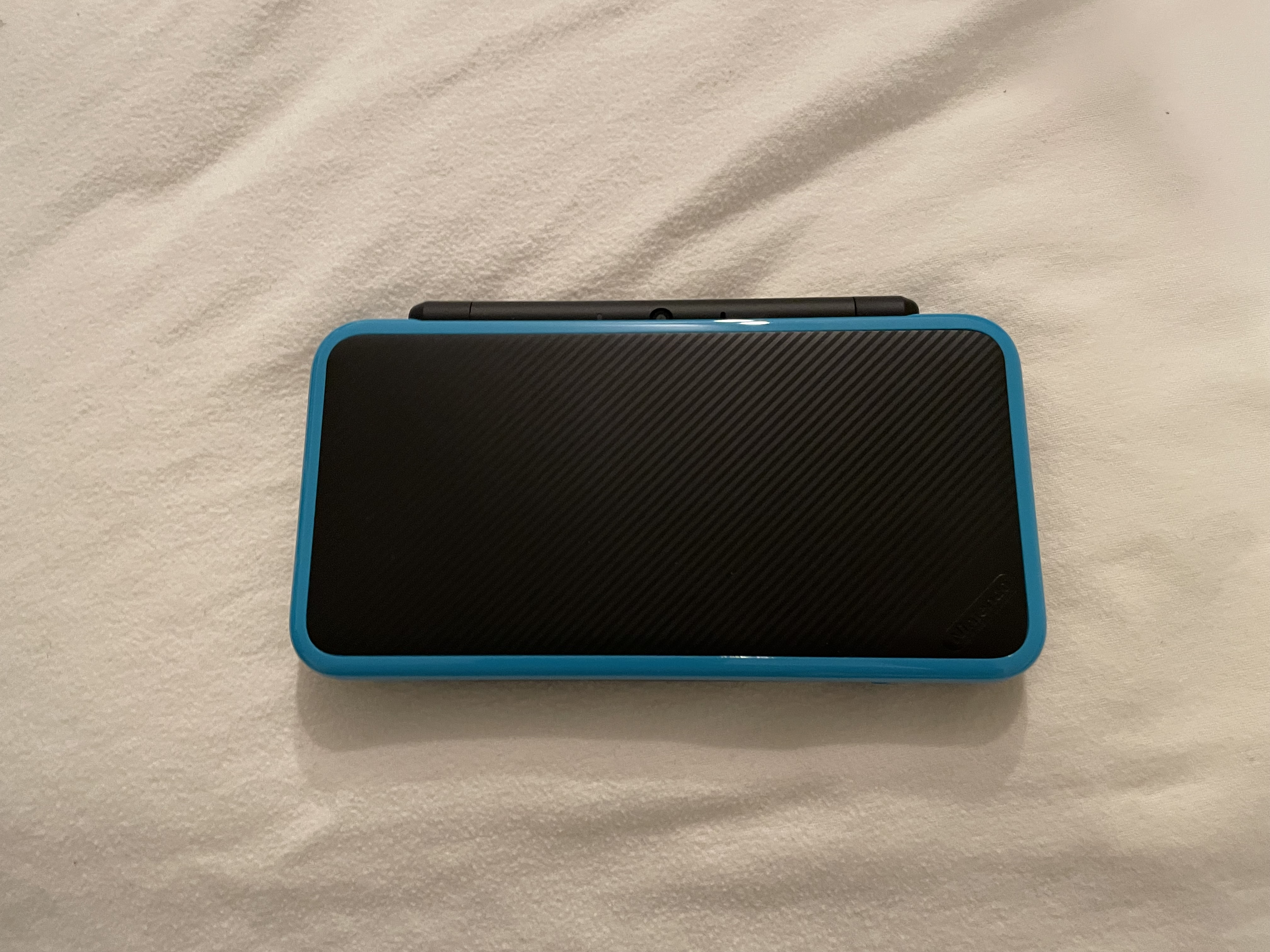
Top of a closed New Nintendo 2DS XL

The New Nintendo 2DS XL has rounded edges on both the top half of the console and the bottom half of the console. There is a corrugated design on the top of all standard edition consoles, with a corner being solid, with the Nintendo logo on it. The accent colour of the console is present on the buttons, the border on the lid, the power button, and the volume control.

To access the microSD card, and the Game Card, there is a dustcover, similar to the SD card slot on past Nintendo 3DS, 2DS, and DSi models, that opens to show both slots. This way of getting to the Game Card on a Nintendo DS system is unique to the New Nintendo 2DS XL. This is more convenient for those who only play digital games, as the Game Card slot is protected by the cover.

On the middle of the bottom half, the side facing the user has a small black oval that houses a 3.5mm headphone jack, and a small stylus that can be taken in and out of the system for safekeeping.

== Software and services ==
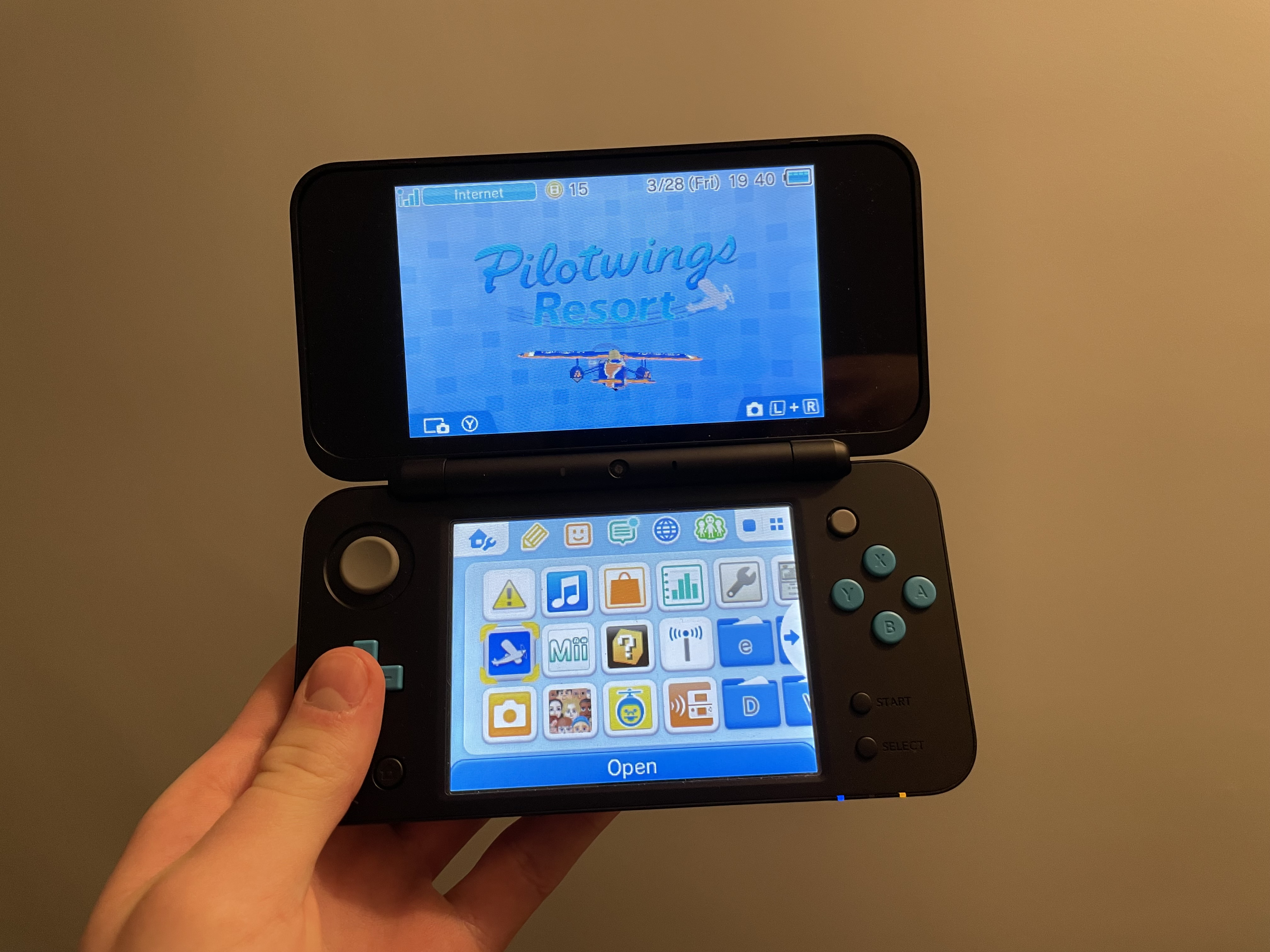
The New Nintendo 2DS XL running firmware version 11.17.0-50U

The system software of the New Nintendo 2DS XL is otherwise identical to that of the New Nintendo 3DS, remaining compatible with all games released for the Nintendo 3DS (in two-dimensional mode only), Nintendo DSi, Nintendo DS, and New Nintendo 3DS (such as Xenoblade Chronicles 3D and Fire Emblem Warriors), and offering online features such as Nintendo Network for multiplayer and online gaming, Nintendo eShop for downloading and purchasing games, DSiWare, and demos, and SpotPass and StreetPass. In some instances, the software may refer to the console as a Nintendo 3DS, due to the software being mostly unchanged.

== Reception ==
IGN considered the New Nintendo 2DS XL to be an improvement over the "ugly doorstop-like" Nintendo 2DS, praising its incorporation of features from the New Nintendo 3DS XL into a device with a thinner and more "comfortable" form factor. Other changes were noted, such as using flaps to protect the game and SD card slots (the latter also removing the need to use tools to access it), and better-feeling shoulder buttons than the New Nintendo 3DS XL. Regressions were also noted, however, such as its screens having a "washed out" appearance and lacking contrast, the top screen having a mirror-like coat that diminished viewing angles, the speakers sounding "muffled", and the short length of the included stylus. The New Nintendo 2DS XL was recommended for users who did not need 3D but still wanted to play the platform's exclusive titles.

TechRadar was similarly positive, but also noting that the hinge now protruded from the back of the device (thus making it look less streamlined when closed), its battery life was "underwhelming", and the timing of its launch was at odds with the release of Nintendo Switch.
