= Amiibo Tap: Nintendo's Greatest Bits =

2015 application

- Developer: Nintendo
- Release: JP: April 23, 2015; WW: April 30, 2015
- Platform: Wii U
- Type: App

Amiibo Tap: Nintendo's Greatest Bits (Note: Known in Japan as Touch! Amiibo: Sudden Famicom Classic Scenes (タッチ！アミーボ：いきなりファミコン名シーン, Tacchi! Amībo: Ikinari Famikon Meishīn).) (stylized as amiibo Tap: Nintendo's Greatest Bits), known as Amiibo Touch & Play: Nintendo Classics Highlights in the PAL regions, is an application developed and published by Nintendo for the Wii U's Nintendo eShop in 2015. The application is used to play demos of 30 popular Nintendo Entertainment System and Super Nintendo Entertainment System video games by scanning Amiibo figurines, Nintendo's toys-to-life series of products.

The player can play demos of the games under a three-minute timer, and starts in various parts of each game. Each Amiibo scan unlocks one title randomly from the collection. The application was teased by Nintendo president Satoru Iwata in February 2015, who later announced the application via Nintendo Direct the following month. It was released in April 2015 in Japan and worldwide. Amiibo Tap: Nintendo's Greatest Bits received mixed reviews, and was criticized for its pricing and structure, especially amidst a supply shortage of Amiibo products. It was made unavailable for download upon the Wii U's eShop closure on March 27, 2023.

== Overview ==
A demo of Super Mario World

Amiibo Tap allows the player to scan an Amiibo figure from any physical series of figures on the Wii U GamePad to unlock demos of 30 video games by Nintendo that were originally released for the Nintendo Entertainment System (NES) and Super Nintendo Entertainment System (SNES). Every unique Amiibo scanned unlocked one game randomly selected from the 30 available. Every time the Amiibo is scanned it starts the player at random points throughout the game, with each unlock having seven to nine of these "scenes". The players can then play as much as they can within three minutes. Also on the screen is a link to a how-to-play screen that explains the controls, and a link to purchase the game's Virtual Console version from the Nintendo eShop.

The list of NES games to unlock are as follows:

- Balloon Fight
- Clu Clu Land
- Donkey Kong
- Donkey Kong Jr.
- Dr. Mario
- Excitebike
- Ice Climber
- Kid Icarus
- Kirby's Adventure
- The Legend of Zelda
- Mach Rider
- Metroid
- Pinball
- Punch-Out!!
- Super Mario Bros.
- Super Mario Bros.: The Lost Levels
- Super Mario Bros. 2
- Super Mario Bros. 3
- Wario's Woods
- Wrecking Crew
- Yoshi
- Zelda II: The Adventure of Link

The list of SNES games to unlock are as follows:

- F-Zero
- Kirby Super Star
- Kirby's Dream Land 3
- Kirby's Dream Course
- The Legend of Zelda: A Link to the Past
- Super Mario Kart
- Super Mario World
- Super Metroid

== Announcement and release ==
The concept of Amiibo Tap was teased by Nintendo president Satoru Iwata in February 2015 during a financial results briefing. The title was officially announced via Nintendo Direct on April 1 the following month, also presented by Iwata. He detailed the time limit and how games are unlocked randomly, comparing the gameplay to "a box of chocolates" in reference to the 1994 film Forrest Gump; it was also slated for a release in spring of that year. The application was released in Japan on April 23, and worldwide on April 30. It was made unavailable for download when the Wii U Nintendo eShop closed on March 27, 2023.

== Reception ==
Prior to release, Hardcore Gamer reviewer Dermot Creggon referred to the title as "the most ingenious implementation of amiibo yet", especially for its utilization of retro Nintendo games. Nintendo Life's Thomas Whitehead also believed the application's concept would be "a clever blend of promoting amiibo, usage of the GamePad and to introduce Wii U owners to classic games".

Upon release, reception was mixed, and was criticized for its pricing and structure. Whitehead was critical what little content that can be unlocked with an individual Amiibo, finding it interesting only to those with many Amiibos, therefore alienating those who only have a few. He also believed it failed to make retro video games appealing to those unfamiliar with them due to limited context and lacking content. In a time where Amiibos were rare to find and expensive due to their scarcity, PCMag reviewer Will Greenwald considered the game not to be worth the hassle of purchasing Amiibo to play. Beyond this, he considered the formula to be an entertaining way to enjoy demos of retro Nintendo games, but buying Amiibo to do so was not worth the price to pay for the content. Critics derided the application for not associating games to their respective Amiibo and instead assigning them randomly. Daan Koopman of Nintendo World Report enjoyed the package for offering a wide variety of experiences, and enjoyed pushing the time restrictions to their limits by speedrunning and trying to get the highest score. Greenwald recommended purchasing the games in full instead of Amiibos via the Virtual Console, while Whitehead recommended the NES Remix series of NES and SNES collections.
