= New Nintendo 3DS =

Handheld game console

New Nintendo 3DS New Nintendo 3DS XL

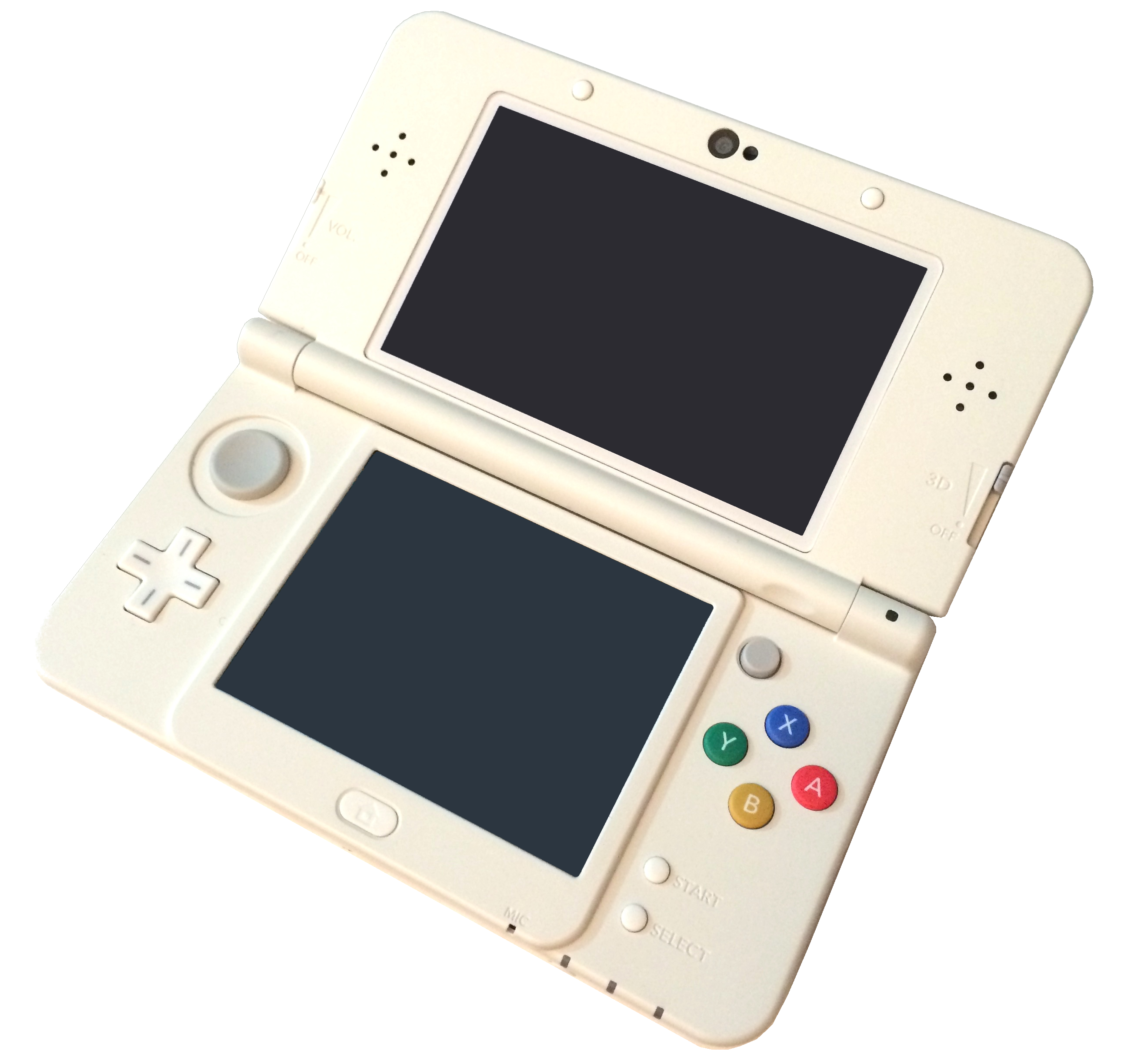
- New Nintendo 3DS in its open position
- Also known as: New Nintendo 3DS XL (LL model, in Japan)
- Developer: Nintendo IRD
- Manufacturer: Nintendo, Foxconn
- Product family: Nintendo 3DS family
- Type: Handheld game console
- Generation: Eighth
- Released: JP: October 11, 2014; AU: November 21, 2014; EU: January 6, 2015; NA: February 13, 2015; KOR: May 1, 2015
- Introductory price: New 3DS: ¥16,000 (equivalent to ¥18,190 in 2024); US$219.99 (equivalent to $300 in 2025); €169.99 (equivalent to €210 in 2023); A$219.95 (equivalent to $260 in 2022); New 3DS XL: ¥18,800 (equivalent to ¥21,380 in 2024); US$199.99 (equivalent to $270 in 2025); €199.99 (equivalent to €250 in 2023); A$219.95 (equivalent to $260 in 2022)
- Discontinued: New 3DS: JP: July 13, 2017; New 3DS XL: WW: July 2019
- Units shipped: 14.74 million (Note: Total: 14.74 million; New 3DS: 2.49 million; New 3DS XL: 12.25 million)
- Media: Physical and digital: Nintendo 3DS Game Card Nintendo DS Game Card Digital distribution (Nintendo eShop) MicroSD card
- Operating system: Nintendo 3DS system software
- CPU: 804 MHz ARM11 MPCore quad-core
- Memory: 256 MB (64 MB dedicated to the OS), 10 MB VRAM
- Storage: 1 GB internal flash memory 4 GB MicroSD included
- Removable storage: MicroSD (Up to 32 GB); Cartridge save
- Display: 2 × LCD screens: New 3DS: Upper: 3.88" autostereoscopic (3D) LCD @ 400 × 240 WQVGA (120.2 ppi) per eye; Lower: 3.33" resistive touchscreen LCD @ 320 × 240 QVGA (120.2 ppi); New 3DS XL: Upper: 4.88" autostereoscopic (3D) LCD @ 400 × 240 WQVGA (95.6 ppi) per eye; Lower: 4.18" resistive touchscreen LCD @ 320 × 240 QVGA (95.6 ppi)
- Graphics: 268 MHz DMP PICA200
- Sound: Stereo speakers, microphone
- Camera: Rear-facing stereoscopic VGA camera, front-facing VGA camera
- Connectivity: Wi-Fi (2.4 GHz 802.11b/g), NFC (FeliCa), infrared
- Power: Lithium-ion battery: New 3DS: 1400 mAh battery; 3DS games: 3.5–6 hours; DS games: 6.5–10.5 hours; Sleep mode: ≈ 3 days; New 3DS XL: 1750 mAh battery; 3DS games: 3.5–7 hours; DS games: 7–12 hours; Sleep mode: ≈ 3 days
- Current firmware: 11.17.0-50, as of May 22, 2023; 3 years ago
- Online services: Nintendo Network: Nintendo eShop (discontinued; users are still able to redownload purchased software and download updates); Miiverse (discontinued); SpotPass (discontinued); Nintendo Zone (discontinued); Flipnote Studio 3D (online services discontinued; offline usage still available); Flipnote Hatena (online services discontinued; offline usage still available)
- Dimensions: Body: New 3DS: Width: 142 mm (5.6 in); Height: 80.6 mm (3.17 in); Depth: 21.6 mm (0.85 in); New 3DS XL: Width: 160 mm (6.3 in); Height: 93.5 mm (3.68 in); Depth: 21.5 mm (0.85 in)
- Weight: New 3DS: 253 g (8.9 oz); New 3DS XL: 329 g (11.6 oz)
- Backward compatibility: Nintendo DS/DSi; Nintendo 3DS
- Predecessor: Nintendo DS/DSi; Nintendo 3DS
- Successor: Nintendo Switch
- Related: Nintendo 3DS; Nintendo 2DS; New Nintendo 2DS XL

The New Nintendo 3DS (Note: Japanese: Newニンテンドー3DS, Hepburn: Nyū Nintendō Surī Dī Esu) is a foldable dual-screen handheld game console developed and marketed by Nintendo. Part of the Nintendo 3DS family, it is a revision of the hardware rather than a full redesign. Improvements over previous models include upgraded processors and increased RAM, an analog pointing stick, two additional shoulder triggers, face detection for optimizing the autostereoscopic 3D display, an included 4 GB microSD card, and built-in NFC, as well as minor design changes (such as colored face buttons and the availability of face plates for the smaller-size model). There were also software improvements, such as support for HTML5 in its web browser.

The console launched in Japan on October 11, 2014, and began a staged international release thereafter, reaching all major markets by September 25, 2015. Like the original 3DS, the New Nintendo 3DS also has a larger variant, the New 3DS XL (released as New Nintendo 3DS LL (Note: Japanese: Newニンテンドー3DS LL, Hepburn: Nyū Nintendō Surī Dī Esu Eru Eru) in Japan)

The New Nintendo 3DS received positive reviews from critics; although some aspects of its design (such as the placement of the microSD slot) were criticized, the system was praised for its improved performance, additional control options, and better 3D image quality. In July 2017, ahead of the release of the New Nintendo 2DS XL, Nintendo confirmed that production of the standard-sized New Nintendo 3DS in Japan had ended. The XL model remained in production until July 2019.

== Hardware ==
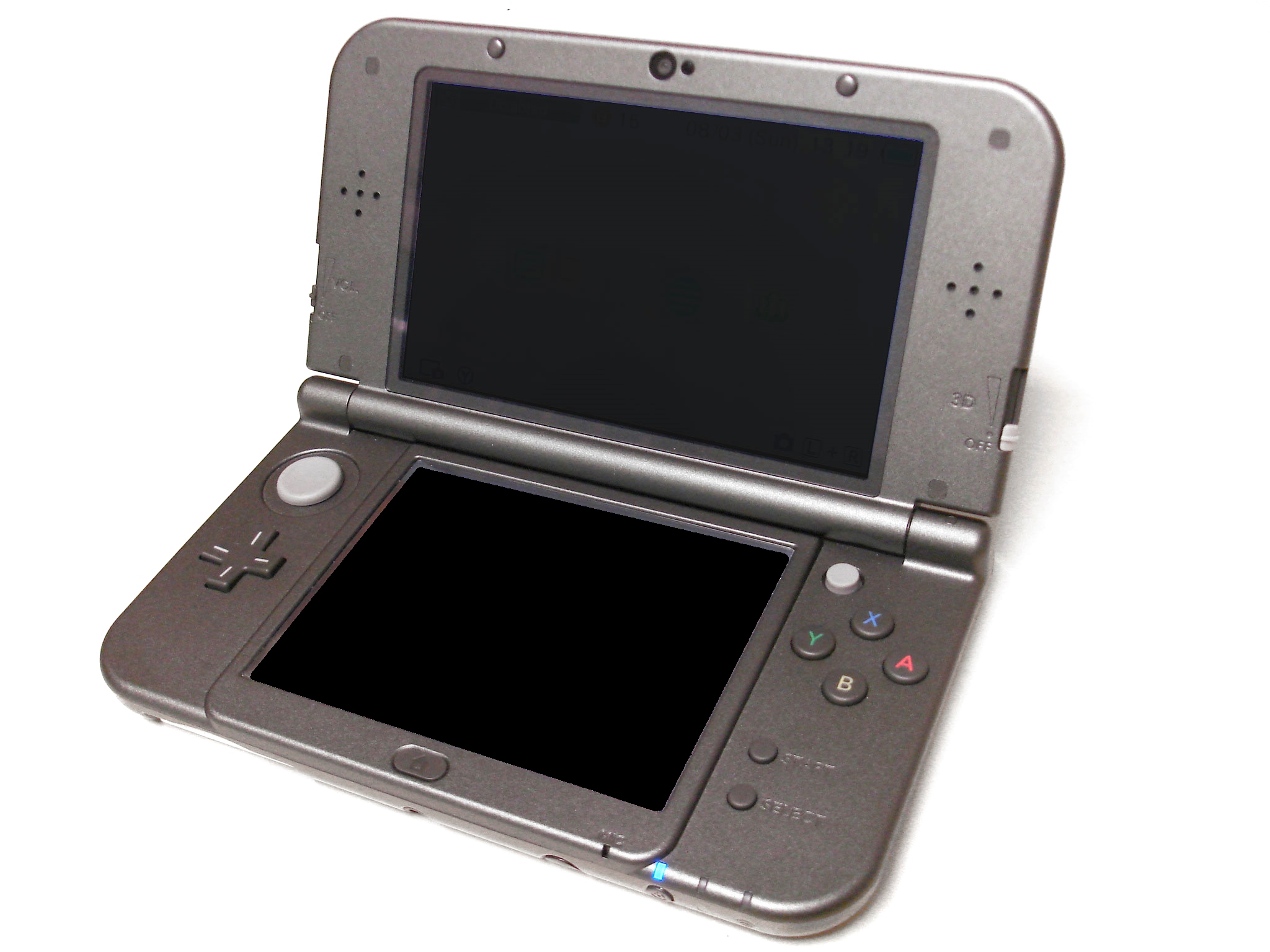
New Nintendo 3DS XL in metallic black

The New Nintendo 3DS family features various changes from prior models. The systems feature a slightly refined design, featuring colored face buttons resembling the Super Famicom's and PAL version Super Nintendo Entertainment System's color scheme. The New Nintendo 3DS's screen is 1.2 times the size of the original Nintendo 3DS, while the screen of the XL variant is the same size as its predecessor. Some units are produced with IPS panels for one or both screens, but most still retain the old twisted nematic panels. There is no known correlation between model number or production date and display type. Nintendo has also not publicly addressed the discrepancies in production.

A new feature known as "Super Stable 3D" improves the quality of the systems' autostereoscopic 3D effects by using a sensor and dedicating one of the new CPU cores to detect the angle that the player is viewing the screen at with face tracking software, then adjusting the 3D effect to compensate. The sensor is also used as an ambient light sensor for automatic brightness adjustment.

Both systems' bodies are slightly larger than their previous iterations, with the XL variant weighing slightly less than the previous 3DS XL. The system's game card slot, stylus holder, and power button were re-located to the base. The hardware wireless switch was also replaced by a software toggle. Similar to the Game Boy Micro, the standard New Nintendo 3DS features interchangeable front and back plates; 38 different designs were available at launch in Japan. The XL variant does not allow use of these plates, instead having a couple of fixed metallic designs.

The internal specifications of the device have also been updated, including additional processor cores, (from 2 cores to four) an increase to 256 MB of RAM, and near-field communication support for use with Amiibo products. The Japanese model also included the ability to pay for software on the Nintendo eShop using prepaid FeliCa-based transit cards such as Suica, which also use NFC technology. Controls on the new systems were expanded with the inclusion of a pointing stick on the right-hand side of the device, referred to as the "C-Stick", and additional ZL and ZR shoulder buttons, allowing for functionality equivalent to the Circle Pad Pro add-on peripheral released for the previous models. These additional buttons are backward-compatible with games programmed for use with the Circle Pad Pro. The predecessors' other inputs remain, including the A/B/X/Y/Start/Select/Home action buttons on the face, L and R shoulder buttons, D-pad, 3D depth slider, volume slider, and power button, along with an accelerometer and a gyroscope.

Unlike the previous models, which used standard SD cards, the New Nintendo 3DS line uses microSD cards for data storage, which are stored alongside the battery behind the device's rear cover, which needs some screws to be removed in order to access the Micro-SD card slot. Data can also be transferred to and from the SD card wirelessly using any system with SMB client access, like PCs.

The new systems continue to use the same AC adapter as the DSi, DSi XL, and other devices in the 3DS family; like the Nintendo 3DS XL in Japan and Europe, and in North America, an AC adapter is not included with the console and must be obtained separately.

== Software and services ==
Aside from minor adjustments to reflect its hardware design differences, the system software of the New Nintendo 3DS is otherwise identical to that of the original 3DS, offering online features such as Nintendo Network for multiplayer and online gaming, Nintendo eShop for downloading and purchasing games, and StreetPass and SpotPass. The web browser was updated to include HTML5-based video playback support. On Japanese models, a content filter is active by default which can be disabled with the registration of a credit card, intended to prevent children from visiting mature websites.

=== Compatibility ===
As with the DSi, DSi XL, and previous 3DS models, the New Nintendo 3DS family remains compatible with all games released for the DS, DSi, and 3DS. To allow the playing of games not optimized for the New 3DS's faster CPU cores, a small comparability layer in software assigns different threads to different cores of the processor as to not stall the CPU. Some 3DS games have improved performance and/or graphics on the new systems due to their upgraded hardware. The C-Stick and ZL/ZR controls are backward compatible with games that support the Circle Pad Pro add-on. Some games, such as Xenoblade Chronicles 3D, are specifically optimized for the upgraded hardware, and exclusive to New Nintendo 3DS with no support for prior models. In March 2016, Nintendo began to release SNES titles on Virtual Console for New 3DS; they support a "Perfect Pixel" mode, which allows the games to be played pillar boxed with square pixels rather than in their original 4:3 proportions.

Like the previous models, all the 3DS games and downloaded software are region-locked (DS cartridges remain region-free). Due to its difference in size, peripherals designed to fit the shape of the original Nintendo 3DS cannot be used with the new system. Game data can be transferred from a previous 3DS system to a new system, either manually or wireless.

On April 13, 2015, Unity Technologies announced that the Unity engine would support the New Nintendo 3DS.

List of physical releases exclusive to New Nintendo 3DS
Title	Developer(s)	Publisher	Release date				Ref.
Title	Developer(s)	Publisher	Japan	North America	Australasia	Europe	Ref.
Fire Emblem Warriors	Omega Force, Team Ninja, Intelligent Systems	Nintendo	September 28, 2017	October 20, 2017	October 20, 2017	October 20, 2017	
Minecraft: New Nintendo 3DS Edition	Other Ocean Interactive	Mojang	September 14, 2017	September 13, 2017	September 20, 2018 (digital only)	September 20, 2018 (digital only)	
Runbow Pocket	13AM Games	13AM Games	Unreleased	June 20, 2017	Unreleased	June 20, 2017	
Xenoblade Chronicles 3D	Monolith Soft	Nintendo	April 2, 2015	April 10, 2015	April 2, 2015	April 2, 2015	

== Release ==
The New Nintendo 3DS was first announced during a Japanese Nintendo Direct presentation streamed on August 29, 2014. The New Nintendo 3DS and 3DS XL (known in Japan as the New Nintendo 3DS LL) were released in Japan on October 11, 2014; the regular-sized version was made available in black and white-colored versions, while the XL was made available in metallic black and metallic blue versions, with additional limited edition designs. Over 38 different face plate designs were available on launch in Japan, which were showcased in a pre-launch television commercial that featured J-pop performer Kyary Pamyu Pamyu. 230,000 units were sold in its first two days of availability.

The New Nintendo 3DS and its XL variant were first released outside Japan—in Australia and New Zealand, on November 21, 2014, with the smaller model only available in white. In Europe, the New Nintendo 3DS was first made available online on January 6, 2015, in a special white "Ambassador Edition" bundle, exclusive to Club Nintendo members, with a charging dock and two face plates included.

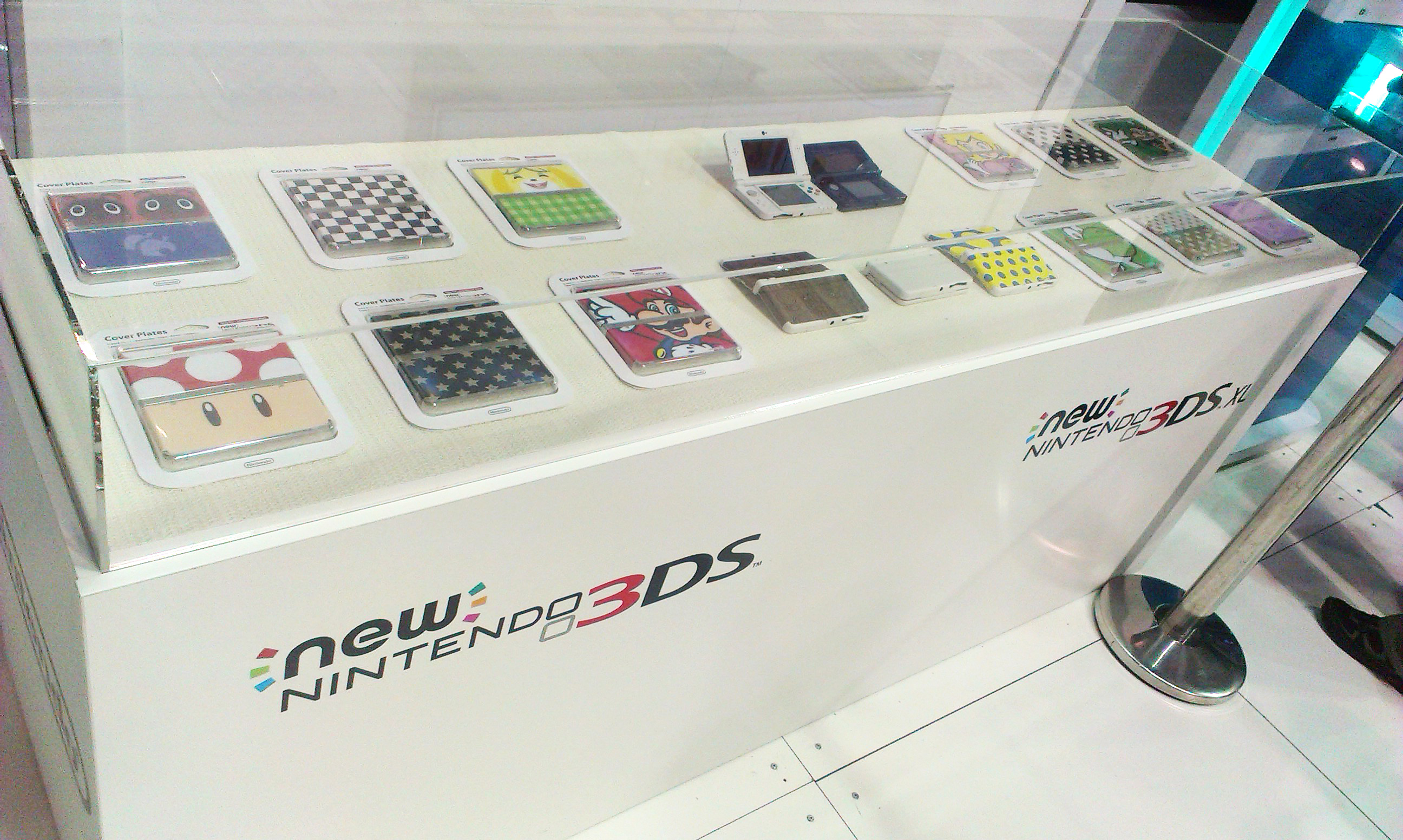
Display case featuring the New Nintendo 3DS and face plates at PAX Australia 2014

On January 14, 2015, Nintendo announced that the new systems would be released at retail in North America and Europe on February 13, 2015. In Europe, the New Nintendo 3DS was available in black or white, and its XL variant in Metallic Black or Metallic Blue. In North America, the XL model was released in Metallic Black and Metallic Red (renamed "New Black" and "New Red"). Special The Legend of Zelda: Majora's Mask 3D and Monster Hunter 4 Ultimate-themed variants were also released at launch in both regions. 335,000 units were sold during its first week of availability in Europe and North America.

Only the XL model was originally released in North America; although Nintendo did not rule out the possibility of a release of the regular New Nintendo 3DS in the future, Nintendo of America representative Damon Baker explained that they did not want to confuse consumers, and that the face plates were not enough of a reason for the smaller-sized system to be released in North America. A social media campaign emerged that called upon Nintendo of America to release the model in North America.

On August 31, 2015, at the GameStop Managers Conference in Las Vegas, Nintendo of America confirmed that the standard New 3DS system would launch in the region on September 25, 2015, with an Animal Crossing: Happy Home Designer-themed bundle including the console, game software, two faceplates, and an Amiibo card. The bundle was priced at $219.99. A second The Legend of Zelda-themed XL bundle, the "Hyrule Edition", was also announced as a GameStop exclusive for release on October 30, 2015. It was priced at $199.99.

In January 2016, a special Pokémon-themed New Nintendo 3DS bundle was announced for release in North America on February 27, 2016, to coincide with the 20th anniversary Virtual Console release of the original Pokémon games. The model is bundled with both Pokémon Red and Pokémon Blue, Charizard and Blastoise-themed faceplates, and a downloadable HOME Menu theme.

In August 2016, a Super Mario 3D Land New 3DS bundle with two faceplates was released in North America as an exclusive to Target and Walmart. Nintendo released black- and white-colored New 3DS models with Mario-themed designs in North America in November 2016; for Black Friday, the two models were sold at US$99.99—a price only $20 higher than that of the 2DS.

In July 2017, Nintendo confirmed, in the lead-up to the release of the New Nintendo 2DS XL, that production on the standard-sized New Nintendo 3DS in Japan had ended. The XL model had halted production in July 2019.

== Reception ==
Reviews of the New Nintendo 3DS line were positive. Critics felt the new "Super-Stable 3D" system was successful in improving the consistency and viewing angles of the device's stereoscopic 3D effects, especially in games that require use of its gyroscope. An IGN writer noted that "the constant swaying and occasional jolt of my morning train commute has only very occasionally shattered the new systems' stereoscopic spell, and even then, the system quickly adjusts and snaps back into focus". The improved technical specifications of the new systems were also noted, making the device's operating system more responsive and providing modest performance enhancements for existing games such as Monster Hunter 4 Ultimate.

The incorporation of the Circle Pad Pro's additional shoulder buttons and secondary analog stick into the devices were praised, along with their potential for use in ports of games from home consoles. Opinions were mixed on the design of the C-Stick itself, however; GameSpot felt it was "surprisingly responsive" and IGN drew comparisons to the similar pointing stick sometimes found on ThinkPad laptops, but felt that while good for occasional functions (such as camera control and aiming in third-person games), it would not function well for more intense use cases (such as first-person shooters) due to its size and lack of grip in comparison to the Circle Pad.

IGN felt that the face plate options on the regular-sized models added a level of personalization to the console, but that "[while] face plates will take off with younger gamers in particular, these accessories could just as easily end up in the bargain bin faster than you can say Limited Edition Perfect Dark Zero Xbox 360 face plate." Nintendo's decision to exclude this feature from the XL version was also considered odd. Wired felt that the new locations for the power button, card slot, and stylus holder were "inconvenient". Critics also felt the switch to MicroSD cards and the relocation of the SD card slot to the battery compartment would make manually transferring data from the previous 3DS models trickier; GameSpot lamented on the difficulty of unscrewing the rear cover off the XL, citing "stubborn screws and a panel that practically refuses to detach". Nintendo's decision to not bundle an AC adapter with the new models was criticized, particularly in the case of first-time 3DS owners.

GameSpot felt that the New Nintendo 3DS XL was "the best handheld Nintendo's ever made", and recommended it to first-time 3DS owners. In regards to existing 3DS owners, the new systems were recommended to those showing interest in its exclusives or wanting a better overall experience. Giving the console a score of 8.8 out of 10, IGN concluded that "the additional controls and increased processing power set the system up nicely for the future, and if you're late to the 3DS party, you've got a back catalogue that features not just some of the best handheld games in recent years, but some of the best games full stop."

=== Sales ===
As of December 31, 2016, 9.94 million units of the New Nintendo 3DS and New Nintendo 3DS XL have shipped worldwide.

== See also ==
- Nintendo 3DS
- Nintendo 2DS
- New Nintendo 2DS XL
