= Kékéflipnote =

French animator and artist

- Born: Kévin Gemin; April 14, 1992 (age 34); Annemasse, Haute-Savoie
- Education: Émile Cohl School, Lyon
- Occupations: Artist; animator
- Years active: 2013–present

Kévin Gemin (French pronunciation: [kevin ʒəmin]; born April 14, 1992), known online as Kékéflipnote or simply Kéké, is a French artist and animator. He is best known for his work created using the Flipnote Studio line of software for the Nintendo DSi and Nintendo 3DS handheld game consoles.

== Early life and education ==
Gemin was born in Annemasse, Haute-Savoie, France. He enrolled at the Émile Cohl School in Lyon in 2013, graduating with a degree in animation in 2016.

== Career ==
Gemin initially discovered Flipnote Studio in September 2009 after having animated via traditional means for a period of time and was inspired by 1930s cartoons, specifically the work of Tex Avery.

Two of his works include a Steven Universe parody entitled Steven Pigeon Universe and an animation featuring anthropomorphic pigeons (resembling kiwis) dancing the can-can.

Gemin was the Guest of Honour at NordicFuzzCon in 2019. In May 2018, he spoke at the 14th annual Pictoplasma Conference and Festival for character design and art in Berlin.

Gemin's animation was featured in the ending of an episode of Pop Team Epic.
