= Pop Island Paperfield =

2010 video game

- Developer: ODENIS Studio
- Publisher: ODENIS Studio
- Designer: Olivier Denis
- Composer: Raphaël Gesqua
- Platform: Nintendo DSi (DSiWare)
- Release: NA: July 15, 2010; EU: July 23, 2010
- Genre: Action
- Modes: Single-player, multiplayer

Pop Island – Paperfield is a Nintendo DSi video game by French developer ODENIS Studio. It is the sequel to Pop Island. When the game was still available for purchase, it cost 200 Nintendo points, and could be downloaded at the DSi Shop. Pop Island – Paperfield is a capture the flag type game. The player's objective is to bring as many flags to their base as possible in a set amount of time, while trying to stop the opposing team from bringing flags to their base. The characters of Pop Island consist of 12 different animals and vehicles, such as a lion with wheels, surfing penguin, a fish, a skateboarding elephant and many others.

== Gameplay ==
Like the previous game, Paperfield is presented from a third-person perspective. Using the Nintendo DSi's D-pad, the player moves around their character to capture flags and return them to their base. The player may shoot firecrackers at opponents in an attempt to pop them away from the player. If the player is hit by a firecracker, the player drops their flag (if the player is holding one) and is popped from where they were.

Players can choose between 3 main types of characters: wheeled, fish, and flying. Wheeled characters move quickly on land, but slowly in water. Fish swim quickly in water but move slowly on land. Flying characters move at moderate speeds above land or water. The game offers local multiplayer for up to eight players via DS Download Play.

Paperfield offers additional content for those who bought the previous title, as owners of both games can unlock three new maps and four vehicles, including a helicopter and a submarine. The original Pop Island contains 8 levels and 12 characters, while Paperfield consists of 3 levels and 8 characters. Some of the characters are in both games, while others are only available in their respective installments.

== Reception ==
Reception

Aggregate score
Aggregator	Score
Metacritic	81/100

Review scores
Publication	Score
IGN	8/10
Nintendo Life	7/10
Nintendo World Report	9/10

Despite not featuring any major changes over its predecessor, the game received a higher average critic-rating of 81%, according to Metacritic. Wiiloveit.com gave the game a 28/30, considering it to be a "must-download" with an "almost unbelievable" cost.
