= Flipnote Studio 3D =

Nintendo 3DS animation application

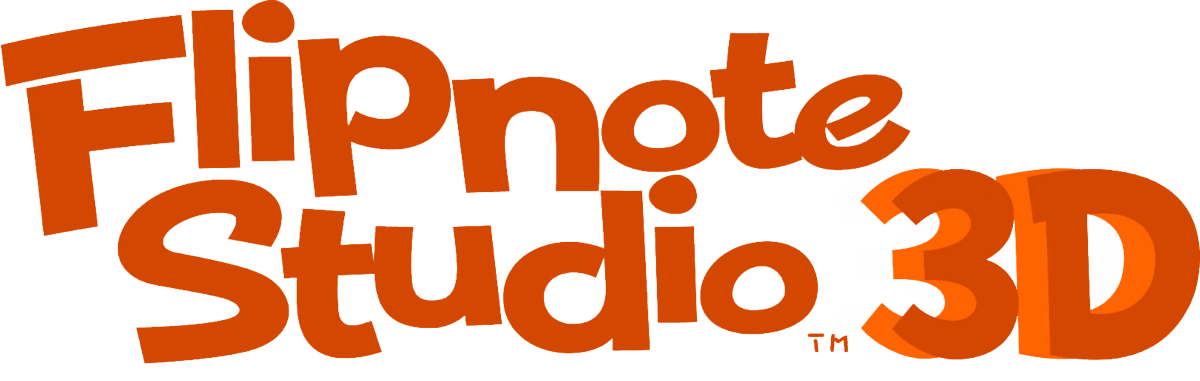
- Developer: Nintendo EAD Tokyo
- Publisher: Nintendo
- Directors: Hideaki Shimizu; Yasuhiko Matsuzaki
- Producer: Yoshiaki Koizumi
- Programmer: Hideaki Shimizu
- Artist: Yasuhiko Matsuzaki
- Platform: Nintendo 3DS family
- Release: JP: July 24, 2013; NA: February 10, 2015; PAL: March 31, 2016
- Genre: Animation
- Modes: Single player, online

Flipnote Studio 3D, known in Japan as Moving Notepad 3D (うごくメモ帳 3D, Ugoku Memochō Surī Dī) and originally announced as the working title/codename, Flipnote Memo, is a 2D animation application developed by Nintendo EAD Tokyo and released in 2013 for the Nintendo 3DS as a successor to Flipnote Studio and Flipnote Hatena.

A successor to the original Flipnote Studio, Flipnote Studio 3D allows users to use three separate layers to create stereoscopic 3D animations, which can be exported into GIF or AVI format. Flipnote Studio 3D initially launched with two online communities: Flipnote Gallery: Friends and Flipnote Gallery: World. Both services have ceased operation.

The application was available as a free download, originally released in Japan on July 24, 2013. It was set for an August 2013 release in North America and Europe, but due to "unexpectedly high" usage of the online services in Japan, the application's release was delayed for both regions. It was eventually released in North America for Club Nintendo members on February 10, 2015; in Europe and Australia, however, those who pre-registered or signed up for a Nintendo Account between March 31 and April 30, 2016, were able to redeem the app free via My Nintendo. It was again put on My Nintendo on December 1, 2016, for the Americas region and on January 1, 2017, for the PAL region, and remained available until 2023. Flipnote Gallery: World service was discontinued in Japan on April 2, 2018, while ticket sales ended on October 2, 2017.

The app was removed from download on March 27, 2023, due to the closure of Nintendo eShop services for the Nintendo 3DS. However, players who downloaded the title before this date can still run it as long as it is on their 3DS device.

== Features ==
=== Flipnote creation ===
The main screen of the Flipnote creation interface

Largely similar to its predecessor, Flipnote Studio 3D allows users to create short animated sketches known as Flipnotes. Flipnotes can be made up of hundreds of frames, and can be played back at a variety of speeds. The software offers users the option to create 3D Flipnotes by drawing different parts of the animation on up to three layers. The main tools include a pen, an eraser, and a paintbrush. New to Flipnote Studio 3D are tools that draw shapes, fill enclosed areas (paint bucket), and insert text. The application features a limited color palette, including black, white, red, blue, green, and yellow. This is a slight improvement upon Flipnote Studio, which did not include yellow and green as selectable colors, but were still possible using color mixing. The selection tool is used to copy and manipulate parts of a frame. Users can also use the 3DS system's camera and microphone to add audio and photos to their creations. These animations can be shared by exporting them as GIF or AVI files.

=== Online services ===
Flipnote Studio 3D was launched along with two separate online services: Flipnote Gallery: Friends and Flipnote Gallery: World. As the names imply, the former allows for Flipnotes to be shared with people on the user's 3DS Friends List, and the latter is a worldwide community for sharing and viewing Flipnotes. Flipnote Gallery: Friends was a SpotPass service included as a part of Flipnote Studio 3D. The service allowed users to share Flipnotes with up to 20 people in their 3DS Friends List via temporary galleries. In addition, Flipnote Gallery: Friends featured a simple voting system. On November 1, 2013, Nintendo ended the Flipnote Gallery: Friends service in Japan, due to concerns that users, including minors, could exchange Friend Codes on internet forums and use them to send inappropriate content. Later, the Flipnote Gallery: Friends feature was removed completely from the application via an update.

Flipnote Gallery: World's "Most Popular" page.

Flipnote Gallery: World was a paid community service, and the successor to Flipnote Hatena. The service was based around 30-day "passes" that could be obtained in a variety of ways. There was also a window of time from between 3 pm to 7 pm when anyone could connect to the service free, based on the console's system time. Users received one pass when they first connected to Flipnote Gallery: World as a free trial to the service, with additional passes being purchased for a small fee of ¥100. Each pass, activated when the previous pass expires, granted users 100 Coins and 3 Star Coins which were required for various activities.

A coin was required to perform most activities on Flipnote Gallery: World, including posting a comment or downloading a Flipnote. They were also used to rate Flipnotes. They also were required for posting Flipnotes. Users could add as many coins as they wanted, based on how much they liked the Flipnote. Users were given a very limited quantity of Star Coins. These were required to add another Creator to a user's Favorites, and could also be added to others' Flipnotes. Flipnotes could be posted using either a regular Coin or a Star Coin. If Flipnotes posted using a regular Coin did not receive any Coins within 30 days, they would be automatically removed from the service. On the other hand, Flipnotes posted using Star Coins would remain on the Gallery indefinitely regardless of whether they received any Coins. There was also a section of Flipnote Gallery: World called Nintendo DSi Gallery, wherein Flipnotes transferred from Flipnote Hatena could be viewed and downloaded. This gallery was free to access. Users could participate in the Flipnote Gallery: World community as either a "Creator" or a "Collector." Creators made Flipnotes and posted them to the gallery, while the role of Collectors was to find high-quality Flipnotes and help them become popular. Doing particularly well in either activity provided an opportunity for users to be granted a free 30-day pass to the service.

The Club Nintendo/My Nintendo version of Flipnote Studio 3D limits the sharing of Flipnotes to local wireless between 3DS systems, though users may still export their creations to SD cards and download Flipnotes from the DSi version.

Nintendo announced that Flipnote Studio 3D’s Flipnote Gallery: World online service in Japan would officially end on April 2, 2018 at 10am Tokyo Time. There have been two phases in the closure of the service. The first phase was the end of ticket sales which were required to use the service. Ticket sales ended on October 2, 2017 at 10:00 AM Tokyo time, then Flipnote Gallery: World closed its doors on April 2, 2018 at 10:00 AM Tokyo time.

Nintendo also added once ticket sales officially end, the “free time” duration for users to access the service would be extended and that the number of coins given the users daily would be increased. It is unclear whether the DSi Library on Flipnote Studio 3D, which hosts Flipnotes from Flipnote Hatena (an online service for Flipnote Studio on Nintendo DSi), will be impacted in the west. Due to closure of Flipnote Gallery: World. the DSi Library was shut down.

A community-developed Flipnote Gallery: World service was created from the Nintendo DSi Library feature of European and American versions of Flipnote Studio 3D named Kaeru Gallery (formerly Project Kaeru and kaeru:world). However, this service is only able to be accessed with a modified Nintendo 3DS.

=== KWZ file format ===
KWZ
- Filename extension: .kwz
- Internet media type: application/octet-stream image/x-3ds-kwz
- Developed by: Nintendo
- Type of format: Container format
- Extended from: PPM

KWZ is a proprietary video file format created by Nintendo, used to store Flipnote Studio 3D animations. The format consists of metadata including the author's name and creation time, animation frame bitmaps utilizing lossless block-based I-frame and P-frame video compression, and audio tracks encoded using a custom variable bitrate ADPCM variant. KWZ files are viewable in fanmade applications such as Flipnote Player.

== Development ==
Flipnote Studio 3D was originally announced by Shigeru Miyamoto in April 2011 under the name Flipnote Memo. Other than this mention, there was no further news on the eventual release of the application until a Nintendo Direct Mini broadcast in March 2013. In this official announcement, several features were revealed, such as the ability to create 3D Flipnotes using up to three layers. This was the first time that the application was referred to as Flipnote Studio 3D. The broadcast also announced a release date of mid-2013.

Flipnote Studio 3D was released in Japan on July 24, 2013. Originally, the application was to be released in Europe on August 1, but on July 30, Nintendo of Europe tweeted that, due to the unexpectedly high use of the online services in Japan, the application's release would be delayed. They also promised to announce a new release date "as soon as possible". Nintendo of America's official website for the application originally indicated an "Early August 2013" release date, but on August 7, this release date was changed to "TBD" without any accompanying notice of a delay.

On November 1, 2013, the Flipnote Gallery: Friends service was discontinued in Japan due to the possibility of underage users sending/receiving "inappropriate content" via the service. Simultaneously, Nintendo globally disabled SpotPass features for their messaging app Swapnote/Nintendo Letter Box for similar reasons. After 16 months without any announcement, on November 21, 2014, Nintendo removed all mention about Flipnote Studio and Flipnote Studio 3D in the English translation for a Japanese interview about Pikmin Short Movies in Miiverse.

In 2015, North American members of Club Nintendo, which was due to close later in the year, were able to download Flipnote Studio 3D free between February and June. This version limited sharing of Flipnotes to local wireless, though users were able to download Flipnotes from the DSi version's gallery and transfer creations to an SD card. It was released on February 10.

On March 31, 2016, Flipnote Studio 3D became available again for North America and for the first time in Europe, Australia, as well as Mexico and Brazil, via the My Nintendo loyalty program. It was available from March 31 until April 30, and was free to redeem. Although the PAL version initially featured buttons that supposedly access Flipnote Gallery: Friends/World communities, they were not functional, and this version was restricted to the similar functions as the North American version. The buttons were later removed via an update.

On December 1, 2016, Flipnote Studio 3D became available again for the Americas alongside the release of the My Nintendo website revamp and the introduction of child accounts in all regions. Unlike previous offers, the app was available indefinitely without an expiration date, although it required members to spend 200 Platinum Points to redeem it. With the introduction of child account support, users under 13 years could acquire Flipnote Studio 3D, as this was not previously possible on either Club Nintendo or My Nintendo at launch before the revamp. Flipnote Studio 3D became available again for Europe and Australia as of January 1, 2017.

On April 2, 2018, the remaining online service, Flipnote Gallery: World, ceased operations.

== Reception ==
Flipnote Studio 3D has received mostly positive feedback since its release in Japan. A Nintendo World Report editorial stated that the now-removed Flipnote Gallery: Friends feature was not very well put together. However, it also praised Flipnote Gallery: World and the wealth of other sharing options available. Despite the current lack of SpotPass features, the editorial expressed that Flipnote Studio 3D is still a lot of fun, and Nintendo should still release the then-delayed application in the West. The stripped-down international version of Flipnote Studio 3D was received with mixed reactions.

== See also ==
- Colors! 3D
- Flip book
- Nintendo Network
