= Pop Island =

2009 video game

- Developer: ODENIS Studio
- Publisher: ODENIS Studio
- Composer: Raphaël Gesqua
- Platform: Nintendo DSi (DSiWare)
- Release: NA: December 7, 2009; EU: March 12, 2010
- Genre: Action
- Modes: Single-player, multiplayer

Pop Island is a Nintendo DSi video game by French developer ODENIS Studio. When the game was still available for purchase, it cost 200 Nintendo points, and could be downloaded at the DSi Shop. Pop Island is a capture the flag type game. The player's objective is to bring as many flags to their base as possible in a set amount of time, while trying to stop the opposing team from bringing flags to their base. The characters of Pop Island consist of 12 different animals such as a lion with wheels, surfing penguin, a fish, a skateboarding elephant and many others. A sequel, Pop Island – Paperfield, released in July 2010.

== Gameplay ==
The game is presented from a third-person perspective. Using the Nintendo DSi's D-pad or by touching the bottom screen with the Stylus the player moves their character to capture flags and return them to their base. The player may shoot firecrackers at opponents in an attempt to pop them away from the player. If the player is hit by a firecracker, the player drops their flag (if the player is holding one) and is popped from where they were.

Players can choose between 3 main types of characters: wheeled, fish, and flying. Wheeled characters move quickly on land, but slowly in water. Fish swim quickly in water but move slowly on land. Flying characters move at moderate speeds above land or water. The game offers local multiplayer for up to eight players via DS Download Play.

== Reception ==
Reception

Aggregate score
| Aggregator | Score |
|---|---|
| Metacritic | 77/100 |

Review scores
| Publication | Score |
|---|---|
| IGN | 7.5/10 |
| Nintendo Life | 8/10 |
| Pocket Gamer | 4/5 |

Pop Island received generally positive reviews from critics. CheatCC gave the game a 4/5, praising the game's "sweet presentation," "poppy tunes," and "madcap action."

== Related games ==
- A direct sequel titled Pop Island – Paperfield was released via DSiWare in July 2010.
- A spin-off game featuring Pop Island's characters and environments, titled Rising Board 3D, was released for the Nintendo 3DS in 2012.
- Pop Island - Let's Code, a coding Software Development Kit, released on Steam in 2018.
