= Ping Pals =

2004 video game

- European packaging artwork
- Developer: WayForward Technologies
- Publisher: THQ
- Producer: Derek Dutilly
- Designer: Matt Bozon
- Programmer: Ian Wakelin
- Artist: Matt Bozon
- Writer: Paula Shumard
- Composers: Shin'en Multimedia (Manfred Linzner, Martin Schioeler)
- Platform: Nintendo DS
- Release: NA: December 7, 2004; AU: February 24, 2005; EU: March 11, 2005
- Genre: Simulation
- Modes: Single-player, multiplayer

Ping Pals is a chat/accessory program developed by WayForward Technologies and published by THQ for the Nintendo DS. It was released on December 8, 2004, in North America & It was released in Europe in early 2005. The program allows the user to customise their "Ping Pal" avatar and game interface by selecting from over 1000 different items such as hairstyles, makeup, clothing, backdrops, music loops and sound effects.

== Gameplay ==
Items can be unlocked by trading with other players or buying them in a shop. Players must trade to complete their collections, as each cartridge's shop offers a different subset of the items. Players receive a regular allowance of coins, using the DS' date-keeping functionality, and can get more by playing mini-games (such as Guess the Number and Hot Potato), typing certain secret words in chat (each word works once per file) and even for choosing to display the credits screen more than once.

Up to 16 players can connect wirelessly using one game cartridge; each must be within about 100 feet (30 m) of one of the others to exchange text and picture messages.

== Reception ==
Reception

Aggregate score
Aggregator	Score
Metacritic	28/100

Review scores
Publication	Score
1Up.com	F
Electronic Gaming Monthly	0.5/10
GameSpot	3.3/10
GameSpy	1/5
GameZone	3/10
IGN	3.5/10
Nintendo Power	2.8/5
Nintendo World Report	5/10
Official Nintendo Magazine	9%
PALGN	2/10

Although Ping Pals was marketed as a nonviolent, girl-friendly game, it was frequently criticized as not being interactive enough to be called a game. In addition to this, the DS has a built-in chat program called PictoChat. PictoChat includes features that Ping Pals lacks, and due to this, the game received "generally unfavorable reviews" according to the review aggregation website Metacritic. For instance, Nintendo Official Magazine, in its Nintendo DS special, opened their review of the game by describing its existence as being "a bit like paying money to breathe air." By contrast with other summaries in the magazine, which were typed and more detailed, the reviewer gave a one word summary, handwritten in PictoChat, reading "POINTLESS".

Several images in Ping Pals were licensed from QPlay. These include the Cupimon, a green creature that dances in the startup animation, and several avatar and clothing graphics.

The game received two zeroes and one 1.5 from Electronic Gaming Monthly, the lowest average score in the history of the publication.

== See also ==
- PictoChat
