= PictoChat =

Nintendo DS messaging software

- Developer: Nintendo
- Type: LAN messenger
- Launched: NA: November 21, 2004; JP: December 2, 2004; AU: February 24, 2005; EU: March 11, 2005; ESP: May 17, 2005
- Last updated: March 22, 2012 (details)
- Platforms: Nintendo DS; Nintendo DS Lite; Nintendo DSi; Nintendo DSi XL
- Status: Active
- Members: 1

PictoChat (ピクトチャット, PikutoChatto) is a LAN messenger service developed by Nintendo. It is preloaded on the Nintendo DS, Nintendo DS Lite and Nintendo DSi. Up to sixteen people can paint and/or text chat with each other using it, connected wirelessly through a LAN-only, system-to-system wireless connection. It allows for simple input of keyboard text and written text/drawings. PictoChat received an Excellence Prize for Entertainment at the 2004 Japan Media Arts Festival.

== Functions ==
Interface

The Nintendo DS touch screen is used to type in letters with an on-screen keyboard or to draw and send pictures. Text can also be manually placed on the screen, if the user drags the selected character onto the message area. Messages sent from the DS or DS Lite appear in black, while DSi systems feature an additional "rainbow" pen. The pen tool offers small and large sizes. The keyboard provides enough Latin and kana glyphs to write in all languages supported by the system: English, German, French, Spanish, Italian, and Japanese, plus Hungarian, Finnish, Portuguese and Dutch. The PictoChat system can only send messages in a radius of 10 metres (33 ft).

PictoChat displays the name and message managed in System Settings to all the users in the same chat room.

Four chat rooms (A, B, C & D) are available at one time, each with a capacity of sixteen people, for a maximum of sixty-four people in total of all the chat rooms.

On the DSi version of PictoChat, a rainbow pen can be used by tapping on the pen icon again once it has been selected. Content created using the rainbow pen can be read by PictoChat users on Nintendo DS Lite and original Nintendo DS systems. Additionally, there is special sound when receiving a message written by a DSi user. The console plays a special sound and displays a special message when a user joins on their birthday.

=== Flip book creation ===
Flip books can be created for PictoChat by drawing a picture, sending it, copying it, modifying it slightly, and repeating the process. By pressing the R button, the user can return to the first image, then scroll through the images by pressing L+R to animate them. In 2009, this functionality was expanded into Flipnote Studio for the DSi, a free standalone animation program that allowed users to use a variety of brushes, animate on layers, and save and share the animations both as GIF images and via an online gallery. A successor, Flipnote Studio 3D, was later released for 3DS.

=== Kanji Sonomama Rakubiki Jiten ===
The Nintendo DS kanji-English-Japanese dictionary Kanji Sonomama Rakubiki Jiten DS (漢字そのままＤＳ楽引辞典; lit. "Kanji DS Advanced Dictionary") contains an extension to PictoChat that allows users to input kanji characters in addition to the standard character set. This version of PictoChat also vocalized roman characters and kana when they are input. This software is exclusive to Japan, and is the only type of PictoChat that can be used on Nintendo 3DS consoles without custom firmware.

== Reception ==
After seeing PictoChat at E3 2004, Ricardo Torres of GameSpot called it "one of the most interesting pieces of software on display" for the system, though calling its interface "bare bones". Ty Shugart of Nintendo World Report expressed the view that it was "a great tool for getting a feel for the DS", but hoped it would be included with the system, calling it not worth buying for more than a couple of dollars. In another preview, Craig Harris of IGN called the software "more for fun than functionality", and "made for people in a classroom, or a plane", noting that "it has its own charms". Rob Fahey of Eurogamer called PictoChat "a hit around these parts" when writing an overview of the DS's functions, noting that it worked extremely well even with a poor wireless signal.

Hyper magazine called PictoChat "the highlight of the launch package", describing it as "riotously good fun", and saying that the software would cause the system to be banned from classrooms within months of release.

== Legacy ==
Swapnote was seen as a successor to PictoChat for the Nintendo 3DS, although it did not allow for instant messaging. It was shut down in 2013. Swapdoodle, a 2016 revision with tighter restrictions, did not gain popularity.

A stage based on PictoChat appears in Super Smash Bros. Brawl. Another stage called "PictoChat 2" appears in Super Smash Bros. for Nintendo 3DS, and is exclusive to the portable variant. An HD version of "PictoChat 2" returns in Ultimate.
