= MapleStory DS =

2010 South Korean video game

- Developer: Nexon
- Publishers: Nexon, Nintendo of Korea
- Platform: Nintendo DS
- Release: KOR: April 15, 2010; JP: November 17, 2011
- Genres: Fantasy, RPG
- Mode: Single-player

MapleStory DS (Korean: 메이플스토리 DS; Japanese: メイプルストーリーDS) is a role-playing video game for the Nintendo DS. It is an adaptation of the original MMORPG game for Windows titled MapleStory. The game was released on April 15, 2010 in Korea, and was developed by Nexon and published by Nexon and Nintendo of Korea.

== Gameplay ==
The game features many elements present in the original MapleStory, such as needing to fight monsters and complete quests in order to make the player character more powerful. The game also features 4 different character classes, two of which are unlocked after completing the game once.

== Plot ==
After a jewel called Rubian causes the destruction of the kingdom of Sharenian via an ancient evil, it is split into four parts. Each playable character comes to acquire a piece of it and each sets out to unite with one another in order to recreate the jewel and expose and destroy the ultimate evil.

== Development and release ==
MapleStory DS was developed and published by Nexon, based on its MMORPG, MapleStory. The game was created as Nexon's desire to develop a title that could be played on consoles from other countries like Nintendo DS.

The game was announced at E3 2006. Nexon and the newly established Nintendo of Korea showcased MapleStory DS for the first time in January 2007, releasing a trailer for the game. The game was first projected to be released in September 2007, but was subject to numerous delays before its eventual Korean premiere on April 15, 2010. A unique MapleStory-themed Nintendo DSi was released alongside the game in Korea. In 2010, Daniel Kim, the CEO of Nexon America, said that "MapleStory DS is for the Korean market only" when asked if there would ever be an English language version of the game. Despite this, in 2012, the director of MapleStory DS Hong Sungjoon, said that there was some interest in porting the game to the Nintendo 3DS eShop.

MapleStory DS was not developed as MMORPG according to the manager of international business development at Nexon, Stephen Lee, who explained that the game is a single-player game with limited multiplayer features. In addition, MapleStory DS does not support Wi-Fi.

== Reception ==
Reception

Review score
Publication	Score
GameSpot	7.7/10

Famicom Tsūshin scored the game a 28 out of 40.

== Sequel ==
A sequel for the Nintendo 3DS, MapleStory Unmyeongui Sonyeo, was released in 25 April 2013 in South Korea.
