= Flipnote Studio =

Digital application for the Nintendo DSi

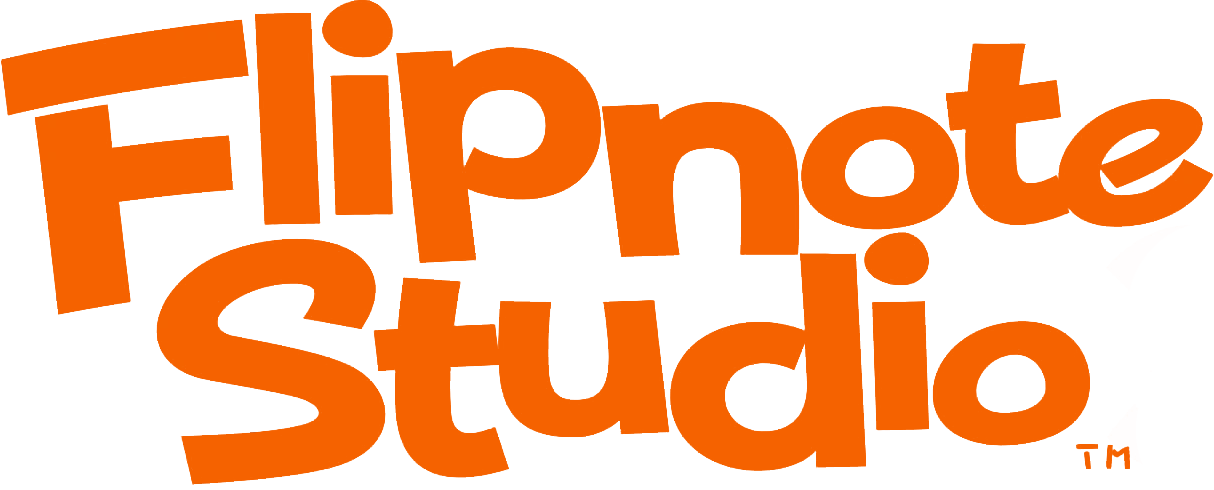
- Developer: Nintendo EAD Tokyo
- Publisher: Nintendo
- Director: Hideaki Shimizu
- Producer: Yoshiaki Koizumi
- Platforms: Nintendo DSi, Nintendo 3DS (modification only)
- Release: JP: December 24, 2008; NA: August 11, 2009; EU: August 14, 2009; AU: August 14, 2009
- Genre: Memo/Notepad/Animation
- Modes: Single-player, multiplayer online and locally

Flipnote Studio, known in Japan as Moving Notepad (うごくメモ帳, Ugoku Memochō), is a free downloadable 2D digital animation and media player application developed and published by Nintendo for the Nintendo DSi's DSiWare digital distribution service. Flipnote Studio allows users to create both word-based and picture-based notes with the stylus, add sound, and combine them to create frame-by-frame flipbook-style animations. In English-language keynote addresses and conferences prior to its release, the application was referred to as Moving Notepad by Nintendo, and was announced at E3 2009 officially as Flipnote Studio. It was released in Japan on December 24, 2008, in North America on August 11, 2009, and in Europe and Australia on August 14. It was later included as a preloaded program on the Nintendo DSi and DSi XL with firmware version 1.4.

An online service, titled Flipnote Hatena (うごメモはてな, Ugomemo Hatena), developed by Nintendo associate Hatena, acted as a social media platform where animations could be shared and viewed by other users. The service officially retired on May 31, 2013. However, users were still able to view Flipnotes from their Flipnote Hatena account via the Flipnote Gallery World service provided with Flipnote Studio 3D, until it was shut down on April 2, 2018.

After the closure of the Nintendo DSi Shop on March 31, 2017, the original Flipnote Studio is no longer available for download. It also cannot be transferred onto the Nintendo 3DS or downloaded from the Nintendo eShop due to its redundancy after the release of its successor Flipnote Studio 3D.

== Development ==
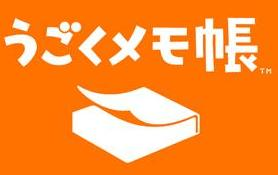
The Japanese logo of Moving Notepad (Flipnote Studio)

Flipnote Studio was developed by Yoshiaki Koizumi and Hideaki Shimizu. The two began working on the project without the knowledge of anyone else at Nintendo EAD Tokyo. It was initially designed as a tool for taking notes with the name Moving Notepad, and it was considered early on as a possible WiiWare application to transmit these notes from a DS to the Wii to be shared with other users of the application.

When the Nintendo DSi was announced, Nintendo president Satoru Iwata decided that the company would work with Hatena, which had recently shifted its R&D department to Kyoto, where Nintendo Corporate Labs is located. The partnership was announced shortly before the application's release in Japan. Koizumi said that they chose to work with Hatena because "it takes a special skill set to maintain the User Generated Contents (UGC) site, and we don't have that skill. We rely on Hatena on that part". Hatena president Junya Kondo stated that the Flipnote Hatena service would be developed and operated without financial support from Nintendo, with the hope that it would help introduce Hatena's other services to a new generation of internet users. After the creation of Flipnote Hatena, Nintendo and Hatena would continue to collaborate on online services such as Miiverse.

Flipnote Studio was released in Japan on December 24, 2008, and in August 2009 for some other markets.

== Features ==
In Flipnote Studio, the user can draw frame-by-frame to create animated sketches called Flipnotes. Each animation can hold up to 999 frames, at one of eight animation speeds (ranging from 0.5 to 30 frames per second), optionally looping. Each frame has two monochromatic layers, and is limited to a duotone color palette of black, white, red, blue, and dithered mixes thereof.

Opening the toolbox moves the animation from the touch screen to the top screen. There are three main drawing tools: a pen, a paintbrush, and an eraser, each with a selection of tips with different sizes and textures. The toolbox also provides an undo button, layer management, and onion skinning options. The user can enable additional tools including flood fill, a sketch layer, selection, cut, copy, and paste, and resizing and flipping.

An editing room screen allows frames to be removed, inserted, and pasted on a filmstrip timeline.

Photos can be imported from the Nintendo DSi Camera Album. The Japanese version of the software allows the user to take photos directly from Flipnote Studio itself. This feature was later added into Flipnote Studio 3D. In addition, the user may record up to 3 different sound banks (each holding up to 2 seconds of sound) with the system microphone or import sounds from the Nintendo DSi Sound application, then save them as a mastered soundtrack (which can hold up to 1 minute of sound).

The application is set to a right-handed mode by default. When drawing, the left and right buttons on the D-pad step through animation frames, the down button plays the animation, and the up button opens the toolbox. The A button changes the current drawing tool, the B button switches between layers, the X button clears the active layer, and the Y button can be used in combination with the D-pad to undo and redo. The L shoulder button triggers advanced tool options, mainly acting like a modifier key to show other buttons in the toolbox. The left-handed mode assigns these functions to the buttons on the opposite side of the console.

=== Flipnote Hatena (Ugomemo Hatena) ===
Flipnote Hatena
- Developer: Hatena; Nintendo
- Type: Memo/Notepad/Animation
- Launched: JP: December 24, 2008; WW: August 2009
- Discontinued: WW: May 31, 2013
- Last updated: 2.5 (February 17, 2012)
- Platforms: Nintendo DSi; Mobile; Browser
- Status: Defunct
- Members: ~4–6 million (including non-registered, non-linked Hatena IDs from the DSi, Hatena IDs, and hidden users.); 1.2 million

Flipnote Hatena was a social media service that hosted uploaded Flipnotes. The name also refers to the portion of the Flipnote Studio application that connects to this service (the Japanese version of the program differentiates between the two, but not the English version). Through the Nintendo DSi client, users were able to download Flipnotes to their DSi, upload their own Flipnotes, and add stars to Flipnotes uploaded by others. Users could also "spin off" another user's Flipnote, by downloading it and editing it.

The service let users rate and comment on others' works, and embed their animations into other webpages. Users could also flag submissions as inappropriate; flagged Flipnotes were hidden from the DSi client and risked removal altogether.

When uploaded, Flipnote animations were placed into specific categories by their creators. These categories, known as "channels", included general classifications such as "Musical" and "Comedy", as well as more specific categories suggested by popular Flipnote users and accepted by Hatena. For example, the categories "Stick Figures", "Spoof", and "Birds" were added at the request of users.

==== Stars ====
Flipnote Hatena had its own economy of "stars". Stars were used to rate Flipnotes (similarly to YouTube's "likes"), and users could add as many stars as they desired to any Flipnote. In addition to the regular Stars, users could purchase or earn Color Stars. In increasing rarity, these colors were green, red, blue, and purple. Users could earn Green Stars by reporting inappropriate Flipnotes, using other Hatena services, posting Flipnotes frequently (based on the number of days they posted Flipnotes), or managing a popular Channel. Red Stars were given to creators whose Flipnotes were featured in the Weekly News. In addition, users could purchase "boxes" containing a certain number of Color Stars. The contents of these boxes were randomized, so users wouldn't know how many stars of each color they would receive; but the larger the purchased box was, the more likely the user was to receive rare Color Stars.

==== End of service ====
The closure of Flipnote Hatena was announced prior to the release of Flipnote Studio 3D. The service was officially shut down on May 31, 2013.

Nintendo announced that the Flipnotes on Flipnote Hatena would be transferred to the new online service for Flipnote Studio 3D. They were accessible from the Nintendo DSi Gallery, a free-to-access section of the Flipnote Gallery: World service. The main purpose of the DSi Gallery was for users to transfer their Flipnotes from Flipnote Studio to Flipnote Studio 3D, where they could be edited like any other Flipnote. Flipnote Gallery: World was never released outside of Japan. Instead, other regions were given a service called the Nintendo DSi Library, where users could download their Flipnotes from Flipnote Hatena. Services for Flipnote Gallery: World and Nintendo DSi Library ended on April 1, 2018.

A fan-made replacement service called Sudomemo was launched in 2014. Sudomemo aims to recreate much of the original experience and functionality of the original Flipnote Hatena service, including the ability to upload and view Flipnotes directly from the Flipnote Studio application. In 2022, Sudomemo launched an archive called Flipnote Archive, containing over 44 million Flipnotes that had been posted to Flipnote Hatena, equivalent to roughly 12 TB of files.

=== Sharing Flipnotes ===
Aside from the Flipnote Hatena website, Flipnotes may be shared between two users via the DSi's Wireless Communication feature. When a Flipnote has been shared in this manner, the users may choose to save their contact information as friends on the Nintendo DSi and on the Flipnote Hatena website. Flipnotes may also be saved to an SD card (to be inserted into another DSi). When a person receives a Flipnote from a creator the first time, they become friends with each other.

=== PPM file format ===
PPM
- Filename extension: .ppm
- Internet media type: image/x-portable-pixmap image/x-dsi-ppm
- Developed by: Nintendo
- Type of format: Container format
- Extended to: KWZ

Para Para Manga Koubou (PPM) is a video file format created by Nintendo, used to store Flipnote animations. The format consists of metadata including the author's name and creation time, animation frame bitmaps with simple I-frame and P-frame video compression, and ADPCM-encoded audio tracks. PPM files are viewable in fanmade applications, such as the Flipnote Player website and the Playnote Studio Playdate application.

== Other uses ==
An example short animation depicts the Hungry Wolf of the titular series by the Spanish animator Jose Candel using Flipnote Studio.

In 2010 and 2011, as part of the 25th Anniversary celebrations for the Mario and Zelda series, Nintendo sponsored official Flipnote contests. For both contests, users were invited to create a Flipnote based on the series using template Flipnotes (with music and sound effects) posted on Flipnote Hatena. Entries were judged and selected by some of the head developers of the series, including Eiji Aonuma for the Zelda Flipnotes, and Shigeru Miyamoto for the Mario Flipnotes. Winning Flipnotes were made available to view on YouTube and Nintendo's official website, the Nintendo Channel, and the 3DS eShop (Zelda winners only).

Musicians have used Flipnote Studio to create animated music videos for their songs.

== Reception ==
Reception

Aggregate score
| Aggregator | Score |
|---|---|
| Metacritic | 93/100 |

Review scores
| Publication | Score |
|---|---|
| IGN | 9.0/10 |
| Official Nintendo Magazine | 95% |

Award
| Publication | Award |
|---|---|
| IGN | Editor's Choice Award (2009) |

Flipnote Studio received positive reviews upon its release in the west, with praise directed towards its features, ability to share animations locally to others, and inclusion of a social media platform in Flipnote Hatena (the first ever Nintendo social media). It was criticized for a low page and space limit, lack of colors (with only red and blue), region-locked online service, and tendency to glitch.

As of January 2009, there had been more than 100,000 user-submitted creations. During its first six months of operation in Japan, Flipnote Hatena received over 1,000,000 user-submitted creations.

IGN gave the Flipnote Studio an "outstanding" rating of 9.0/10, while also giving it an editors' choice award.

Official Nintendo Magazine awarded it 95%.

== See also ==
- Miiverse
- Swapnote
- Kékéflipnote – French animator
