= Foto Showdown =

2009 video game

- North American box art (prototype)
- Developer: Alpha Unit
- Publishers: JP: Alpha Unit; NA: Konami
- Platform: Nintendo DSi
- Release: JP: November 19, 2009; NA: March 9, 2010
- Genre: Turn-based
- Modes: Single-player, multiplayer

Foto Showdown, known in Japan as Monster Finder (モンスターファインダー, Monsutā Faindā), is a turn-based video game made exclusively for the Nintendo DSi. It was released in Japan on November 19, 2009, and in North America on March 9, 2010. The game revolves around players using their monsters to battle against rivals. By winning tournaments and battles, players can advance through the game via upgrades and unlocking more powerful items. The game allows players to take advantage of the DSi outer camera by allowing them to spawn certain monsters for use in battle based on the dominant colors in the photo.

== Gameplay ==
Foto Showdown has players using their party of up to six monsters to battle against enemies in turn-based combat to progress through tournaments. During battles the bottom screen displays the monsters and user interface, while the top screen displays information about the currently selected monster.

== Reception ==
Reception

Aggregate score
Aggregator	Score
GameRankings	74%

Review scores
Publication	Score
Famitsu	25/40
GameRevolution	C−
GameZone	8/10

The game received above-average reviews. Josh Laddin of GameRevolution said, "Foto Showdown feels like a tech demo for the DSi that doesn't show off any tech." In Japan, Famitsu gave it a score of one seven and three sixes for a total of 25 out of 40.
