= Swapnote =

Nintendo 3DS messaging software

- Home menu of Swapnote, with Nikki pictured in center
- Other names: Nintendo Letter Box; Suddenly Exchange Diary
- Developers: Nintendo NBD; Denyusha Co., Ltd.
- Release: JP: December 21, 2011; WW: December 22, 2011
- Platform: Nintendo 3DS
- Predecessor: PictoChat
- Successor: Swapdoodle
- Type: Drawing

Swapnote, known as Nintendo Letter Box in Europe and Itsu no Ma ni Kōkan Nikki (Note: いつの間に交換日記, lit. "Unnoticed Diary Exchange") in Japan, is a messaging application for the Nintendo 3DS. Similar in premise to PictoChat for the Nintendo DS, Swapnote allows users to create hand-drawn illustrations and messages, which can be adorned with voice clips, photos, and decorative stationery. Notes can then be sent locally to other 3DS owners with StreetPass or online to friends registered on the console via SpotPass.

Swapnote began development for the Nintendo DSi in November 2008 as a collaboration between Nintendo Network Business and Development (NBD) and Japanese game developer Denyusha. It was first conceived as a personal diary service, without the note-exchanging component. At the suggestion of Nintendo NBD general manager Masaru Shimomura, director Daiji Imai implemented networking capabilities to give users the ability to share their diaries with one another. Production moved from the DSi to the 3DS around April 2010 to take advantage of the console's SpotPass mechanic and autosteroscopic 3D effect.

Swapnote was released on December 21, 2011 in Japan and December 22 worldwide as a digital download on the Nintendo eShop. The service was positively received by video game publications for its multitude of features. Nikki, a Mii character who served as Swapnote's mascot, gained popularity among Nintendo fans and made numerous cameo appearances in future Nintendo titles. The service's SpotPass functionality was discontinued on October 31, 2013, allegedly due to recurring incidents of offensive material being distributed online. Critics expressed disappointment with the decision, believing it was needlessly severe. A standalone successor to Swapnote also for the 3DS, titled Swapdoodle, was released on November 17, 2016.

== Features ==
Swapnote is a free-to-install messaging application for the Nintendo 3DS similar in premise to PictoChat for the Nintendo DS. Swapnote allows users to create hand-drawn messages and illustrations, called "notes", using the 3DS' stylus. Notes can be distributed to registered 3DS friends online via SpotPass or other 3DS owners locally using StreetPass. Users can also attach handwritten comments onto each other's notes. Users can create a maximum of four pages per note, where they can add photographs taken with the 3DS' camera, voice clips obtained with the 3DS' microphone, and decorative stationery that change the background of a note. A "3D pen" is also available, allowing users to create three-dimensional pictures. When viewing users' notes, their writing process is reproduced as an animation.

The software features a mascot known as Nikki, a Mii character wearing red glasses and a green jacket, who is featured in tutorial messages as a guide. On certain occasions, such as Valentine's Day, Nikki would write directly to the user. Some of Nintendo's own executives, such as Satoru Iwata, Reggie Fils-Aimé, and Eiji Aonuma, utilized Swapnote to promote upcoming games and broadcasts directly to users.

== Development ==
Swapnote was produced by Nintendo Network Business and Development (NBD) in partnership with Denyusha Co., Ltd., a Japanese game developer who previously worked with Nintendo on the Pokémon Mini console, Nintendo Zone service, and Japan-exclusive Demae Channel for the Wii. Daiji Imai and Yu Kitai from Nintendo NBD served as director and stationery designer respectively, while Satoshi Takenouchi and Motomasa Kondo from Denyusha were lead programmer and user interface designer respectively.

=== Initial conception for the Nintendo DSi (2008–2009) ===
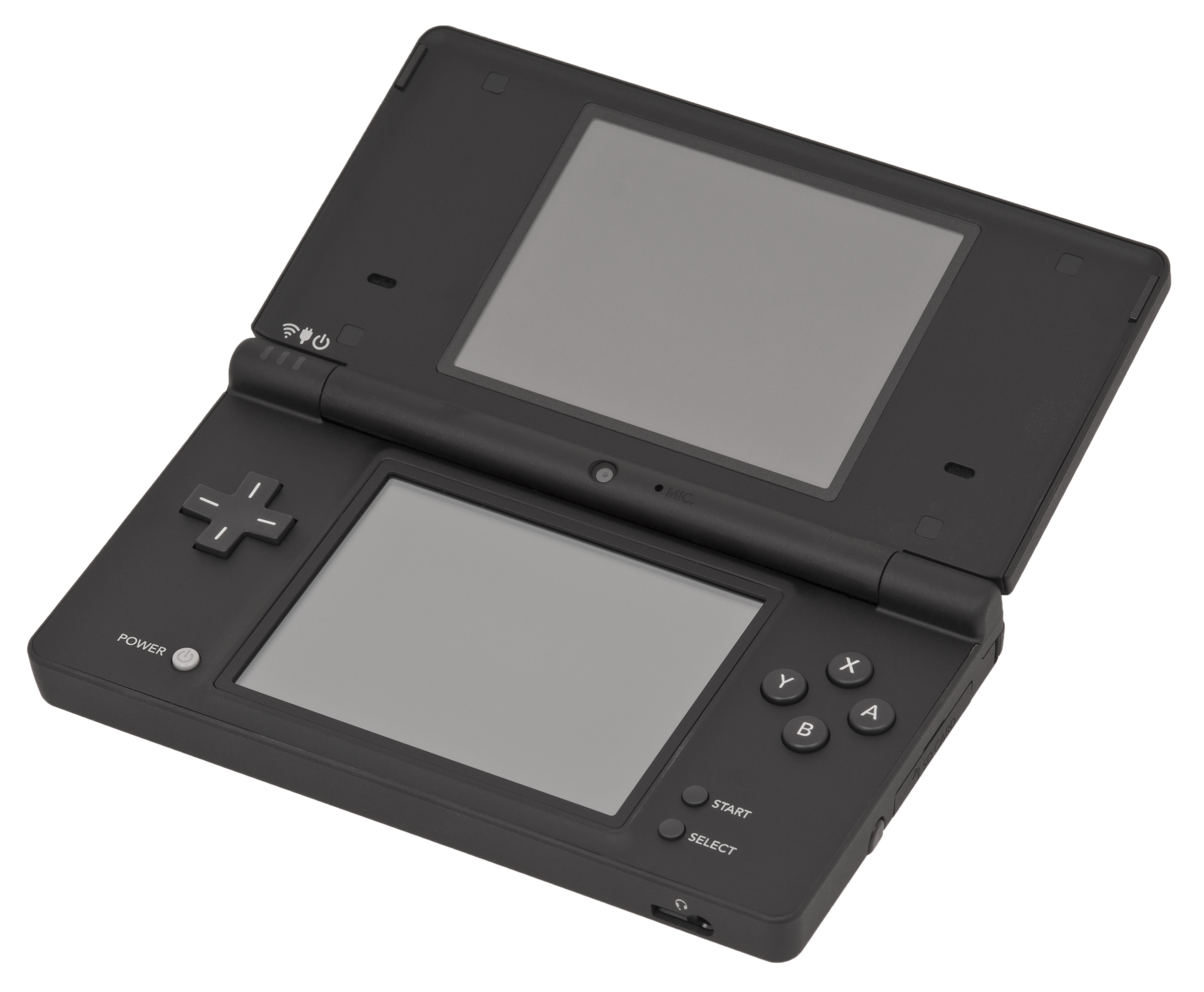
Swapnote began development for the Nintendo DSi (pictured) and was nearly completed on the console by 2009

Development on Swapnote began immediately following the release of the Nintendo DSi in November 2008. During discussions about the lack of downloadable software for the system, the idea of a "picture diary" service was proposed, and Imai volunteered to develop such a service. One of Imai's inspirations was the concept of recording a person's life as a child into a diary and gifting it to them when they grew up, just as his sister had done for her own child. He believed that imbuing one's own personal feelings into a device would turn it into an "important treasure", and to reinforce this idea, the software would focus solely on hand-writing messages rather than typing to better bring out the author's personality. Swapnote began production for the DSi without the note-exchanging component and was initially projected to release within three months, but ultimately extended to three years in total.

The development team began creating their own personal diaries to better understand how maintaining one felt; after a month, the only ones who continued the experiment were Imai, Takenouchi, and Kondo. Takenouchi was initially hesitant about the idea of a digital diary, concerned about a potential lack of demand for handwritten messaging, but grew to appreciate journaling during the experiment. He felt that the handwritten element of journals, such as "adding in a little illustration or adding emphasis through large letters", was fun and allowed people to "clearly leave behind [their] memories". The team was concerned, however, that there was not enough to stop users from abandoning their diaries after a few days. Around this point, the general manager of Nintendo NBD, Masaru Shimomura, told Imai it felt strange that a product developed by a "network" division did not have networking functions. Imai chose to implement these functions, despite the fact that it would prolong development time, because he liked the idea of sharing one's thoughts and feelings with close friends and family.

Imai remarked that while he had no grand ambitions regarding the software, he hoped that it would evolve into a platform that family members would use on a daily basis to connect with one another. The team added the ability to play back a user's writing process, as they felt it provided a unique lens into their personality. The application was nearly completed by 2009 but encountered technical limitations. For example, the DSi had no dedicated friends list, and the one that the developers coded into Swapnote could only register 18 users. Additionally, users needed to manually access the service to confirm if they had received a message. This created worries that users would frequently feel disappointed if they checked the service believing they had received a message when they actually had not. Around this period, word of the 3DS' development, as well as its SpotPass feature, reached the Swapnote team.

=== Move to the Nintendo 3DS (2010–2013) ===
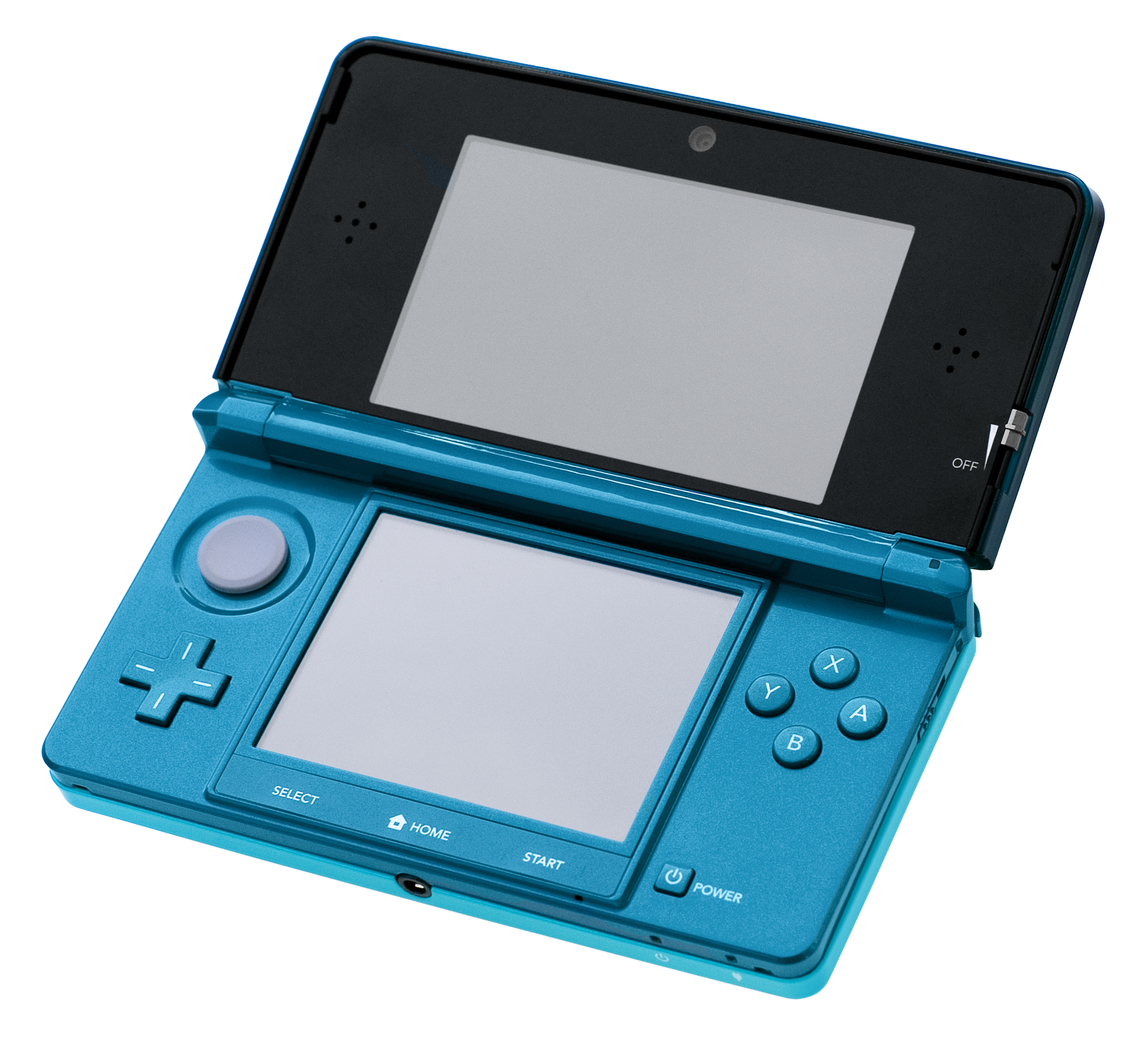
The instantaneous connectivity of SpotPass and the console's autostereoscopic 3D features led the Swapnote team to remake the service for the Nintendo 3DS (pictured) beginning in 2010

As SpotPass would allow the aforementioned close friends and family to receive messages instantaneously, Imai excitedly proposed remaking Swapnote for the 3DS to then-Nintendo president Satoru Iwata. The process began in April 2010. By this point, Takenouchi was first shown the autostereoscopic 3D features of the 3DS, compelling the team to brainstorm artistic applications of 3D in Swapnote. This resulted in the creation of the 3D pen, which was refined through trial-and-error.

Adding decorative stationery was proposed back when Swapnote was still being developed for the DSi. After some playtesters asked for explicit direction when given a blank page, the team decided to include stationery that would stimulate users' creativity. As stationery was considered more popular among women, the team studied comic books and magazines geared towards the demographic. Around mid-to-late 2011, Kitai was working on a separate project when her team, including some female designers, received a request to look over the Swapnote team's stationery, of which there were over fifty. Kitai remarked that they "were interesting and pleasant, but they weren't cute". She subsequently joined the team, and most of the designs were remade with assistance from Denyusha.

Nikki was created to provide users a guide to the creative process. The developers wanted Nikki's lectures to be useful for those unsure of what to write, "so she drew cats and stars and footprints—the kinds of things that anyone can easily copy". Since many of the developers themselves did not fully understand SpotPass, she served a dual purpose of tutorializing the mechanic to users in a digestible way. The team rotated through numerous character designs, including a balloon and a "combination of a bird and a ghost" that was rejected for being overly convoluted. To tie in the software to the 3DS, the team settled on a Mii character. "Auditions" were held for a multitude of Mii designs provided by Denyusha. Her name is a reference to the Japanese word nikki, which means "diary". Another name proposal was "Fumi Kakuyo", which translates to "I'm gonna write a letter" in English.

== Release ==
Swapnote was revealed in a Nintendo Direct presentation centered on 3DS software held on October 21, 2011. The app was released on December 21 in Japan and December 22 elsewhere as a digital download on the Nintendo eShop. The service is referred to as Nintendo Lettter Box in Europe and Itsu no Ma ni Kōkan Nikki in Japan. On July 5, 2012, Nintendo updated Swapnote to add six new colors of ink, with only one color being available per message. On April 11, 2013, an update implemented the ability to take photos or record audio directly through the application, undo drawings, and use different colors on each page of a message.

=== Discontinuation of SpotPass features ===
Multiple incidents in Japan were reported in which minors used Swapnote with adults who had exploited it to exchange pornographic imagery and were later arrested. Nintendo discontinued the SpotPass functionality of Swapnote on October 31, 2013, rendering local connectivity via StreetPass the only way to distribute notes. The company cited recurring incidents of offensive material being distributed through Swapnote, including towards children, as reasoning for the shutdown. Nintendo additionally pledged to more actively raise awareness of the 3DS' parental control features. The company issued an apology to those who had been using the application in a responsible manner.

A software update for Swapnote was released on December 15, 2020, titled "Swapnote Remastered". The patch notes state that the update "fixed some problems" with the application. Liam Doolan of Nintendo Life presumed that the update had in reality fixed a network vulnerability exploitable over StreetPass that was previously uncovered by a data miner, who was gifted a monetary reward from Nintendo.

== Reception ==
Four weeks after release, over ten million notes and comments were sent globally. Swapnote elicited favorable reviews from video game publications for its multitude of features. James Newton of Nintendo Life praised its 3D drawing mechanic as powerful for creative expression. He also applauded Swapnote's online functionality, but critiqued latency issues regarding the speed of incoming and outgoing notes. An anonymous writer for Inside Games appreciated the ability to upload photos, which they felt compensated for their lack of writing or drawing skills. Andy Hoover of Nintendojo and an anonymous Famitsu contributor called the service fun to use, with Hoover listing Swapnote as among the best eShop titles of 2011. Samit Sarkar and Jeff Ramos, writing for Polygon, commended Nikki as a character, finding that her writing to the user on special events was a small yet charming addition. Mikame Yukiyomi, reviewing for Inside Games, complimented Swapnote's commenting feature and its requring of users to hand-write their messages, perceiving it as a digital evolution in the analog practice of exchanging letters. Thomas Whitehead, writing for Nintendo Life, found significant potential in Swapnote, forecasting that it would evolve into a key facet of the 3DS' appeal. As with Yukiyomi, Whitehead particularly praised the application's handwritten element, saying, "No matter how illegible our writing or how primitive our drawings, we're reminded that we are all individuals, communicating in our own unique ways."

Journalists responded unfavorably towards the complete removal of SpotPass features and Nintendo's rationale for doing so. Kyle Orland of Ars Technica deemed Nintendo's limiting of the service unnecessarily severe. Emphasizing that the 3DS itself has an unfiltered, built-in web browser, Orland believed that preventing children being exposed to offensive content online should be the responsibility of parents rather than Nintendo. Hollander Cooper of GamesRadar+ echoed the sentiment of Orland by calling attention to the fact that pornographic imagery could be readily accessed in the 3DS' web browser. Whitehead criticized Nintendo's attempts to fix the problem as overbearing. He rationalized the company's actions as a fervent effort to maintain their family-friendly and accessible image, but remarked that Nintendo "should ensure [content moderation] serves the majority and punishes the minority". Destructoid's Steven Hansen called Nintendo's content limitations overly paternalistic and unfair to Swapnote users, such as himself and his friends, who utilized the platform for harmless artistic expression. Hansen and Cooper considered Swapnote as a service useless due to the restrictions, and Orland commented that while local wireless features remained intact, "at that point it’s probably just easier to, um, talk to the person in the real world".

== Legacy ==
Following the release of Swapnote, Nikki attracted popularity among Nintendo fans. Nintendo distributed an official QR code for users to download Nikki's Mii onto their consoles, and in Japan, released a home menu theme for the 3DS depicting Nikki. A 3DS game featuring Nikki, titled Nikki's Travel Quiz, (Note: ニッキーの旅するクイズ, Nikkii no Tabisuru Kuizu) was released exclusively for members of the Japanese Club Nintendo rewards program. Nikki has made cameo appearances in future Nintendo titles, particularly in Nintendo Badge Arcade (2014), Super Mario Maker (2015) as an unlockable costume, and Super Smash Bros. Ultimate (2018) as an Assist Trophy.

=== Swapdoodle ===
Swapdoodle
- Other names: Illustrated Exchange Diary
- Developer: Nintendo
- Release: November 17, 2016
- Platform: Nintendo 3DS
- Predecessor: Swapnote

A standalone successor to Swapnote, titled Swapdoodle (known as Irasuto Kōkan Nikki (Note: イラスト交換日記, lit. "Illustrated Diary Exchange") in Japan), was released as a free-to-install digital download on November 17, 2016. The application retains several features from Swapnote, including SpotPass functionality, while adding new ones such as "doodle lessons" centered on various Nintendo franchises, stamps, and "secret pages" that remain hidden until a friend replies to them. Nikki returns as the service's mascot.

The application's features could be expanded with paid downloadable content (DLC), which add new pen colors, stationery, note capacity, and lessons. In some regions, DLC for Swapdoodle was available as rewards on My Nintendo that could be redeemed in exchange for Platinum Points. The 3DS eShop closed on March 27, 2023, while SpotPass sharing and other online services for the console were discontinued on April 8, 2024.
