= Nintendo DSi =

Handheld game console

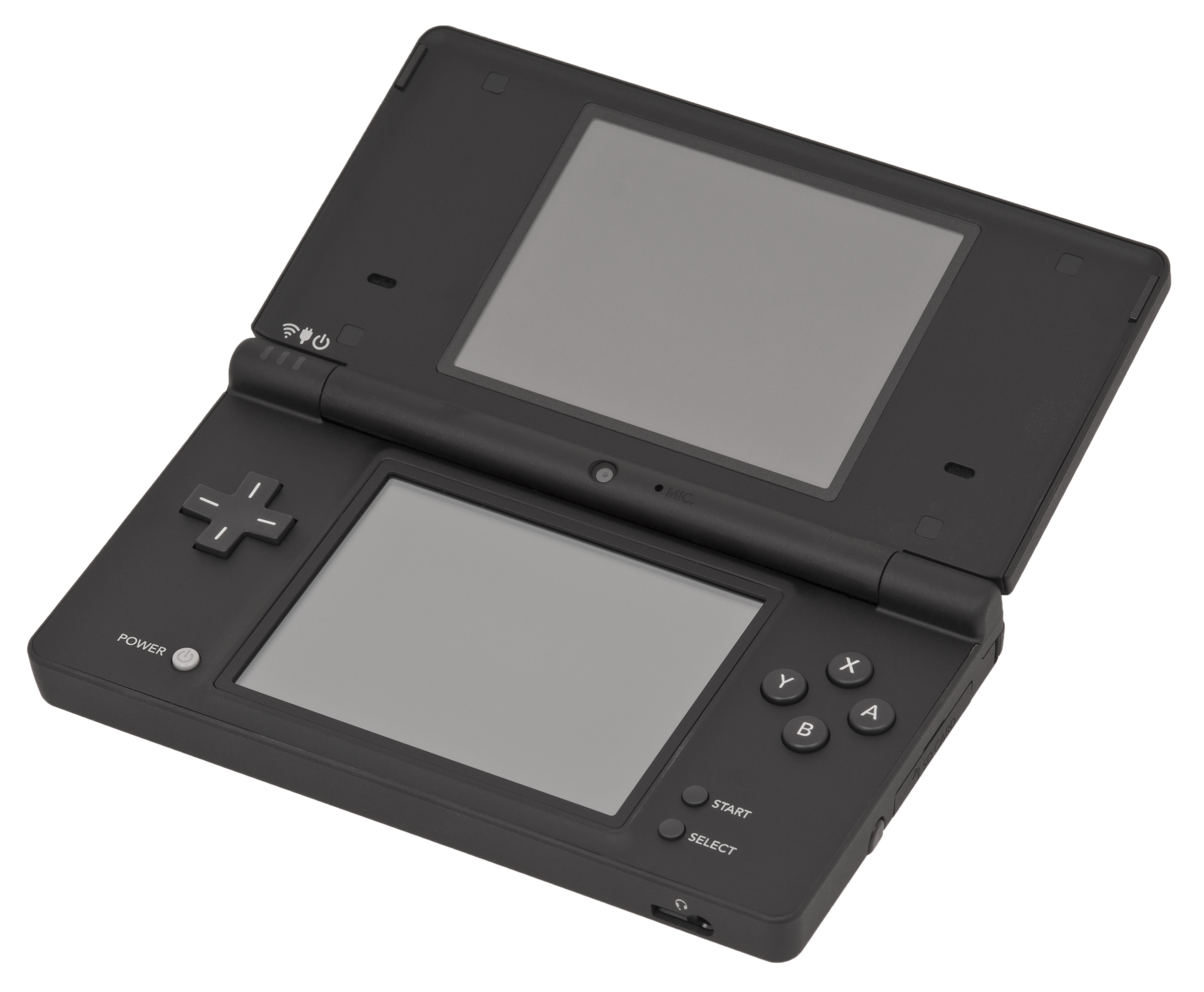
- Nintendo DSi console in black
- Manufacturer: Nintendo
- Product family: Nintendo DS
- Type: Handheld game console
- Generation: Seventh
- Released: November 1, 2008: Nintendo DSi: JP: November 1, 2008; AU: April 2, 2009; EU: April 3, 2009; NA: April 5, 2009; Nintendo DSi XL: JP: November 21, 2009; EU: March 5, 2010; NA: March 28, 2010; AU: April 15, 2010
- Discontinued: Yes; date undisclosed
- Units shipped: 41 million combined (as of September 30, 2014)
- Media: Nintendo DS Game Card; Nintendo DSi Game Card; Nintendo DSi Shop (digital distribution); SD card
- Operating system: Nintendo DSi system software
- CPU: 133 MHz ARM9; 33 MHz ARM7
- Memory: 16 MB RAM
- Storage: 256 MB internal flash memory SD card (up to 32 GB); Cartridge save
- Connectivity: Wi-Fi (802.11b/g)
- Online services: Nintendo Wi-Fi Connection; Nintendo DSi Shop; Nintendo Zone
- Predecessor: Game Boy Advance
- Successor: Nintendo 3DS

The Nintendo DSi (Note: Japanese: ニンテンドーDSi, Hepburn: Nintendō Dī Esu Ai) is a foldable dual-screen handheld game console developed and marketed by Nintendo. The console was released in Japan on November 1, 2008, and worldwide beginning in April 2009. It is the third iteration of the Nintendo DS, and its primary market rival was Sony's PlayStation Portable (PSP). The fourth iteration, titled Nintendo DSi XL, (Note: Japanese: ニンテンドーDSi LL, Hepburn: Nintendō Dī Esu Ai Eru Eru) is a larger model that launched in Japan on November 21, 2009, and worldwide beginning in March 2010. Development of the DSi began in late 2006, and the handheld was unveiled during an October 2008 Nintendo conference in Tokyo. Consumer demand convinced Nintendo to produce a slimmer handheld with larger screens than the DS Lite. Consequently, Nintendo removed the Game Boy Advance (GBA) cartridge slot to improve portability without sacrificing durability.

While the DSi's design is similar to that of the DS Lite, it features two digital cameras, supports internal and external content storage, and connected to an online store called the Nintendo DSi Shop. Nintendo stated that families often share DS and DS Lite consoles. Its new functionality was intended to facilitate personalization, so as to encourage each member of a household to purchase a DSi. The handheld supports exclusive physical media in addition to DS games with DSi-specific features and standard DS titles. The only exception to its backward compatibility are earlier DS games that required the GBA slot. Nintendo sold over 41 million DSi and DSi XL units combined. They were succeeded by the Nintendo 3DS in 2011.

Reviews of the Nintendo DSi were generally positive; IGN and bit-tech decried the console's lack of exclusive software and removal of the GBA cartridge slot, though its added functionality caused many journalists to recommend it to those who had not purchased a previous DS model. Numerous critics were disappointed with the limited resolution of DSi's cameras, though others, such as Ars Technica and GameSpot agreed they were adequate for the handheld's display. CNET and PCWorld considered the DSi Shop to be the most important buying incentive for current DS owners. Some critics believed the DSi XL was not an essential upgrade. GamePro and Wired UK, on the other hand, praised the DSi XL's larger screens for improving the gameplay experience and revitalizing older DS games.

== Development ==
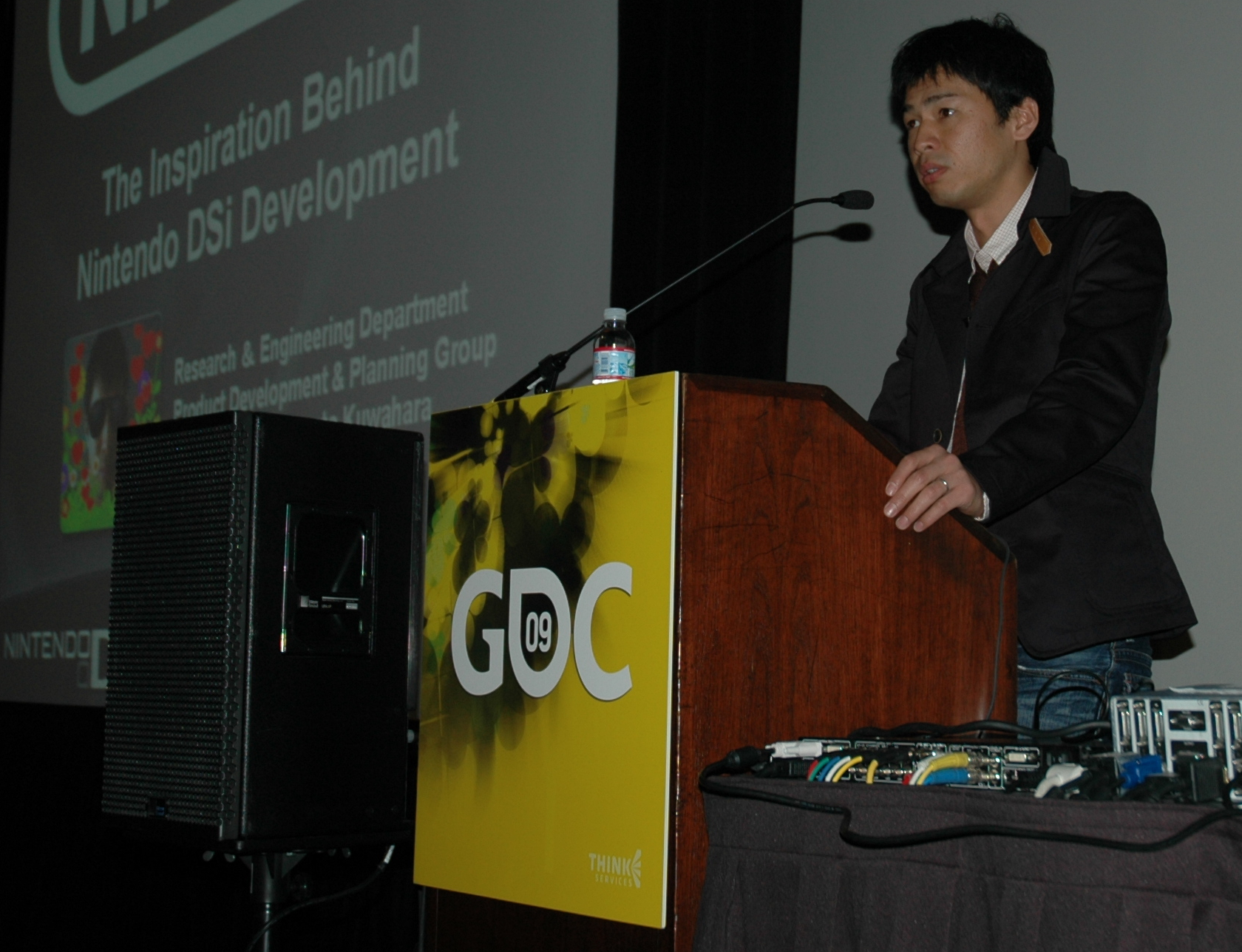
Kuwahara discussed DSi's creation at the 2009 Game Developers Conference.

Development of the Nintendo DSi started at the end of 2006. It was the first time Masato Kuwahara of Nintendo's Development Engineering Department served as a hardware project leader. Work went at a quick pace to meet deadlines; his team had to devise a theme for the new DS in time for a late December presentation, and by February 2007, most specifications for a chipset had to be completed. Kuwahara reported that his team had difficulty determining the potential market for the handheld during the design process; he said of their goal, "We have to be able to sell the console on its own [without games at launch]. It also has to be able to meld into the already-existing DS market." The console's digital cameras were considered early in development: Nintendo president and Chief Executive Officer Satoru Iwata described the touchscreen as the Nintendo DS's sense of touch, and the microphone as its "ears"; a co-worker suggested that it should have "eyes". Kuwahara's team originally wanted one camera with a swivel mechanism, but this was abandoned due to concerns of reliability, cost, and the need of a thicker console. Owing to consumer demand, Nintendo also improved the handhelds' volume and audio quality and made it slimmer with larger screens compared to the Nintendo DS Lite. However, to improve portability without sacrificing durability, the GBA cartridge slot present on earlier models was removed. To compensate, Nintendo continued to support the DS Lite as long as there was consumer demand for it.

"I made the presentation [...] then at the end asked everyone if this was a game system they would want to own. The result was three to seven. Three people wanted it, seven didn't. And I imagine that since one of the designers was standing right there in front of them, some of them held back their true opinion. In truth, it was probably more like one to nine. It was as bad as I had feared."

— Kuwahara on Nintendo EAD's reaction to the original DSi designs.

The DSi's size was changed midway through development, delaying its release. Its original design included two DS game card slots, because of demand from both fan communities and Nintendo employees, which consequently made it larger. When the console's designs were unveiled to Nintendo Entertainment Analysis and Development producers in October 2007, it was met with a lukewarm reception due to its size. However, Iwata and Kuwahara's own hopes resulted in the creation of a prototype. A quick hands-on investigation led them to abandon the dual-slot design, which made the DSi approximately 0.12 inches (3 mm) slimmer. Ever since the handheld's in-company unveiling, its internal designs were finished along with assembly and durability specifications. Iwata described having to resize the console so close to manufacturing as being essentially the same as making another handheld.

Yui Ehara, designer of the DS Lite and DSi's original casing, had to redesign the revised case. He advocated changing the six speaker apertures, as their circular perforations were redundant to the rest of the handheld's interface. He believed that this alteration also signaled a clearer distinction between the DSi and its predecessors while keeping the unit "neat" and "simple". Ehara hoped the DSi's added features would not interfere with his desired iconic image of the Nintendo DS product line: two rectangles, one on top of the other, with each half containing another rectangle inside. This model was publicly revealed at the October 2008 Nintendo Conference in Tokyo, along with its Japanese price and release date. While the DS product line's worldwide yearly sales figures consistently surpassed those of its primary market rival, Sony's PlayStation Portable, demand for it in Japan was decreasing; Nintendo's launch of the DSi was intended to stimulate sales. The company was less concerned with releasing the DSi in other territories, where DS Lite market demand remained high.

Development of a large DS Lite model in 2007 eventually led to the DSi XL. Nintendo had designed a large DS Lite model with 3.8-inch (97 mm) screens, compared to the standard 3-inch (76 mm) screens; development of this new handheld advanced far enough that it could have begun mass production. However, Iwata placed the project on hold due to consumer demand for the DS Lite and Wii. He later pitched the idea of simultaneously releasing large and small versions of the DSi instead, but Nintendo's hardware team was incapable of developing two models concurrently. After finishing work on the DSi, Kuwahara started the DSi XL project and became project leader. The DSi XL, a DSi model with 4.2-inch (110 mm) screens, was announced on October 29, 2009. Various names for it were considered, including "DSi Comfort", "DSi Executive", "DSi Premium", "DSi Living", and "DSi Deka" (Japanese for "large"). Mario creator Shigeru Miyamoto insisted on "DSi Deka". The handheld has an improved viewing angle over its predecessor, which allows onlookers to see the screen's contents more easily. This feature was absent from the large DS Lite model due to cost issues at the time, which also limited LCD screen size. The cost of LCD screens is determined by how many pieces are cut from a single large glass sheet. To keep these costs within a certain threshold, Nintendo set a screen size limit of approximately 3.8 inches (97 mm), which was later increased to 4.2 inches (110 mm).

== Launch ==
On November 1, 2008, the DSi was released in Japan; on April 2, 2009, in Australia and New Zealand, and on April 3 in Europe, all with a black and white casing. It launched in the United States and Canada on April 5, alongside the game Rhythm Heaven. It was the first DS console to launch with multiple colors in North America—black and blue. iQue released a Chinese DSi model in black and white, with a pre-installed version of Nintendogs, in December 2009; the Nikkei Sangyo Shimbun reported that the Chinese and Korean models featured improved security, to combat piracy. On April 15, 2010, the DSi was launched in South Korea in white, black, blue, and pink, alongside the game MapleStory DS. MapleStory DS was also bundled with a red limited-edition DSi, which had characters from the game printed around its external camera. Other countries the DSi was released in include Brazil, Russia, and Turkey.

Nintendo had shipped 200,000 units for the DSi's Japanese launch, and during its first two days on sale, over 170,000 units were sold (Note: 170,779 units were sold according to sales tracking service Enterbrain; or 171,925 units according to Media Create.)—the remaining units were either unclaimed pre-orders or reserved for sale on Culture Day. By the end of the month, the DSi sold 535,000 units, in comparison to 550,000 DS Lites sold in its launch month. In the two-day launch period, Europe and North American sales totaled 600,000 units combined. North American first week sales almost doubled the DS Lite's 226,000 units by selling 435,000. In the United Kingdom, the console totaled 92,000 sales within two days of release, which GfK/Chart-Track data showed to be the fourth-best opening weekend ever in the region—higher than previous records set by other DS iterations.

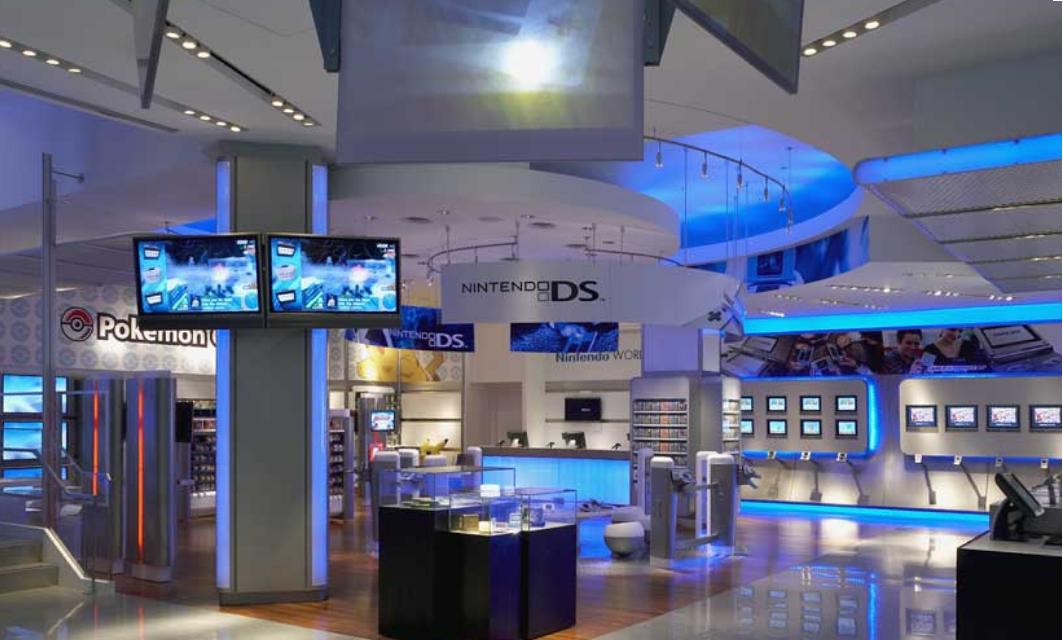
The Nintendo World Store in New York City hosted a launch event.

DSi launch events were held on the western and eastern coasts of the United States. Nintendo sponsored an official launch event at the Universal CityWalk in Los Angeles and the Nintendo World Store in New York City. The LA midnight launch party featured several events, including merchandise handouts, signings and art galleries from iam8bit, parkour demonstrations, and performances by Gym Class Heroes. Hundreds attended and over 150 stayed until midnight to purchase a unit at GameStop. A human-sized Lego DSi by artist Sean Kenney was on display at the Nintendo World Store.

The Nintendo DSi XL was released in Japan on November 21, 2009, in bronze, burgundy, and white. The former two colors were available for its European launch on March 5, 2010, and its North American launch on March 28. The console launched in Australia on April 15, 2010, in bronze and burgundy. The DSi XL was released in other countries including Brazil, South Africa, and Turkey. Over 100,500 units were sold during the console's first two days on sale in Japan, (Note: 103,524 units were sold according to sales tracking service Enterbrain; or 100,553 units according to Media Create.) and 141,000 units were sold during its first three days in the United States.

The 2011 release of the Nintendo 3DS, the successor to the Nintendo DS series of handhelds, was announced on March 23, 2010, to preempt impending news leaks by the Japanese press and to attract potential attendees to the Electronic Entertainment Expo. According to industry analysts, the timing drew attention from the North American launch of the DSi XL. M2 Research senior analyst Billy Pigeon argued the "XL is old news ... in Japan – and Nintendo is a very Japan-centric organization. This is just the corporate parent in Japan maybe not acting in the best interest of Nintendo of America." Iwata dismissed any significant impact when speaking to concerned investors, "those who are eager to buy Nintendo 3DS right after the announcement generally tend to react quickly to anything new on the market, and those who are purchasing a Nintendo DS today tend to react relatively slowly."

== Demographic and sales ==
2008–2012 Nintendo DS worldwide sales. Nintendo DS product line (black) with DSi (green), DSi XL (red), and DSi and DSi XL combined (orange).
Nintendo DSi sales figures (as of September 30, 2014)
Region	Units shipped	First available
Japan	5.90 million	November 1, 2008
Americas	12.35 million	April 5, 2009
Other regions	10.19 million	April 2, 2009
Total	28.44 million	
Nintendo DSi XL sales figures (as of September 30, 2014)
Japan	2.35 million	November 21, 2009
Americas	5.85 million	March 28, 2010
Other regions	4.74 million	March 5, 2010
Total	12.93 million	

Nintendo targeted a wider demographic profile with the first Nintendo DS (2004) than it had with the Game Boy line. Comparing 2008 life-to-date DS and DS Lite sales to the best-selling game console, Sony's PlayStation 2, showed potential in further expanding the Nintendo DS gaming population—particularly in Europe and the United States. To further promote the product line while expanding its gaming population, Nintendo created the DSi. Iwata has said that families often share DS and DS Lite consoles, so to encourage each family member to buy an individual handheld, Nintendo added personalization features to the DSi.

The "i" in DSi symbolizes both an individual person (I) and the handheld's cameras (eyes); the former meaning contrasts with the "i"'s in Wii, which represent players gathering together. Nintendo of America president Reggie Fils-Aimé said, "If Wii was about gaming for the masses, then think of DSi as creativity for the masses." Iwata has said that the DSi is meant to be a first camera for children, and a social networking device for adults. In response to media commentary following the DSi's announcement, Iwata insisted that its new audio and camera capabilities are not meant to compete with mobile phones, the iPod, or the PSP. He explained their role in the marketplace:

While cell phone and digital camera manufacturers have been trying to compete against each other by intensifying the picture pixel quality and zooming ability of their camera functions, and while music players are making its improvements mainly by making smaller exterior design and by increasing memory storage capacity, DSi is trying to propose a different path of evolution by providing the users with the opportunity to be able to touch and play with photographs and sounds.

The DSi helped maintain strong sales for Nintendo's handheld product line. The DSi accounted for 40 percent of its product line's 2009 United Kingdom sales and frequently topped weekly sales charts in Japan during its first year of availability. In the United States, the console's initial three-month sales surpassed those of the DS, DS Lite, and Wii. Average weekly sales of the Wii and Nintendo DS declined slightly in March; Nintendo DS hardware sales stabilized at over 200,000 units for seven months after the DSi's April launch, while Wii sales diminished. Gamasutra estimated that, in October 2009 and February 2010, 50 percent of Nintendo DS unit sales were DSi consoles. In an October 2009 interview, Fils-Aimé announced that the DSi had sold 2.2 million units in the United States. He said, "If you give the consumer great value in terms of what they pay, they're willing to spend, and we say [that] based on the experience of launching the DSi". The United States had its highest yearly DS sales in 2009 with 11.22 million units sold. The DSi and DSi XL accounted for 16.88 million of the 27.11 million units sold worldwide of its product line for Nintendo's 2010 fiscal year beginning April 1, 2009, and ending March 31, 2010.

In Gamasutra's United States hardware sales estimate for July 2010, the DSi and DSi XL each outsold the DS Lite. The website reported DSi sales of approximately 300,000 units in July 2009 and February 2010, which remains consistent for July 2010 if combined with DSi XL sales. As a result, the average price consumers were spending on the Nintendo DS hardware family rose to over $165 (in 2004 dollars, $190 adjusted for inflation as of 2010), which is over $15 more than the November 2004 launch price of the original Nintendo DS. Nintendo made its first DSi price cuts in Europe on June 18, 2010, for DSi and DSi XL consoles in Japan on June 19, and in North America on September 12. The DSi and DSi XL accounted for 14.66 million of the 17.52 million units sold worldwide of its product line in fiscal year 2011.

In a United States hardware sales estimate for July 2011 by Gamasutra following the DS Lite's price drop a month earlier, about 60 to 70 percent of approximately 290,000 DS units sold were DSi and DSi XL consoles. Lackluster 3DS sales forced Nintendo to drop its price to match the DSi XL in the United States on August 12. Japan and Europe had similar price reductions. Gamasutra speculated potential DS buyers in the United States opted for the 3DS as a result; DS sales for August 2011 decreased by 45 percent, while it combined with 3DS sales remained steady compared to the previous month. Nintendo made its second DSi and DSi XL price cuts in North America on May 20, 2012. Gamasutra called these price cuts the DS product line's "final send-off" and expects "by this time next year its contributions to the market will be minuscule. After Christmas, Nintendo will effectively be a single-handheld system company, putting all of portable software efforts into the Nintendo 3DS."

== Hardware ==
Dimensions (when closed) and mass
Depth	2.95 inches (74.9 mm)
Width	5.4 inches (137 mm)
Height	0.74 inches (18.9 mm)
Weight	7.5 ounces (214 g)

The Nintendo DSi's design is similar to that of the second DS iteration, the Nintendo DS Lite. It is approximately 12 percent shorter (0.10 inches (2.5 mm)) than the Nintendo DS Lite when closed, but slightly wider and lighter. The DSi has two 3.25-inch (83 mm) TFT-LCD screens—.25 inches (6.4 mm) larger than those of previous models—that are capable of displaying 262,144 colors. The touch sensitive lower screen accepts input from the included stylus. The handheld features four lettered buttons (X, Y, A, B), a directional pad, and Start, Select, and Power buttons. Two shoulder buttons, a game card slot, and a power cable input are placed under the console's hinge. The included AC adapter (WAP-002) is not compatible with any previous DS model.

Unlike previous models, the handheld has two VGA (0.3-megapixel) digital cameras. The first is on the internal hinge and points toward the user; the second is on the outer casing and faces away from the user. The SD card slot is also new, set behind a cover on the right side. While the DS Lite used a switch, the DSi, like the original Nintendo DS, features a button to power on or off. The button has extra functions and unlike the original's power button, it is located on the bottom-left side of the touchscreen. Brightness and volume controls are on the left side; five brightness settings—one more than on the DS Lite—are available. The headset port is on the bottom.

The DSi has a matte surface to hide fingerprints. It is available in numerous colors, but color selection varies by region. For example, lime green is exclusive to Japan, while red is available in Europe and North America. North America also received a different shade of blue. Numerous special-edition models and bundles have been released, including those for Ace Attorney Investigations: Miles Edgeworth, Final Fantasy Crystal Chronicles: Echoes of Time, and the 2009 Black Friday shopping day.

=== Technical specifications ===
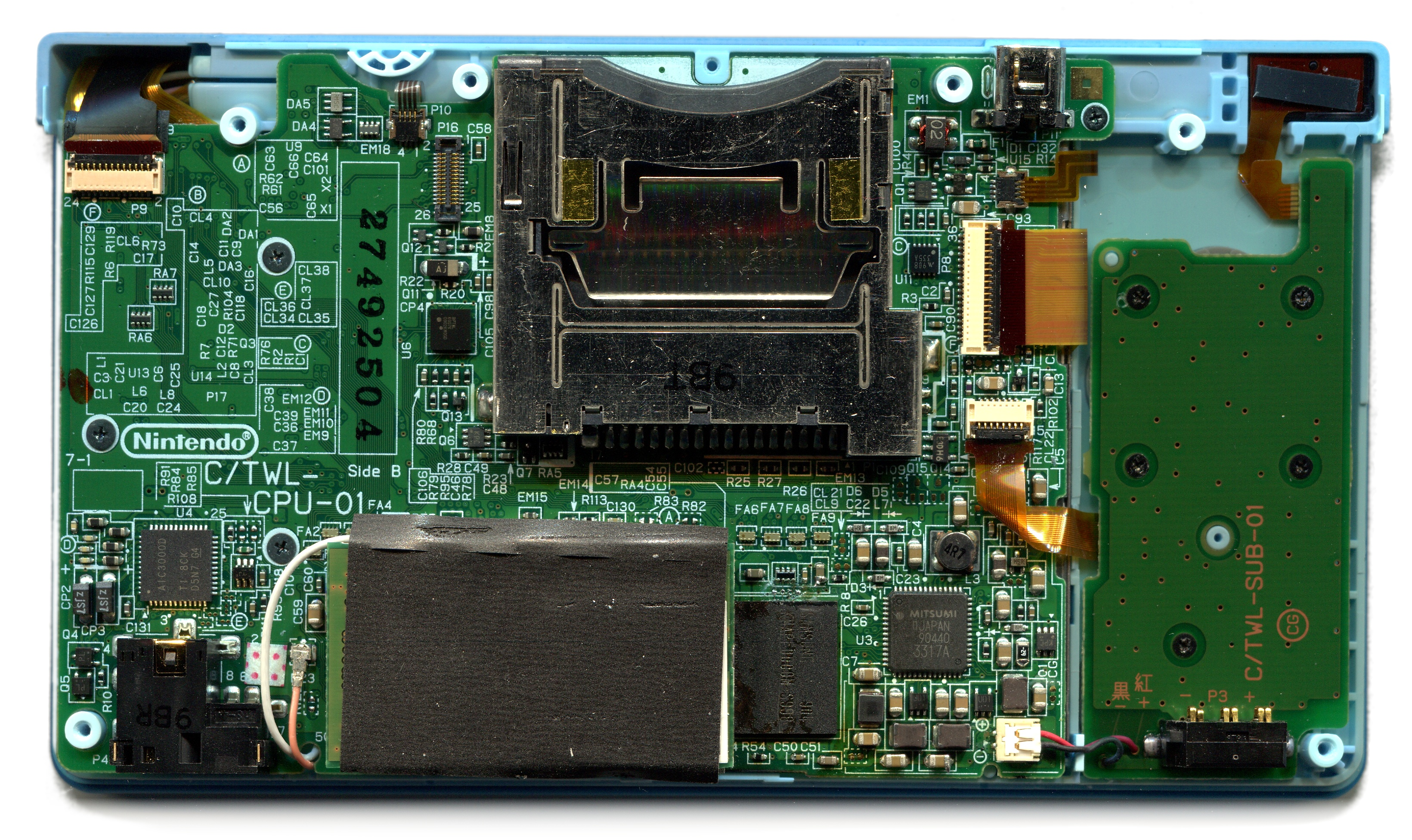
The DSi's main and sub-printed circuit boards

The DSi has more RAM and a faster CPU than the DS Lite. Developers reported the console has a native mode, which runs software specifically designed for its hardware, access to the system's extra processing and memory resources. The inclusion of a codec integrated circuit (a microchip) amplifies sound signals and converts them from digital to analog. This increases audio output and, depending on the mode, higher audio quality. Unused space on the motherboard was removed; the CPU was relocated, and the battery housing was expanded.

The camera's resolution is two-and-a-half times higher than the handheld's screens. However, their resolution is considerably lower than that of contemporaneous digital cameras and mobile phones. This was done to help keep their price reasonable and to maintain a preferable response time for viewing photos in quick succession, particularly since numerous applications will use them.

- CPU: The DSi has two ARM architecture CPUs: ARM9 clocked at 133 MHz and ARM7 clocked at 33 MHz. Its ARM9 is twice as fast as previous models.
- RAM: 16 MB (four times as much as previous models)
- Screen resolution: 256 × 192 pixels per screen (same as previous models)
- Cameras: 640 × 480 pixels
- Storage: 256 MB of internal flash memory with an SD card (up to 2 GB) and SDHC card (up to 32 GB) expansion slot
- Battery: Shorter than the DS Lite, regardless of brightness setting; for example, the DSi has a battery life of 9–14 hours on the lowest brightness setting, compared to the 15–19 hours of the DS Lite on the same setting. The battery is an 840 mAh internal rechargeable, compared to 1000 mAh for the DS Lite, and has an optimal lifespan of approximately 500 cycles; after this point, it may be replaced by the user.

=== Larger model ===
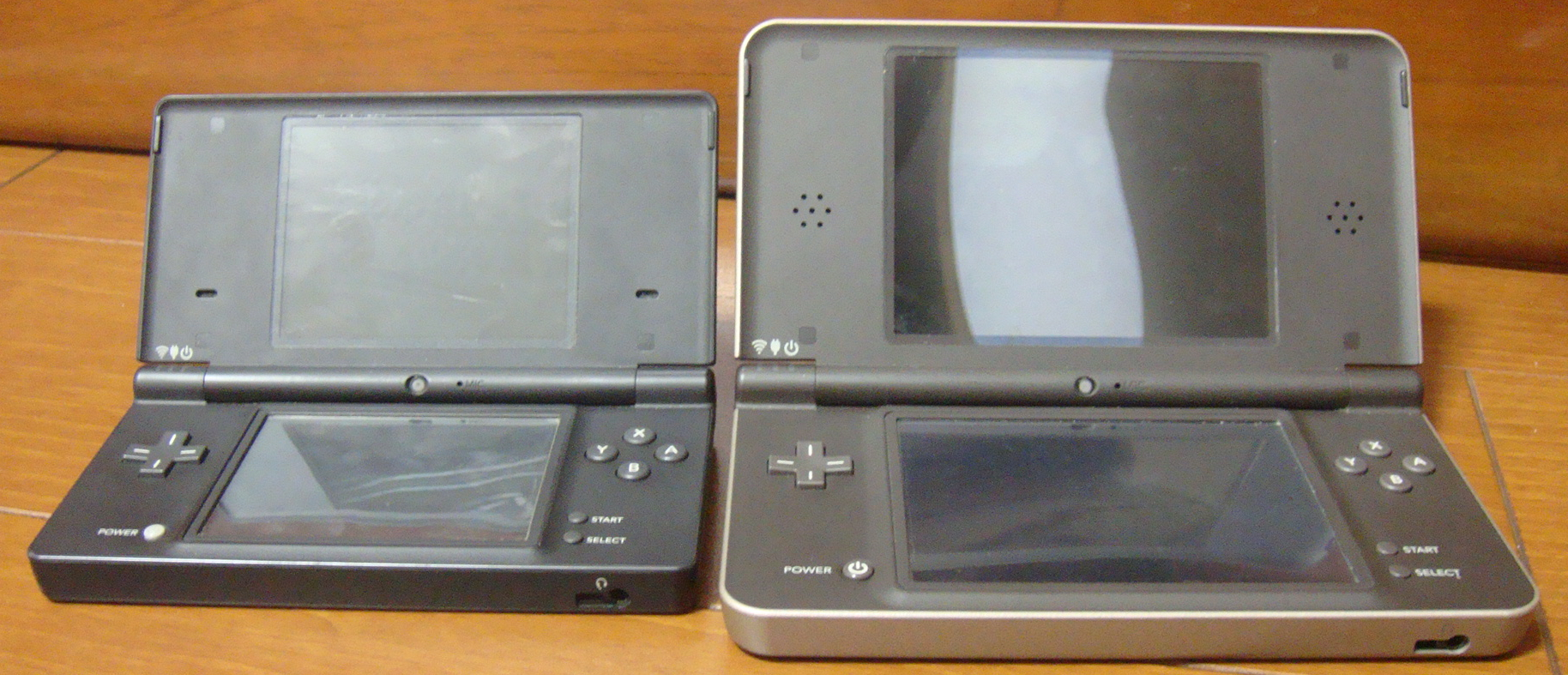
- The Nintendo DSi (left) with its DSi XL model. The larger model's white, black (pictured), and burgundy color schemes were intended to match with living room and dining room settings.
- Dimensions (when closed): Depth: 3.60 inches (91.4 mm); Width: 6.34 inches (161.0 mm); Height: 0.83 inches (21.2 mm)
- Weight: 11.1 ounces (314 g)

The Nintendo DSi XL features larger screens, and a greater overall size, than the original DSi. It is the fourth DS model, the first to be available as a pure size variation. Iwata said that cost restraints had, until then, limited the screen size and multiplayer aspects of portable game consoles, and that the DSi XL offers "an improved view angle on the screens", which makes it the first "portable system that can be enjoyed with people surrounding the gamer." He argued that this introduces a new method of playing portable video games, wherein those "surrounding the game player can also join in one way or the other to the gameplay." While the original DSi was specifically designed for individual use, Iwata suggested that DSi XL buyers give the console a "steady place on a table in the living room," so that it might be shared by multiple household members.

The DSi XL is the longest, widest and heaviest DS model. The console features two 4.2-inch (110 mm) wide-viewing-angle LCD screens with the same resolution as the smaller model. It has improved battery life over the DSi on all brightness settings; for example, batteries last 13–17 hours at the dimmest setting. The handheld is outfitted with identical speakers contained in larger speaker enclosures, enabling them to produce louder sound. The hinges stop the screen at 120° in addition to the original DSi's position of 155° to allow easier table-top viewing. The DSi XL is bundled with two longer styli, one of which is thicker, rounded, and pen-like, and does not fit inside the unit.

The DSi XL has a matte surface, and the exterior of its top panel is coated with a gloss finish. It is available in eight two-toned colors, varying by region such as white, green, red, yellow, and pink. Two special-edition models were released: those for LovePlus+ and the 25th anniversary of Super Mario Bros. Flipnote Studio and the Nintendo DSi Browser come pre-installed with the DSi XL, alongside other, region-specific software.

== Features ==
A closed DSi; the second camera is visible.

Like the Wii, the DSi has upgradeable firmware, and features a menu interface that displays applications as selectable icons. The seven primary icons represent the game card software, "Nintendo DSi Camera", "Nintendo DSi Sound", "Nintendo DSi Shop", "DS Download Play", "PictoChat", and "system settings"; additional applications could be downloaded from the DSi Shop. Icons are set in a single-row grid navigable with the stylus or D-pad, and may be re-arranged via drag-and-drop. The power button can either soft reset the console, returning it to the main menu, or shut it down. Game cards may be hot swapped when the console is set to the main menu, allowing players to switch game cards without shutting down.

The DSi has more extensive multimedia features than previous models; AAC audio files from other devices, pictures, and downloadable software can be stored to an SD card. The latter two do not need external storage and can be stored internally. Before taking a photograph, users may modify the viewfinder's live image with ten "lens" options. Images captured can be uploaded to the Wii's Photo Channel, and, for consoles with the 1.4 firmware update or greater, to the social networking website Facebook until its discontinuation on January 30, 2014.

The built-in sound player has voice recording and music playback functionality. Voice recordings can be edited with audio filters and manipulated through pitch and playback. Users may save and modify up to 18 ten-second sound clips. These clips cannot be exported to an SD card. Users can play music from SD cards with visualizations displayed on the upper screen. AAC audio with .mp4, .m4a, or .3gp filename extensions are supported, but non-AAC formats, including MP3, are not supported. Sounds like drum beats and the classic Mario jumping noises can be added with button presses. Playing music also has its own set of manipulation options similar to those used for voice recordings, as well as a group of audio filters. Using headphones, music can be played when the case is closed. Users may export photos, sounds, and Internet settings to a 3DS.

=== Internet connectivity ===
The Nintendo DSi connects to the Internet via either its built-in 802.11b/g Wi-Fi or a Nintendo Wi-Fi USB Connector; both methods granted access to the Nintendo Wi-Fi Connection service. The DSi supports WEP, WPA (AES/TKIP), and WPA2 (AES/TKIP) wireless encryption; only software with built-in support can use the latter two encryption types, as they were not supported by the DS and DS Lite. Up to six wireless Internet connection profiles can be saved; using the traditional setup method, the first three profiles support WEP encryption, while the remaining three are selectable under a more advanced option, which supports WPA encryption. Under this advanced option, users may access the Wi-Fi Protected Setup method and configure proxy settings. The DSi could automatically detect Nintendo Zone service areas, thus preventing the need to manually set up Wi-Fi connections. The service offered demos of upcoming and currently available games, access to the Nintendo Wi-Fi Connection and DSi Shop, and may have had location-specific content. The Nintendo Wi-Fi Connection service was discontinued worldwide for all platforms on May 20, 2014. The Nintendo Zone service was discontinued in Europe on March 28, 2018, and in Japan on February 28, 2020.

== Software library ==
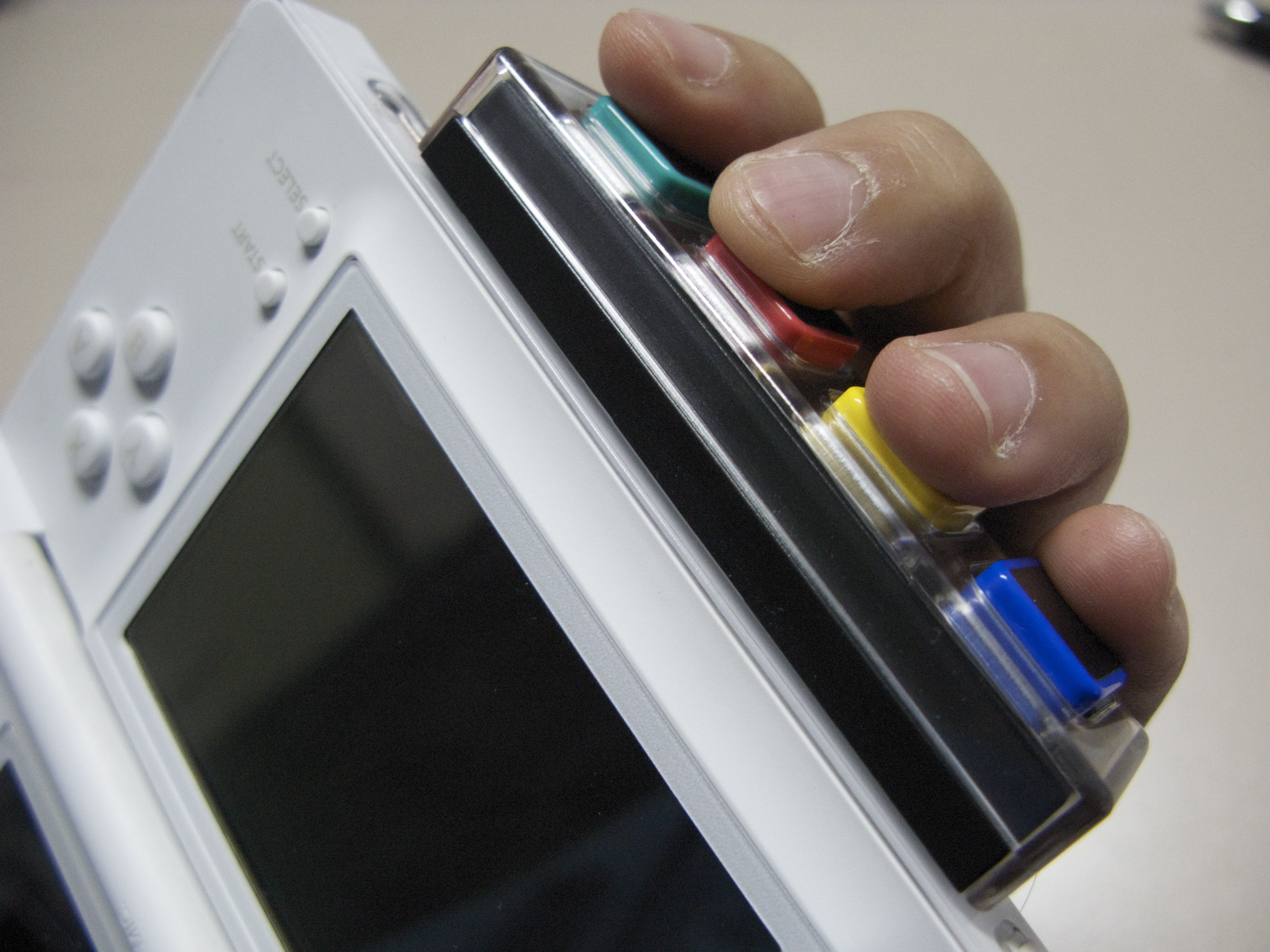
DS accessories requiring the GBA slot, like Guitar Hero: On Tour's guitar grip, are incompatible.

All DS games are compatible with the DSi, except those that require the GBA slot. Because of its absence, the DSi is not backward compatible with GBA Game Paks or with accessories that require the GBA slot, such as the Nintendo DS Rumble Pak and the Guitar Hero: On Tour series guitar grip. "DSi-enhanced" game cards contain DSi-exclusive features, but can still be used with earlier models; "DSi-exclusive" game cards cannot. The DSi is Nintendo's first region-locked handheld; it prevents using certain software released for another region. Due to regional differences in Internet services and parental controls, DSi-specific software is region locked. However, cartridge software compatible with previous models, Internet browsing, and photo sharing are not locked. (Note: IGN, however, tested a United States DSi-enhanced game on a Japanese DSi handheld and found it to be region-locked.) Homebrew flash cards designed for previous DS models are incompatible with the DSi, but new cards capable of running DS software on a DSi were available.

Like the Wii, the DSi could connect to an online store. The store, called the DSi Shop, allowed users to download DSiWare games and applications, which were paid for with DSi points. This is acquired with a Nintendo Points Prepaid Card (previously known as Wii Points Prepaid Card) or a credit card. Application prices followed a three-tiered pricing scheme. The service launched with the DSi Browser, a free web browser developed by Opera Software and Nintendo. A DSiWare trial campaign, whose expiration date varied by region, formerly offered 1,000 free Nintendo Points to each DSi that accesses the DSi Shop. (Note: Trial expiration date is based on when the DSi is released for the respective region. For example, expiring March 2010 in Japan, but March 2011 in China.) Over 500 downloadable games were available, varying by region. Purchased DSiWare on DSi or DSi XL consoles cannot be transferred between units unless that console is repaired or replaced by Nintendo. Most DSiWare can be transferred to a 3DS, however saved data cannot. Funding DSi Points was discontinued on September 30, 2016, and the Nintendo DSi Shop was shut down on March 31, 2017.

List of Nintendo DSi-exclusive game cards
Title	Region's retail release				Ref.
Title	Japan	North America	Europe	Australia	Ref.
Face Training: Facial exercises to strengthen and relax from Fumiko Inudo	Unreleased	Unreleased	September 24, 2010	Unreleased	
Foto Showdown	November 19, 2009	March 9, 2010	Unreleased	Unreleased	
Ghostwire: Link to the Paranormal	Unreleased	Unreleased	Unreleased	Unreleased	
Hidden Photo	Unreleased	Unreleased	Early 2011	Unreleased	
Picture Perfect Hair Salon	Unreleased	November 24, 2009	November 13, 2009	January 31, 2010	
System Flaw	Unreleased	October 27, 2009	January 21, 2011	Unreleased	

== Reception ==
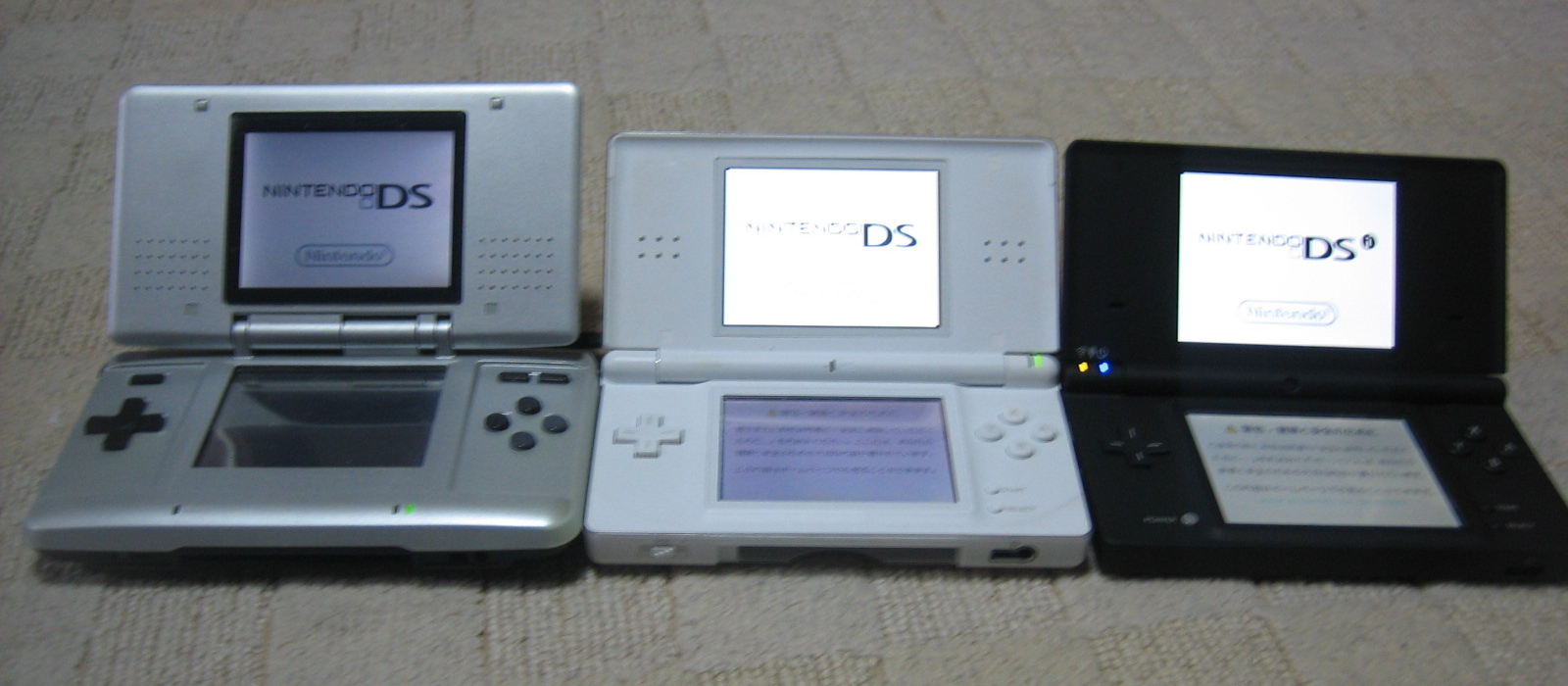
Original DS with Lite and DSi iterations respectively

The Nintendo DSi received generally positive reviews. Critics praised many of the console's changes to the DS Lite's aesthetic and functionality, but complained that it launched with insufficient exclusive software. (Note: According to Bit-tech, PCWorld New Zealand, Ars Technica, IGN, and CNET UK.) IGN's Craig Harris noted that the DSi-exclusive software library and DSi Shop were lacking in content even after five months on the Japanese market. Jeff Bakalar of CNET said that owners of the original DS should consider buying a DSi, but that its only incentive for DS Lite owners was the DSi Shop. PCWorld New Zealand's Jan Birkeland shared Bakalar's opinion, but believed that it was too early to judge the quality of DSi Shop software. Many critics were disappointed by the removal of the GBA cartridge slot, (Note: According to Bit-tech, CNET, BusinessWeek, IGN, and PCWorld.) but some of them, such as PCWorld's Darren Gladstone, Bit-tech's Joe Martin, and IGN's Harris and Lowe, believed that it was a reasonable exchange for SD card support and the DSi Shop. However, Bakalar stated, "We'd gladly give up the 4 millimeters [of reduced thickness] to be able to play any Game Boy Advance game."

Most reviewers criticized the quality of its cameras, particularly due to their resolution in comparison to contemporaneous mobile phones. They considered them sufficient for the DSi's screens, however. Harris and Lowe believed that the camera's only use was to take "silly pictures of yourself and others". They complained about the difficulty of taking photographs in low-light environments, and said that low-light images were tinged green or blue. Opinions on the DSi's photograph-editing tools were varied: Bit-tech's Martin and Reid considered them to be a gimmick, but Bakalar and Cliff Edwards of BusinessWeek thought otherwise. Edwards said that the camera's use in gameplay was a new opportunity for developers; Martin did not think that the concept would be widely adopted, as he believed it to be "a gimmick that would alienate [...] DS Lite owners". Eurogamer's Tom Bramwell speculated that the DSi follows Game & Watch and Game Boy creator Gunpei Yokoi's philosophy of using dated technology which developers are familiar with to introduce new game design concepts that are inexpensive enough for mass production at a profit. He argued its features are designed to "briefly entertain" early adopters while encouraging "developers to consider it as an alternative [of the DS Lite]" to build an attractive game library for the long term.

Because of the DSi's additions to the DS Lite design, critics recommended the console to those who had not purchased a previous DS model. (Note: According to CNET, PCWorld New Zealand, BusinessWeek, IGN, CNET UK, and the Los Angeles Times.) Pete Metzger of the Los Angeles Times considered the DSi to be "more like version 2.5 than a total reboot", but called its new features "worthwhile additions to an already great product." Gladstone gave the DSi a score of 75/100, and said that Nintendo "puts in smart nips and tucks to its already-svelte handheld while adding a raft of useful multimedia features." Harris and Lowe defined the console's hardware redesign as "evolutionary", rather than "revolutionary". After the DSi was unveiled, Goldman Sachs analyst Matthew J. Fassler called the DSi Shop a "tangible early threat" to big-box stores and retailers. Martin believed that the cameras and DSi Shop did not justify purchasing the DSi at launch, but, in line with the general consensus, saw potential in future software for the console. (Note: According to Bit-tech, Ars Technica, BusinessWeek, IGN, Eurogamer, and GameSpot.)

Douglas Rankine of Wired UK and McKinley Noble of GamePro thought previously existing Nintendo DS games were revitalized with the Nintendo DSi XL's larger screens; games like Scribblenauts and The World Ends with You benefited from increased touchscreen precision and increased legibility of text, respectively. CVG's Mike Jackson argued that the bigger screens, which made its unchanged resolution blockier, would probably be less noticeable to the older demographic for which the XL is undoubtedly designed. However, Jackson and IGN's Scott Lowe and Chris Burke agreed its clear and vivid colors considerably compensated for its unchanged resolution. Carol Mangis of PC Magazine thought families looking to share a handheld between members should consider a DSi XL, but the larger screens were not enough of an incentive for current DSi owners to upgrade. Lowe, Burke, Jackson, and Bakalar concluded the larger DSi model is not an essential upgrade; Jackson explained "if you tend not to carry it out with you, and only ever tend to use it at home, then the DSi XL is the better choice".

== See also ==
- Game Boy Micro — The last revision of Nintendo's previous handheld product line was also a size variation.
- Clamshell design
- List of handheld game consoles

== Notes and references ==
=== Bibliography ===
- Nintendo (2009). Nintendo DSi Instruction Manual (PDF). Nintendo Australia. Archived from the original (PDF) on July 6, 2011.
- Satoru Iwata (October 2, 2008). "Nintendo Conference Fall 2008". Nintendo. Archived from the original on May 1, 2009.
