= Nintendo Switch =

Hybrid video game console

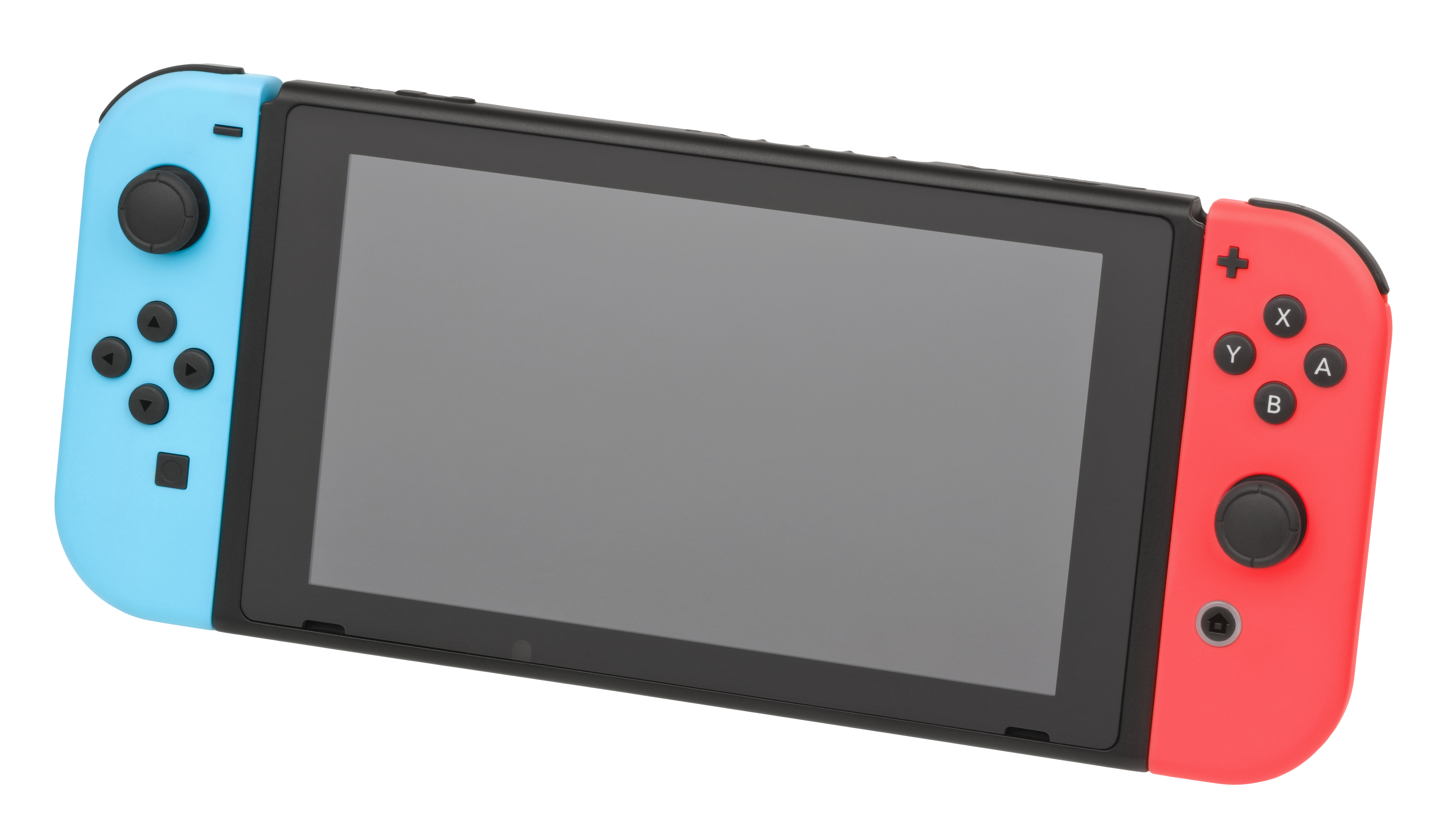
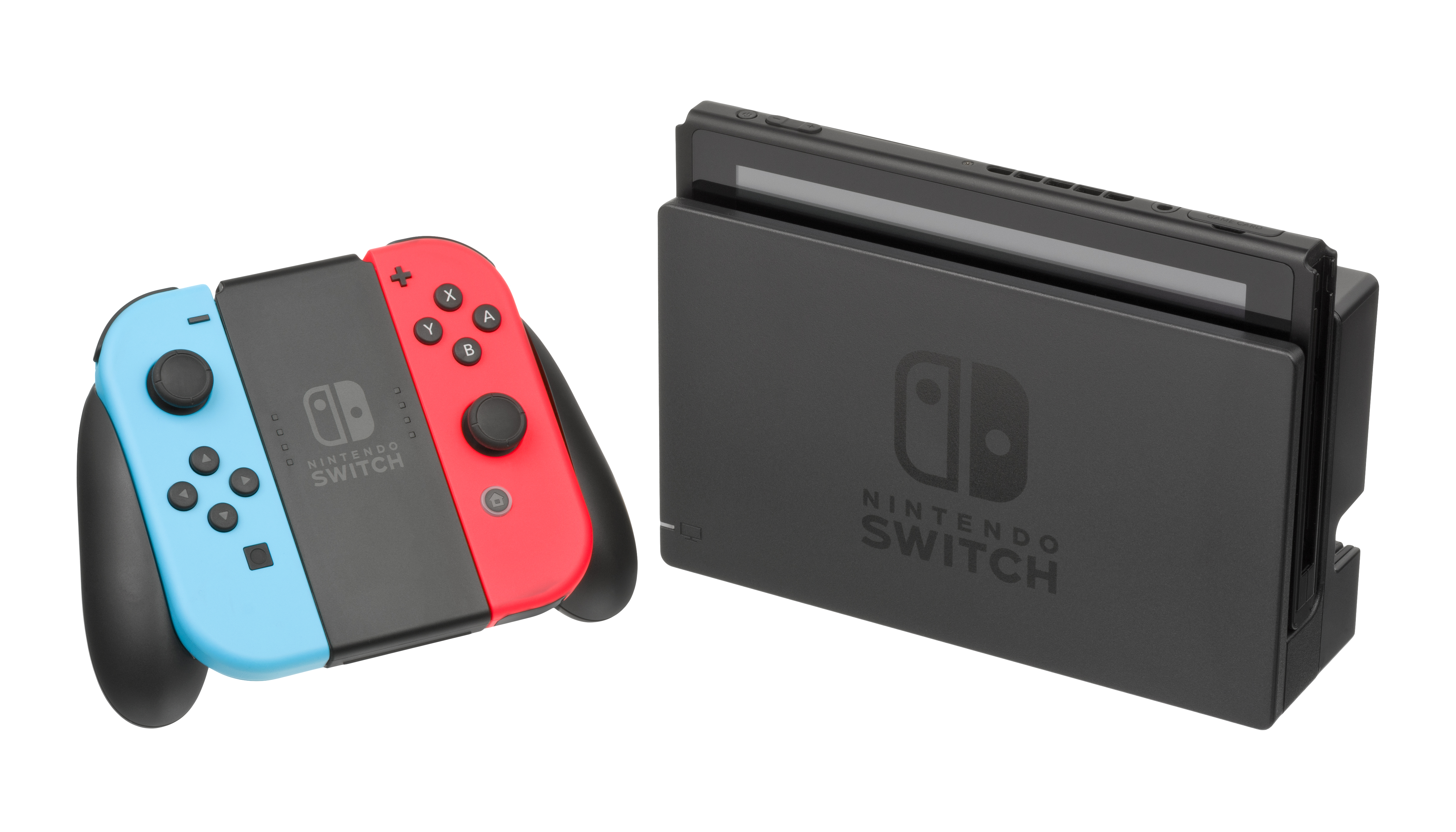
- Top: Console in "Handheld mode" with Joy-Con attached; Bottom: Console in "TV mode" with Joy-Con attached to a grip and the main unit docked
- Codename: NX · HAC (Nintendo); Odin (Nvidia)
- Developer: Nintendo PTD
- Manufacturer: Foxconn; Hosiden
- Type: Video game console
- Generation: Eighth/Ninth (Note: The Switch has been compared and considered to compete with consoles of both the eighth and ninth generation by sources.)
- Released: Original: March 3, 2017; Lite: September 20, 2019; OLED: October 8, 2021
- Introductory price: Original: US$299.99 · ¥29,980 · €329.99; Lite: US$199.99 · ¥19,980 · €229.99; OLED: US$349.99 · ¥37,980 · €349.99
- Discontinued: EU: February 2027; (Note: All models will be discontinued in Europe by mid-February 2027. In production in all other markets.)
- Units shipped: 157.20 million (Note: Original: 97.42 million; Lite: 26.27 million; OLED: 31.68 million) (as of 2026, details)
- Media: Game card; digital distribution
- Operating system: Nintendo Switch system software
- System on a chip: Nvidia Tegra X1 (Note: The HAC-001(-01) revision, Lite, and OLED model use the improved Tegra X1+)
- CPU: Quad-core ARM Cortex-A57 (Note: While the Tegra X1 SoC features 4 Cortex-A57 plus 4 Cortex-A53 CPU cores, the Nintendo Switch only uses the former, of which 1 is reserved for the operating system.) @ 1.02 GHz (Note: A temporary "boost mode" increases the CPU clock speed to 1.785 GHz. It is primarily used during loading.)
- Memory: 4 GB LPDDR4
- Storage: Original/Lite: 32 GB eMMC; OLED: 64 GB eMMC
- Removable storage: microSD, up to 2 TB
- Display: Original: 6.2-in, IPS (237 ppi), 720p; Lite: 5.5-in, IPS (267 ppi), 720p; OLED: 7-in, OLED (210 ppi), 720p; Docked: 480p/720p/1080p via HDMI
- Graphics: 256 Maxwell-based CUDA cores; Docked: 768 MHz, 393 GFLOPS; Undocked: 384 MHz, 197 GFLOPS (Note: The GPU is clocked at 768 MHz when the device is docked; in handheld mode, it fluctuates between 307.2 MHz, 384 MHz, and 460 MHz. When the CPU is in "boost mode", the GPU clock speed drops to 76.8 MHz.)
- Sound: Undocked: Linear PCM 2.0 ch stereo speakers (with pseudo-surround); Docked: Linear PCM 5.1 ch
- Input: Joy-Con; Nintendo Switch Pro Controller; Multi-touch touchscreen; Others; GameCube controller (with adapter); Joy-Con Wheel; Special NES controller; Special SNES controller; Special N64 controller; Special Genesis controller; Toy-Con; USB keyboard
- Connectivity: Wi-Fi 5 @ 2.4/5 GHz; Bluetooth 4.1; 1 × USB-C; Headphone jack; Dock; Nintendo Switch; 3 × USB 2.0; Nintendo Switch – OLED Model; 2 × USB 2.0; 1 x Ethernet
- Power: 3.7 V 15.95 Wh (4,310 mAh) Li-ion battery; Duration: 2.5–6.5 hours (Note: Original model)/4.5–9 hours (Note: HAC-001(-01) revision and OLED model); Charger: 7.5 W 5.0 V 1.5 A/39 W 15.0 V 2.6 A; Other models; Lite; 3.8 V 13.6 Wh (3,570 mAh) Li-ion battery; Duration: 3–7 hours
- Current firmware: 23.5.0 (November 9, 2026; 13 days ago) [±]
- Online services: Nintendo eShop; Nintendo Switch Online
- Dimensions: (In width x height x depth); Original: 173 × 102 × 14 mm (6.81 × 4.02 × 0.55 in) (Note: With Joy-Con attached: 238 × 102 × 14 mm (9.37 × 4.02 × 0.55 in), the depth from the tip of the analog sticks to the tip of the ZL/ZR buttons is 28 mm (1.1 in).); Lite: 208 × 91 × 14 mm (8.19 × 3.58 × 0.55 in); OLED: 176 × 102 × 14 mm (6.93 × 4.02 × 0.55 in) (Note: With Joy-Con attached: 242 × 102 × 14 mm (9.53 × 4.02 × 0.55 in), the depth from the tip of the analog sticks to the tip of the ZL/ZR buttons is 28 mm (1.1 in).)
- Weight: Original: 297 g (10.5 oz) (Note: With Joy-Con attached: 398 g (14.0 oz)); Lite: 277 g (9.8 oz); OLED: 319 g (11.3 oz) (Note: With Joy-Con attached: 420 g (15 oz))
- Best-selling game: Mario Kart 8 Deluxe (70.59 million, as of December 31, 2025) (list)
- Predecessor: Nintendo 3DS; Wii U
- Successor: Nintendo Switch 2
- Website: nintendo.com/switch

The Nintendo Switch (Note: Japanese: ニンテンドースイッチ, Hepburn: Nintendō Suitchi; Nintendo branded the console in Japan in its English name.) is a video game console developed by Nintendo and released worldwide in most regions on March 3, 2017. Released in the middle of the eighth generation of home consoles, the Switch succeeded the Wii U and competed with Sony's PlayStation 4 and Microsoft's Xbox One; it also competes with the ninth-generation consoles, the PlayStation 5 and Xbox Series X/S.

The Switch is a tablet that can either be docked for home console use or used as a portable device, making it a hybrid console. Its wireless Joy-Con controllers function as two halves of a standard controller and alternatively as individual controllers, featuring buttons, directional analog sticks for user input, motion sensing, and tactile feedback. A pair can attach to the sides of the console for handheld play, attach to a grip accessory to provide the form of a separated gamepad, or be used unattached. The system software supports online gaming through internet connectivity, as well as local wireless ad hoc connectivity with other consoles. Switch games and software are available on physical flash-based ROM cartridges and digital distribution via Nintendo eShop; the system has no region lockout. Two hardware revisions were released: the handheld-only Switch Lite, released on September 20, 2019; and a higher-end version featuring an OLED screen, released on October 8, 2021.

The Switch was unveiled on October 20, 2016; the concept came about following Nintendo's financial losses from poor Wii U sales and market competition from mobile games. Nintendo's then-president Satoru Iwata pushed the company towards mobile gaming and novel hardware. The Switch's design was aimed at a wide demographic of players through multiple modes of use. Nintendo preemptively sought the support of many third-party developers and publishers, as well as independent studios, to help build the game library alongside its first-party games. Standard electronic components, such as a chipset based on Nvidia's Tegra line, were chosen to make game development easier for programmers and more compatible with existing game engines.

The Switch received positive reviews, with praise for its innovative concept, intuitive design, and software library, but criticism for certain hardware and controller issues. It became a major commercial success; with over 155 million units shipped worldwide as of December 2025, it is the second-best-selling console, behind the PlayStation 2, and the best-selling Nintendo console. The Nintendo Switch 2, which is backward compatible with most Switch games, was released on June 5, 2025.

== History ==
=== Background ===
While Nintendo enjoyed record revenues, net sales, and profits in 2009 as a result of the recent releases of the Nintendo DS and Wii (in 2004 and 2006 respectively), its revenues soon declined. The company posted its first loss as a video game company in 2012 prior to the Wii U's introduction that year; Nintendo had similar losses in the following years, due to the console's poor reception. The New York Times attributed Nintendo lowering financial forecasts in 2014 to weak hardware sales against mobile gaming. Previously, the company was hesitant about this market, with then-president Satoru Iwata considering that to take part would cause it to "cease to be Nintendo" and lose its identity. About three years prior to the Switch's announcement, Iwata, Tatsumi Kimishima, Genyo Takeda, and Shigeru Miyamoto crafted a strategy for revitalizing Nintendo's business model, which included approaching the mobile market, creating new hardware, and "maximizing [its] intellectual property". Iwata was able to secure a business alliance with Japanese mobile provider DeNA before his death. The deal developed mobile games based on Nintendo's first-party franchises, believing this approach would not compromise their integrity. Following Iwata's death in July 2015, Kimishima was named as president of Nintendo, while Miyamoto was promoted to the title of "Creative Fellow".

=== Development ===
The initial conception for the Switch started shortly after the release of the Wii U in 2012. Kimishima stated that when Nintendo was evaluating what new hardware it wanted to produce, it "didn't just want a successor" to either the Nintendo 3DS or Wii U, but instead asked "what kind of new experience can we create?" In an interview with The Asahi Shimbun, Kimishima said that the Switch was designed to provide a "new way to play" that would "have a larger impact than the Wii U". Nintendo of America president and COO Reggie Fils-Aimé emphasized the console's appeal as a device that would provide gamers the option to play at home or on the go and noted that it would enable developers to create new types of games. This approach continued Nintendo's blue ocean strategy for the competitive console marketplace: rather than compete feature for feature with the other consoles, it would establish unique and difficult-to-copy devices. Miyamoto said that some broad concepts of the Switch extend from the "lateral thinking with seasoned technology" design philosophy of Gunpei Yokoi that Nintendo has used over the last couple of decades.

The commercial failure of the Wii U also pressured Nintendo towards developing the Switch. Early sales of the Wii U were weak compared to the Wii, prompting major third-party publishers like Electronic Arts and Ubisoft to rescind their support of the console near the end of its first year. According to Fils-Aimé, when it became apparent that the Wii U would underperform relative to the company's expectations, the Switch became a "make or break product" for Nintendo.

The design of the Switch was aimed to bridge the polarization of the gaming market at the time, creating a device that could play "leisurely" video games along with those intended to be played "deeply", according to Shinya Takahashi and Yoshiaki Koizumi, general manager and deputy general manager of Nintendo's Entertainment Planning & Development Division (EPD) respectively. This approach also would apply to the cultural lifestyle and gaming differences between Japanese and Western players; Japanese players tend to play on the go and with social groups, while Western players tend to play at home by themselves. The design of the Switch would meet both cultures, and certain games, like 1-2-Switch, could potentially make social gaming more acceptable in Western culture. Two key elements that were set to address this mixed market were the ability for the unit to play either on a television screen or as a portable and the use of detachable controllers. The "Switch" name was selected not only to refer to the console's ability to switch from handheld to home console modes, but to present "the idea of being a 'switch' that will flip and change the way people experience entertainment in their daily lives".

Part of the inspiration of the Switch's form and design was from feedback players had given Nintendo on the Wii Remote, according to Shinya Takahashi. With the release of games like Wii Sports and Wii Fit, players had asked Nintendo if they could make the Wii Remote in a smaller form factor, potentially strapped to a part of their body. This led to Nintendo envisioning what a smaller form-factor controller could provide in both hardware and gameplay, and it led to the idea of a console that was small enough with these new controllers to also be portable. Other concepts came out of critical consumer feedback of the Wii U. Fils-Aimé said that one common criticism for the Wii U was that while players did enjoy using the Wii U GamePad, it became functionless if they moved a distance away from the main console. This prompted Nintendo to design a home console that a player could take anywhere. Around five different prototypes were developed for the Switch before Nintendo decided upon a finalized design. Variations included developing different methods of how the Joy-Con controllers would physically connect to the console, such as using magnets to hold them in place.

In addition to the form-factor design, Nintendo needed to balance the power and speed of the console's central processing unit with battery life and the unit's size, coupled with limited development resources and deadlines set by Nintendo's management. One choice made by the development team was to use an existing system on a chip (SOC) rather than creating its own, as done on previous consoles. Koizumi said that this break from tradition was done to gain more third-party support for the console by using an SOC to which developers could easily port games. Nintendo was not focused on raw processing power but instead sought to balance the overall features of the system, including battery life and size, keeping in mind its limited development resources and timeline. Koizumi said, "The most difficult part was on how to take an overall balance while we were getting entangled with all of those in complexity." To achieve this balance, they did not opt to use the more powerful hardware they could have used, instead using a middle-ground approach to achieve their vision of the Switch.

Koizumi served as the general producer of the Switch during its development. According to Miyamoto, the Switch's development within Nintendo was headed by younger employees, with him saying "it's really been them that have put this forward and designed this system". Miyamoto said of the younger employees: "I always look for designers who aren't super-passionate game fans. I make it a point to ensure they're not just a gamer, but that they have a lot of different interests and skill sets." Junior developers were also used to help brainstorm ideas of how to make sure the Switch had a longer lifecycle beyond the typical five-to-six years as most other consoles had. Miyamoto, Takeda, and Iwata were less involved, but provided necessary oversight on the Switch's development principally around the cost of implementing new features that would make the Switch stand out. For Miyamoto, his limited involvement allowed him to spend more time on Nintendo games being developed at the time, such as Super Mario Run.

=== Announcements ===
The first public news about the Switch's hardware happened alongside the announcement of Nintendo and DeNA's partnership on March 17, 2015. At this stage, Nintendo referred to the console under the codename "NX" and described it as a "brand new concept". At an investor's meeting in April 2016, Nintendo announced that it planned to release the NX worldwide in March 2017. While Nintendo did not unveil the NX's hardware at E3 2016 in June, it did announce that The Legend of Zelda: Breath of the Wild, which was originally announced as a Wii U-exclusive, would also be released for the NX. At a Nintendo shareholders' meeting following the conference, Miyamoto stated that the company had concerns that competitors could copy ideas from the NX if they were revealed too soon. The following month, rumors began to surface surrounding the nature of the console, including its use of Nvidia Tegra hardware, being a "hybrid" device intended for both home and mobile use, controllers that could detach from the main device and be played separately, and that Nintendo would distribute games on the console via cartridges and digital downloads.

On October 20, 2016, Nintendo officially announced the console under the name Nintendo Switch, alongside a trailer that demonstrated the hardware's nature as a hybrid device. At the time of the trailer's release, Nintendo did not provide many details on features of the platform, though it planned to have events the following year to provide more details about the console. The company stated that there were additional features that were not presented in the introductory trailer. Miyamoto and Fils-Aimé presented the Switch to host Jimmy Fallon on a broadcast of The Tonight Show Starring Jimmy Fallon in December 2016. In addition to showing more of the console's hardware and functionality, Fallon was given the opportunity to play part of Breath of the Wild live.

Nintendo revealed technical details of the Switch, including its worldwide launch date and price, at a press event in Tokyo on January 13, 2017. The event was livestreamed, with an English voiceover provided by Nintendo of America through its broadcast and regional Twitter accounts relaying details in other languages. A Nintendo Treehouse event occurred the following day to reveal the full launch lineup and upcoming games for the Switch.

=== Launch ===
The Switch was officially released on March 3, 2017, in Japan, most English-speaking and Western markets and in the United Arab Emirates. It was released with an MSRP of ¥29,980 in Japan, US$299.99 in the United States, £279.99 in the United Kingdom, and A$469.95 in Australia; with pricing for the European market varying. The set included a Switch console, a dock, left and right Joy-Con controllers and accompanying straps, a Joy-Con grip, an AC power adapter, and an HDMI cable. There were two Switch bundles available at launch, one with grey Joy-Con and one with neon red and blue Joy-Con. Nintendo feared that a higher price would harm sales, which prompted it to not include any additional hardware or games.

==== Global rollout ====
The Switch continued to be officially released in particular markets over the next few years, such as in Argentina on August 15, 2017, and in South Korea and Taiwan on December 1. In April 2018, CD Media, Nintendo's official distributor in Greece and the Balkans since 2016, announced after opening its new offices in Istanbul, that Nintendo's products would officially be distributed in Turkey later in the year. Nintendo abruptly withdrew from the Turkish market back in June 2012 when then-distributor Nortec Eurasia closed. CD Media released the Nintendo Switch in Turkey in July 2018. Nintendo's Singapore-based distributor, Maxsoft, officially launched the Nintendo Switch in the Philippines on November 30, 2018, in Thailand on March 29, 2019, and in Malaysia on January 17, 2020. In early 2019, Nintendo of Europe signed a partnership with Tel Aviv-based distributor TorGaming Ltd., making it Nintendo's official distributor in Israel and launched its products in the market, including the Nintendo Switch, on March 1, 2019. Nintendo's Dubai-based distributor, Active Gulf, officially launched the Nintendo Switch in Oman on September 27, 2019. The company had previously broken the street date for the Emirati release of the console, with retailers in the region distributing it as early as February 28, 2017. In Ukraine, the console was released by ERC on November 9, 2021.

Although the Nintendo Switch was not officially released in China prior to December 2019, it was widely available in the country due to grey market imports from Hong Kong and other regions, such as Japan. In January 2018, former Nintendo president Tatsumi Kimishima said in an interview with Chinese news website QQ that Nintendo has tried to release the Switch in China but has been unable to do so. Nintendo partnered with Tencent in April 2019 to gain the necessary approvals to release the Switch in China, along with a test version of New Super Mario Bros. U Deluxe; it was released on December 10, 2019, at a base price of CN¥2,099 or about US$298. Tencent continues to help Nintendo bring other Switch games through China's approval process via National Radio and Television Administration. In addition, Tencent helped localize various games and help implement the Nintendo Switch Online service within the country, integrating its offerings with the WeChat payment systems.

Nintendo had exited the Brazilian market in 2015 due to high tariffs, but independent resellers sold the console there from March 2017 onward. Nintendo had since assigned NC Games as its local game distributor in May 2017, and the local company committed to sell some officially imported Nintendo Switch units in small quantities. NC Games silently went defunct about 2019, however, and in August 2020, Nintendo affirmed that it would restart imports directly into Brazil, for release on September 18, 2020.

=== Post-launch and special editions ===
Numerous special-edition models and bundles have been released, including those for Splatoon 2, the 2018 Black Friday shopping day, Animal Crossing: New Horizons and Fortnite. The Japan-exclusive "2nd Unit Set" released in May 2018 on the My Nintendo Store at a reduced price of ¥24,980, was positioned towards households which already owned a Switch. It did not include a dock, AC adapter, HDMI cable, and grip.

By February 2021, about four years from the console's release, Nintendo president Shuntaro Furukawa said that "The Switch is in the middle of its life cycle". In July 2024, the Switch became Nintendo's longest-running console without a replacement system, surpassing the seven-year period for the NES.

The Switch Lite launched on September 20, 2019, in three colors: yellow, grey, and turquoise. The system was promoted alongside The Legend of Zelda: Link's Awakening, a remake of the 1993 Game Boy game. A special Pokémon Sword and Pokémon Shield branded version of the Switch Lite, themed around the Pokémon Zacian and Zamazenta, launched on November 8, 2019, a week before the game's release. A coral color was released on March 20, 2020, in Japan, and on April 3 in the rest of the world. A blue color released on May 7, 2021, in Europe, and on May 21 in the rest of the world. A special Pokémon Dialga and Palkia limited edition was released on November 5, 2021, 14 days before the release of Pokémon Brilliant Diamond and Shining Pearl. This special edition pays homage to the Nintendo DS Lite Dialga and Palkia edition. On September 26, 2024, a special gold colored edition of the Switch Lite based on The Legend of Zelda was released on September 26 to coincide with the release of The Legend of Zelda: Echoes of Wisdom. These units also came bundled with a 12-month membership to Nintendo Switch Online + Expansion Pack.

Due to tariffs by the Trump administration in 2025, Nintendo increased the price of the Switch, the Switch Lite and the Switch OLED in the United States by about $50 on August 3, 2025, and stated they may be raising the prices for games, accessories and the Nintendo Switch Online subscription price in the future.

=== Discontinuation ===
Nintendo announced in July 2026 that it will discontinue sales of the Switch console family (not including Switch 2 units) in Europe as of February 2027. This came at the same time that Nintendo announced they will start rolling out new versions of the Switch 2 consoles with user-replaceable batteries across Europe to meet with right to repair regulations. Nintendo affirmed this discontinuation only affected Europe, and will continue to distribute the Switch to other regions for the foreseeable future.

== Hardware ==
The Nintendo Switch is a hybrid video game console that consists of a console unit, a dock, and two Joy-Con controllers. Nintendo has described the system as "a home console that you can take with you on the go". While the company has avoided characterizing the Switch as a direct successor to the Wii U or Nintendo 3DS, it has effectively taken over their role as Nintendo's home and handheld console. The Wii U was discontinued shortly before the Switch's 2017 launch, while the 3DS remained in production until 2020, positioned as an entry-level option for younger players.

=== Console ===
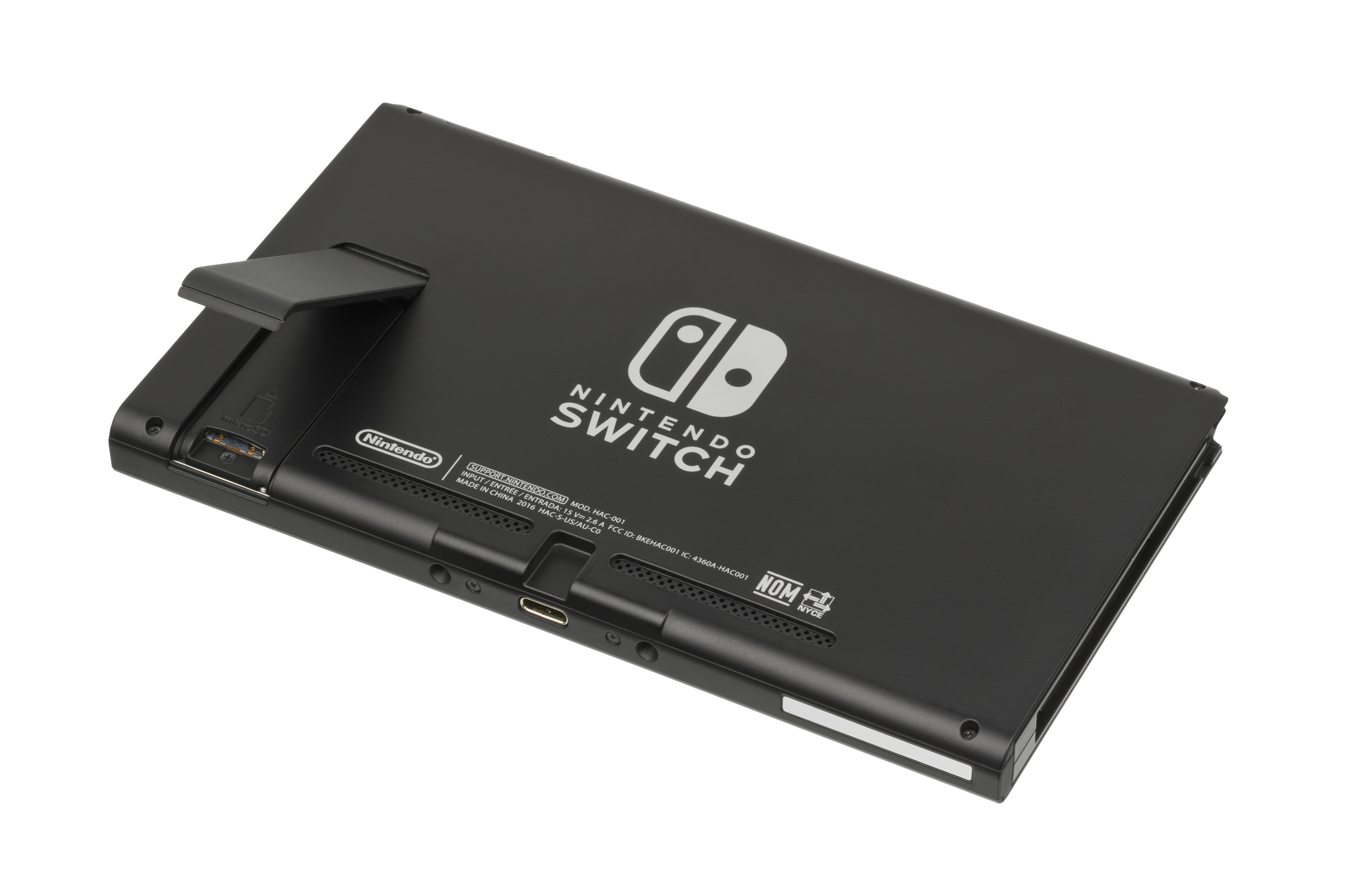
Back of a Nintendo Switch (without controllers), showing the kickstand, MicroSD slot and charging port. The Joy-Con slotting mechanism is visible on the short side.

View of the hardware inside the console from the back

The core component of the Nintendo Switch is the console unit, a battery-powered tablet featuring a 6.2-inch (160 mm) LCD touchscreen, the same size as the Wii U GamePad. It measures 173 millimeters (6.8 in) in width, 102 mm (4 in) in height, and 14 mm (0.55 in) in depth, and weighs 297 grams (10.5 oz). The display supports 720p resolution (1280×720 px) with ten-point multi-touch capacitive sensing and haptic technology from Immersion Corporation.

The unit includes a 3.5 mm audio jack, stereo speakers on the bottom edge, a USB-C charging port, and a rear. A game card slot is located on the top edge, and a microSD card slot is located beneath the kickstand. Volume controls and the power button are also positioned on the top, while side rails allow Joy-Con controllers to attach. An ambient light sensor adjusts screen brightness automatically.

The Switch supports three gameplay modes: "TV mode", where the console is docked to output to a television; "Tabletop mode", where the kickstand allows for shared play on a flat surface; and "Handheld mode", where the console is used as a traditional portable device. Switching between modes is seamless—users simply dock or undock the console, adjust the kickstand, and attach or detach the Joy-Con controllers. Some games are designed for specific modes; for instance, Voez initially required touchscreen controls and lacked TV mode support until a 2018 update, while Super Mario Party does not support Handheld mode.

Nintendo describes the Switch as a "single-screen experience", displaying content either on the console when undocked or on a TV when docked. Unlike the Wii U's GamePad, it does not support dual-screen functionality.

Nintendo patented a method for linking multiple Switch consoles to form a multi-monitor setup, first utilized in Super Mario Party to create an extended gameplay environment.

=== Dock ===
The Nintendo Switch console can be placed into the Switch dock, a docking station that charges the console and outputs video and audio to a television. The dock includes two USB 2.0 Type-A ports on the left side. Under a rear cover that conceals the ports are one USB 3.0 Type-A port, one USB-C port (for power only), and one HDMI port. The dock included with the OLED model replaces the USB 3.0 Type-A port with an Ethernet port for wired network connectivity.

When docked, the console supports resolutions up to 1080p at up to 60 frames per second, though actual performance varies by game.

The dock measures 173 millimeters (6.8 in) in width, 104 mm (4.1 in) in height, and 54 mm (2.1 in) in depth, and weighs 327 grams (11.5 oz). The version included with the OLED model is larger and features a revised housing.

Nintendo Switch dock
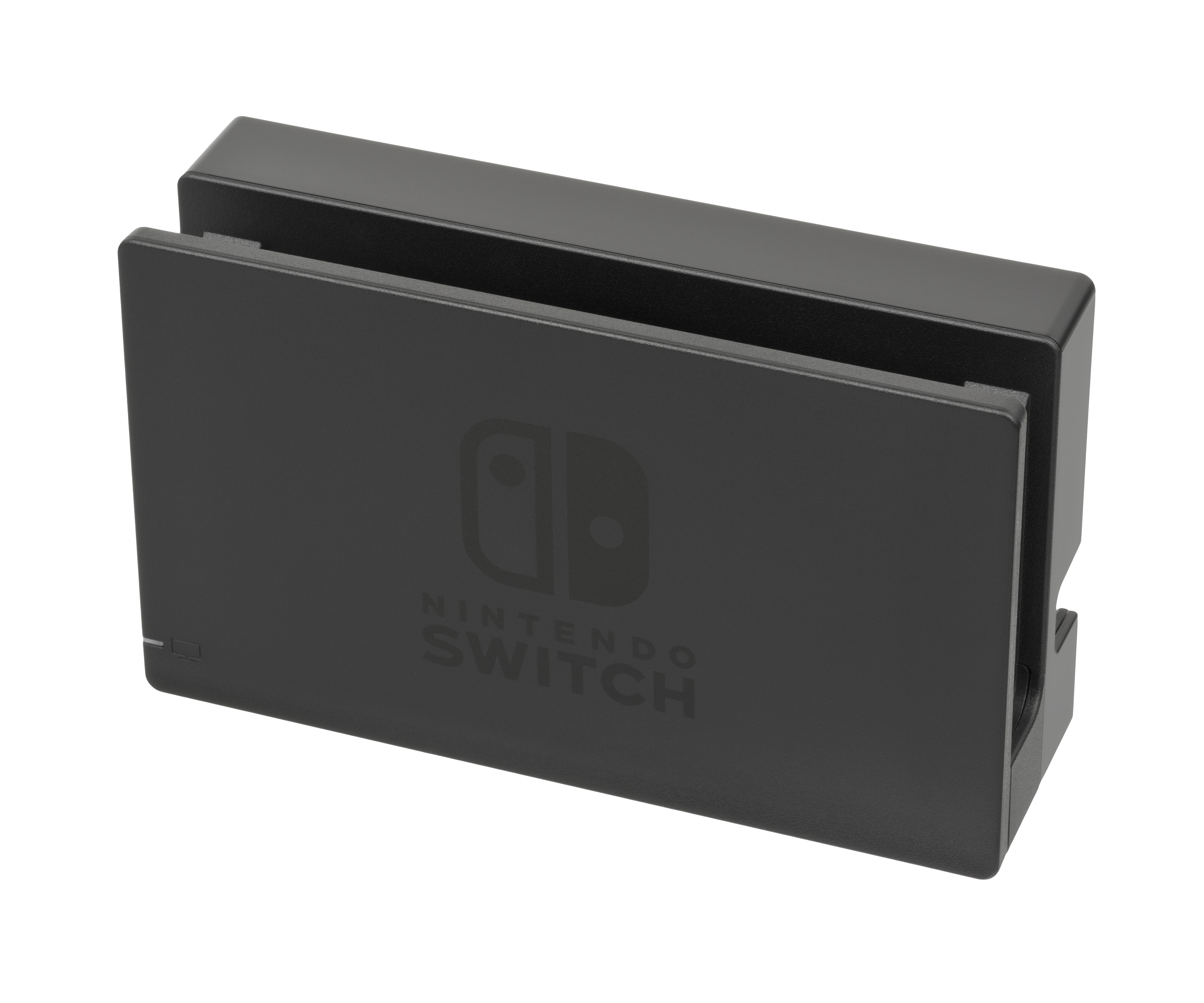
Front of the dock. The Switch console is inserted from the top.

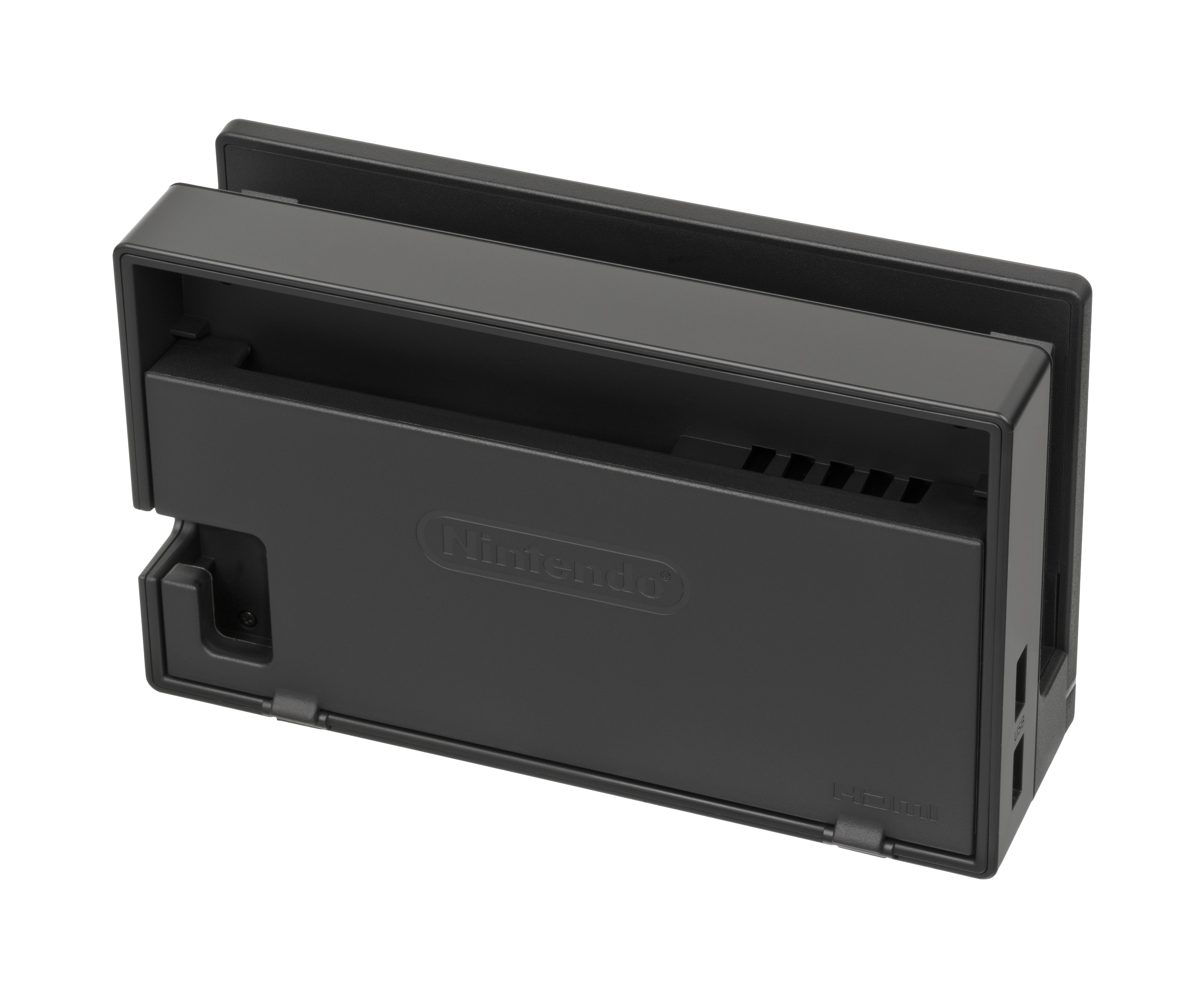
Back of the dock, showing its two USB ports on the right side

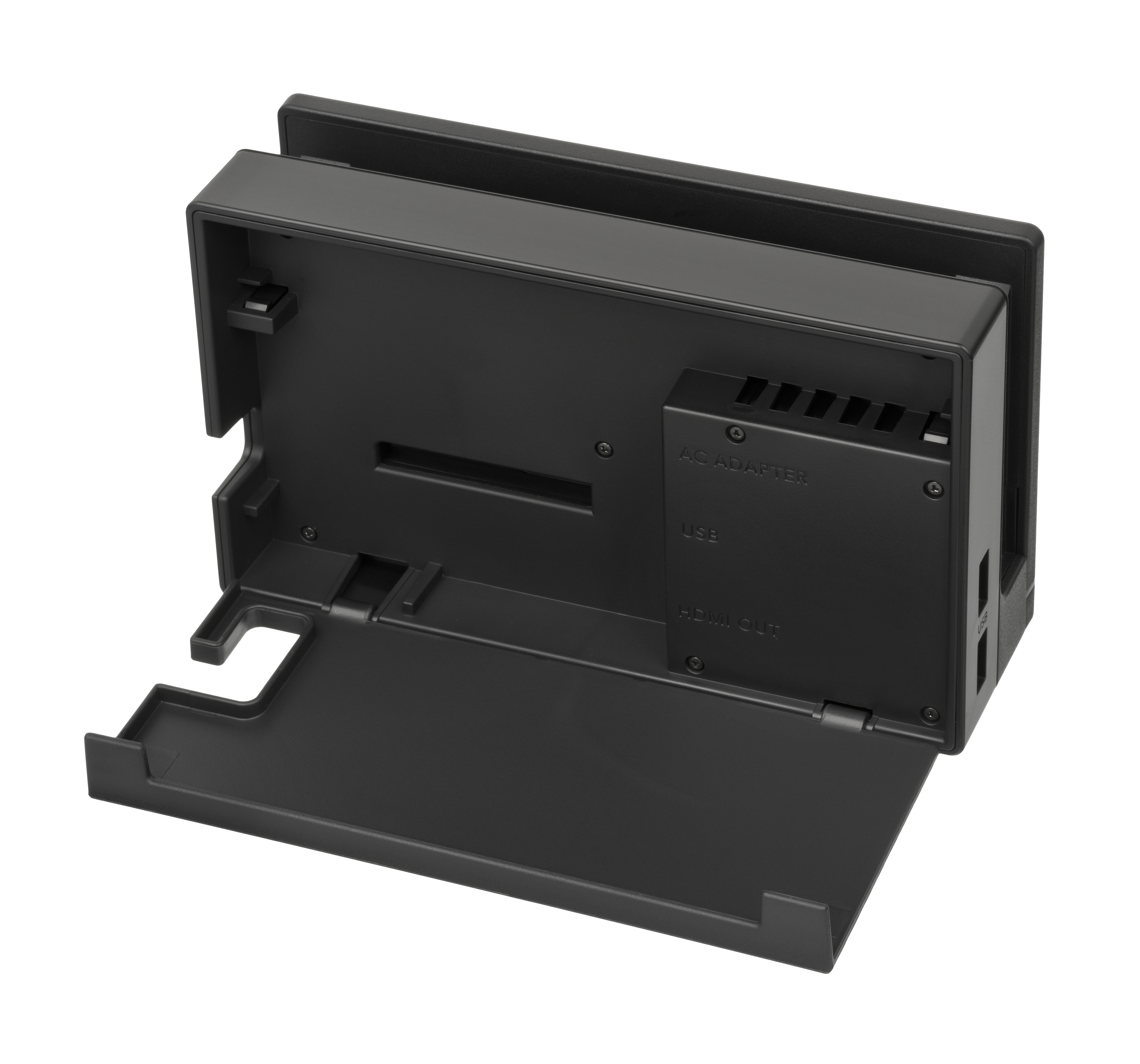
Back of the dock, opened. A USB-C AC adapter and HDMI cable must be connected for TV gameplay. There is an additional USB 3.0 port inside.

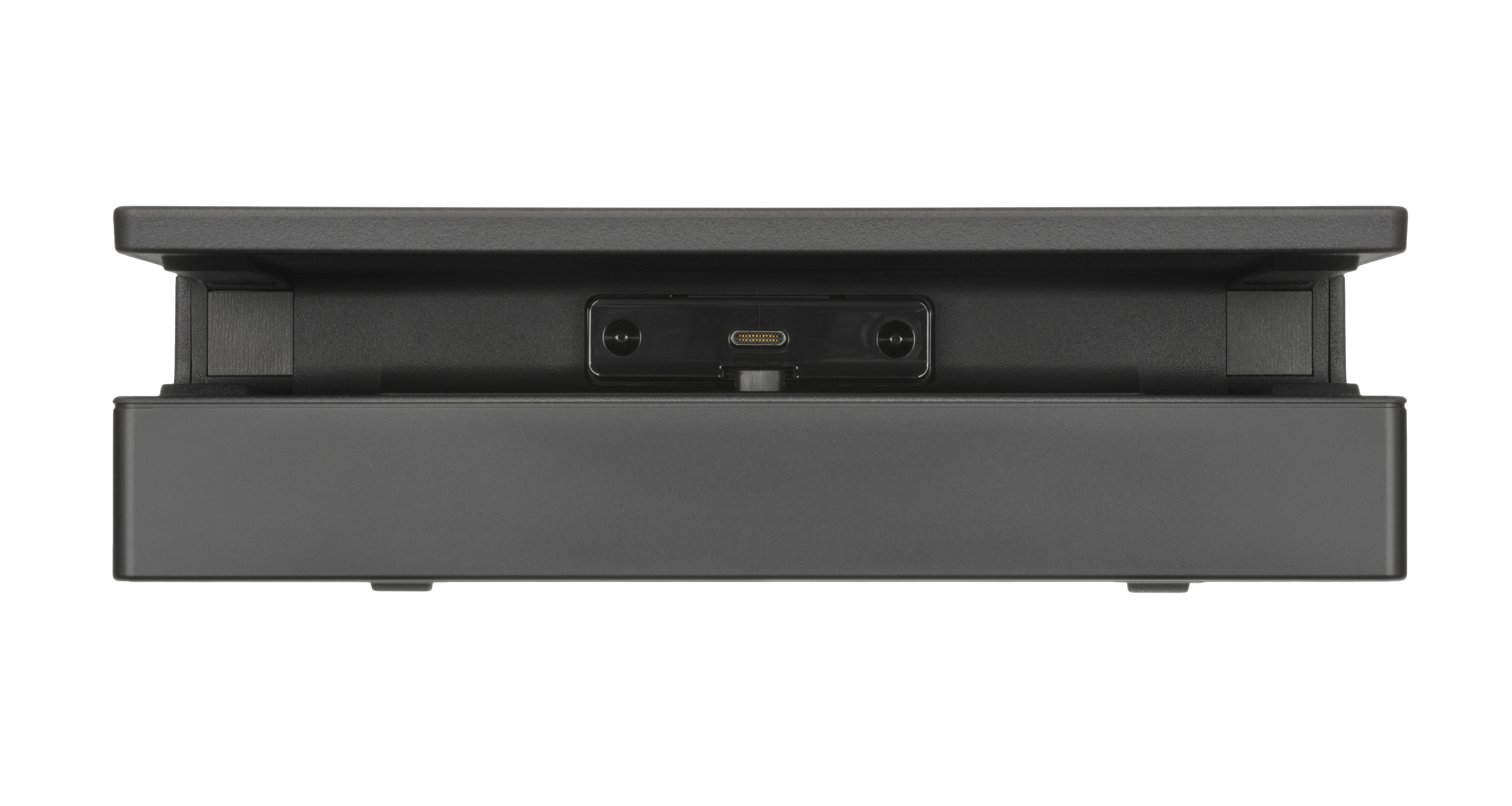
Top of the dock, featuring a USB-C male port that connects to the console

=== Controllers ===
==== Joy-Con ====
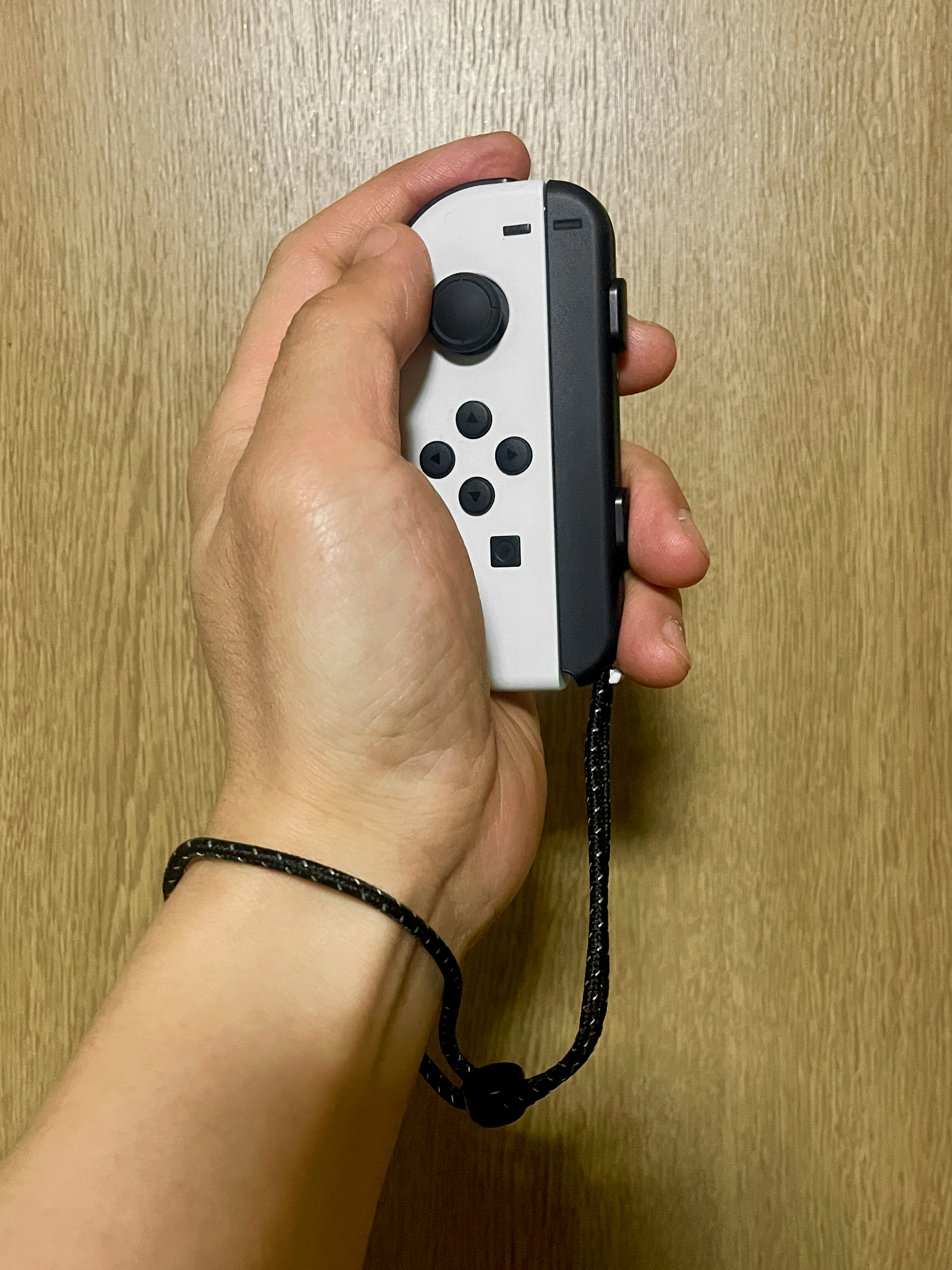
Joy-Con on strap

The Nintendo Switch includes two controllers, collectively called Joy-Con and individually referred to as the "Joy-Con (L)" and "Joy-Con (R)". The controllers attach to the console via side rails with a locking mechanism, and a release button on the rear allows detachment. When attached to the console, the Joy-Con recharge automatically.

When detached, the controllers can be used in several configurations: together using a grip accessory to form a traditional gamepad-style controller, separately as miniature gamepads for two-player input, or individually as motion controllers. Straps can be attached for improved handling when used separately.

A single Switch console supports up to eight Joy-Con connections simultaneously.

Nintendo offers versions of the charging grip that allows connected controllers to charge via USB-C, as well as straps with which can be used with a AA battery for use when the controllers are not regularly attached to the console.

Standard Switch controllers
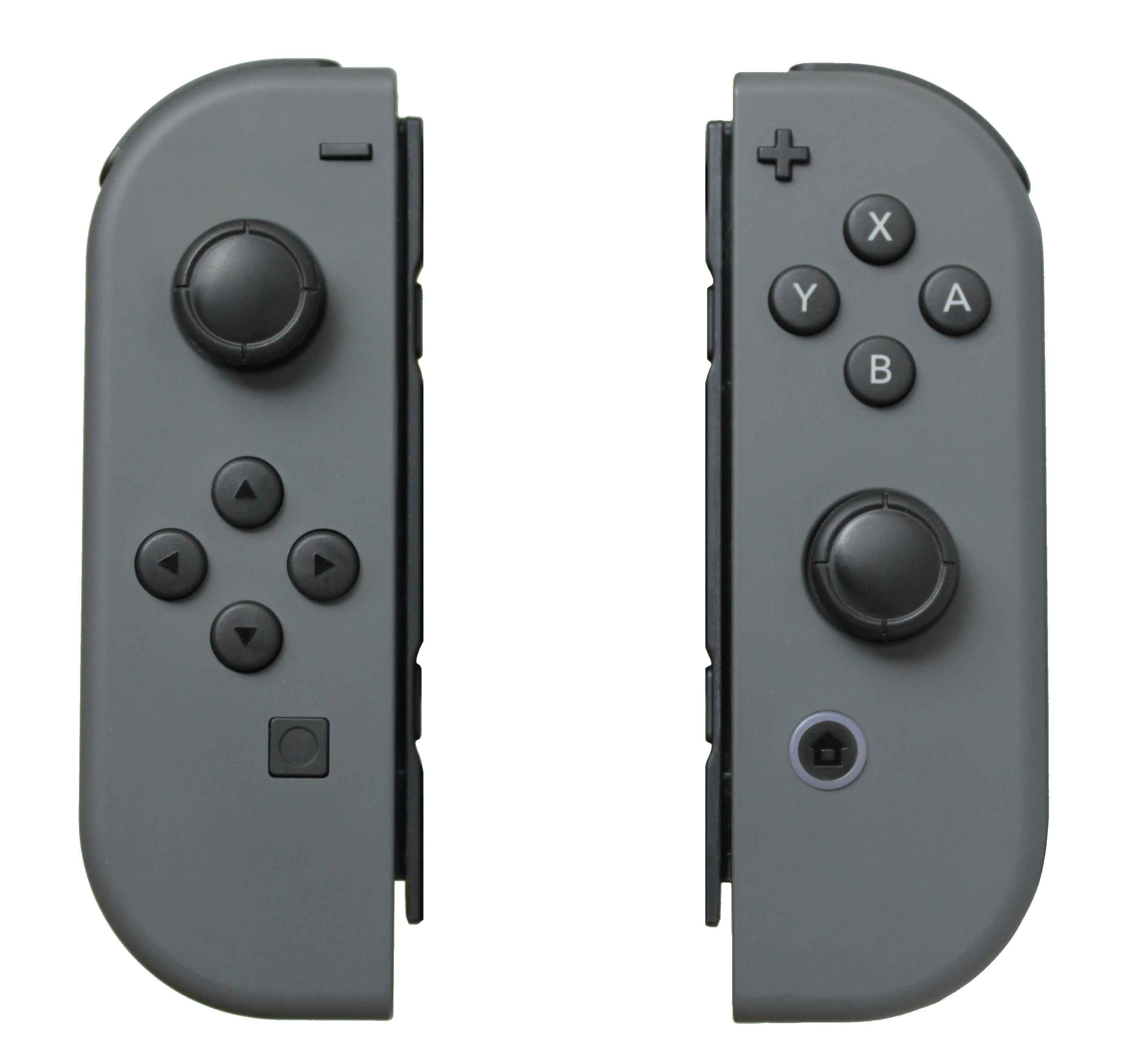
The gray Joy-Con (L) and Joy-Con (R) controllers. The inside rails slot onto the side of the main Switch console or grip controller.

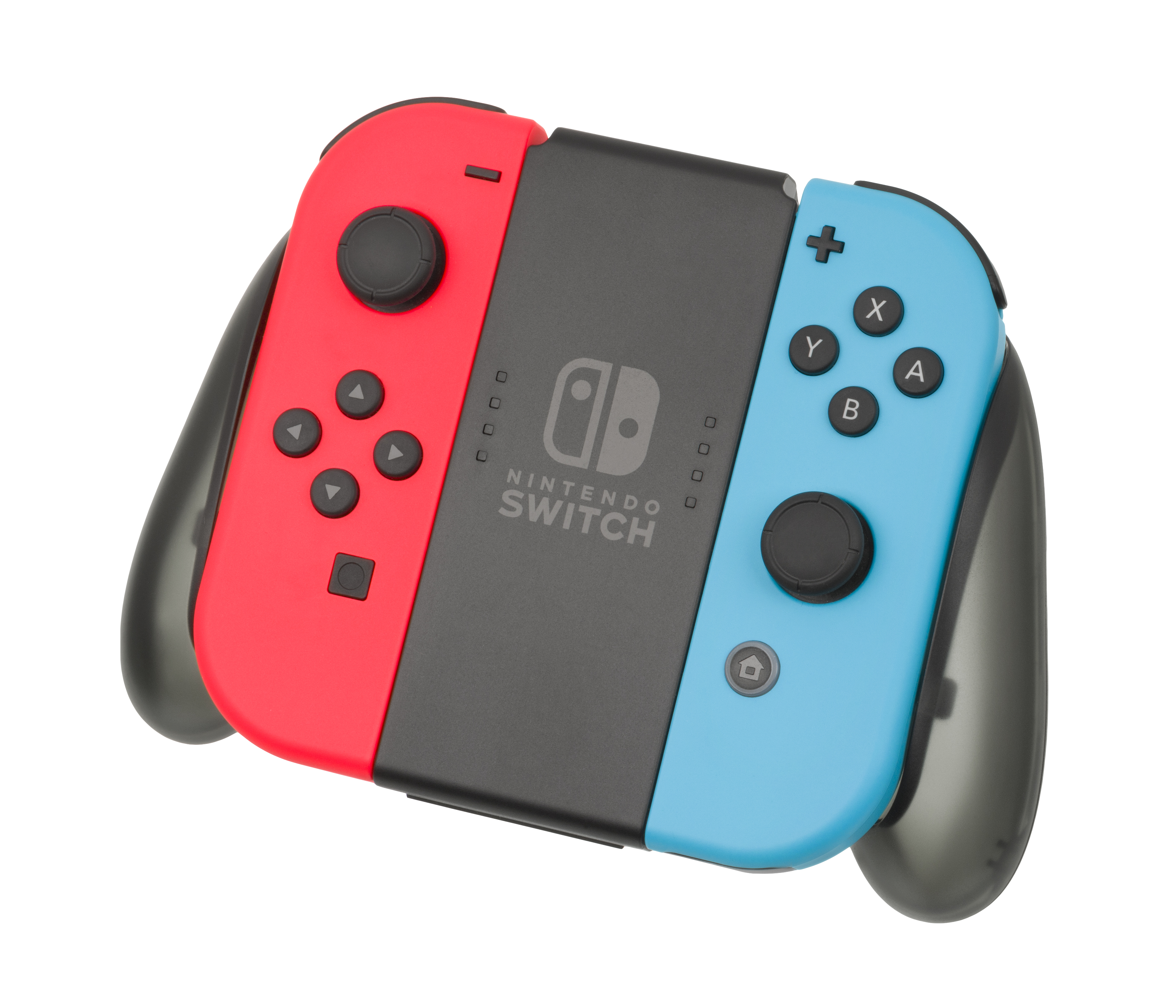
Red and blue Joy-Con slotted onto the charging grip, giving the general proportions of a standard controller

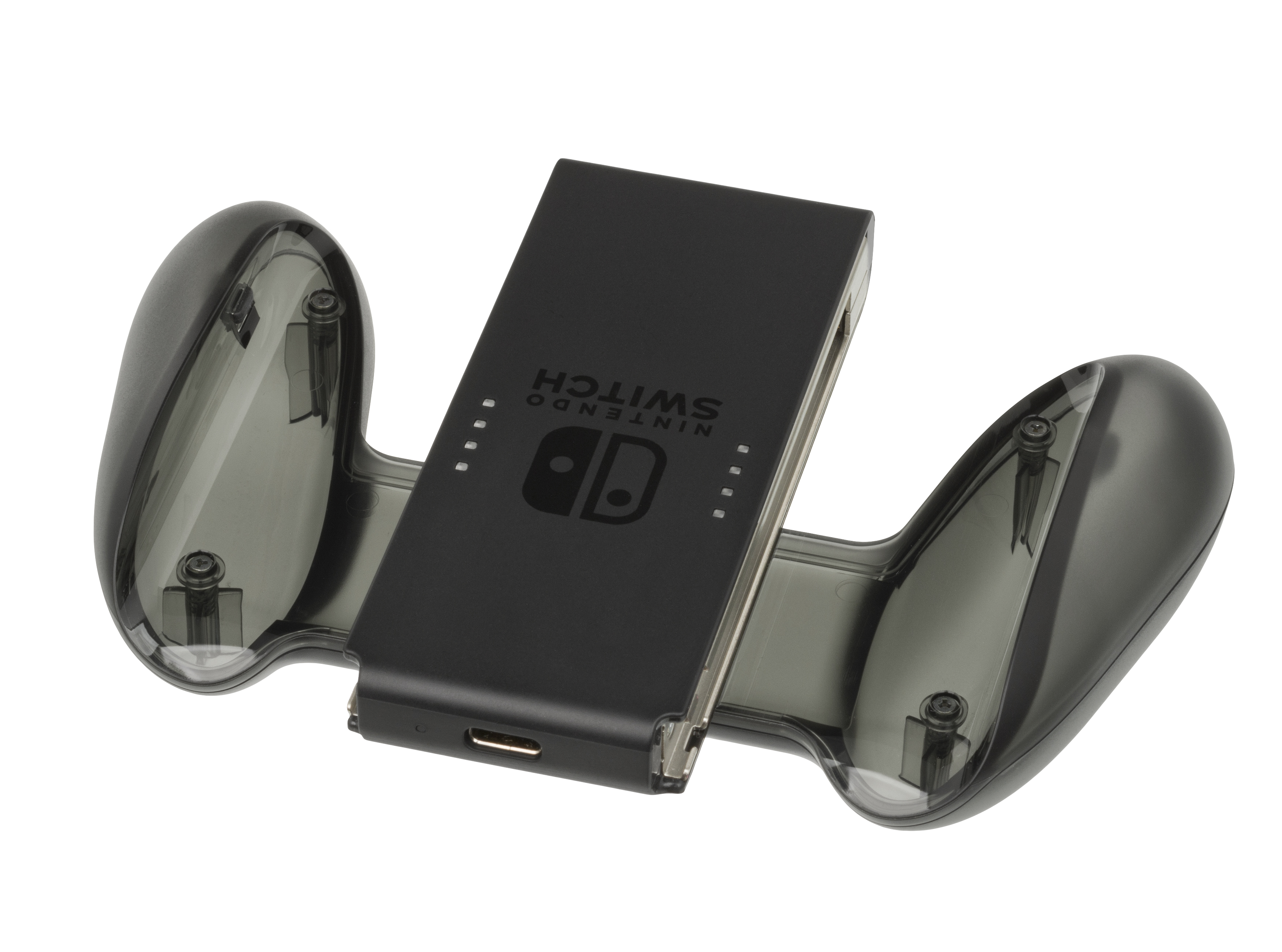
The top of the charging grip, showing the USB-C port

==== Pro Controller ====
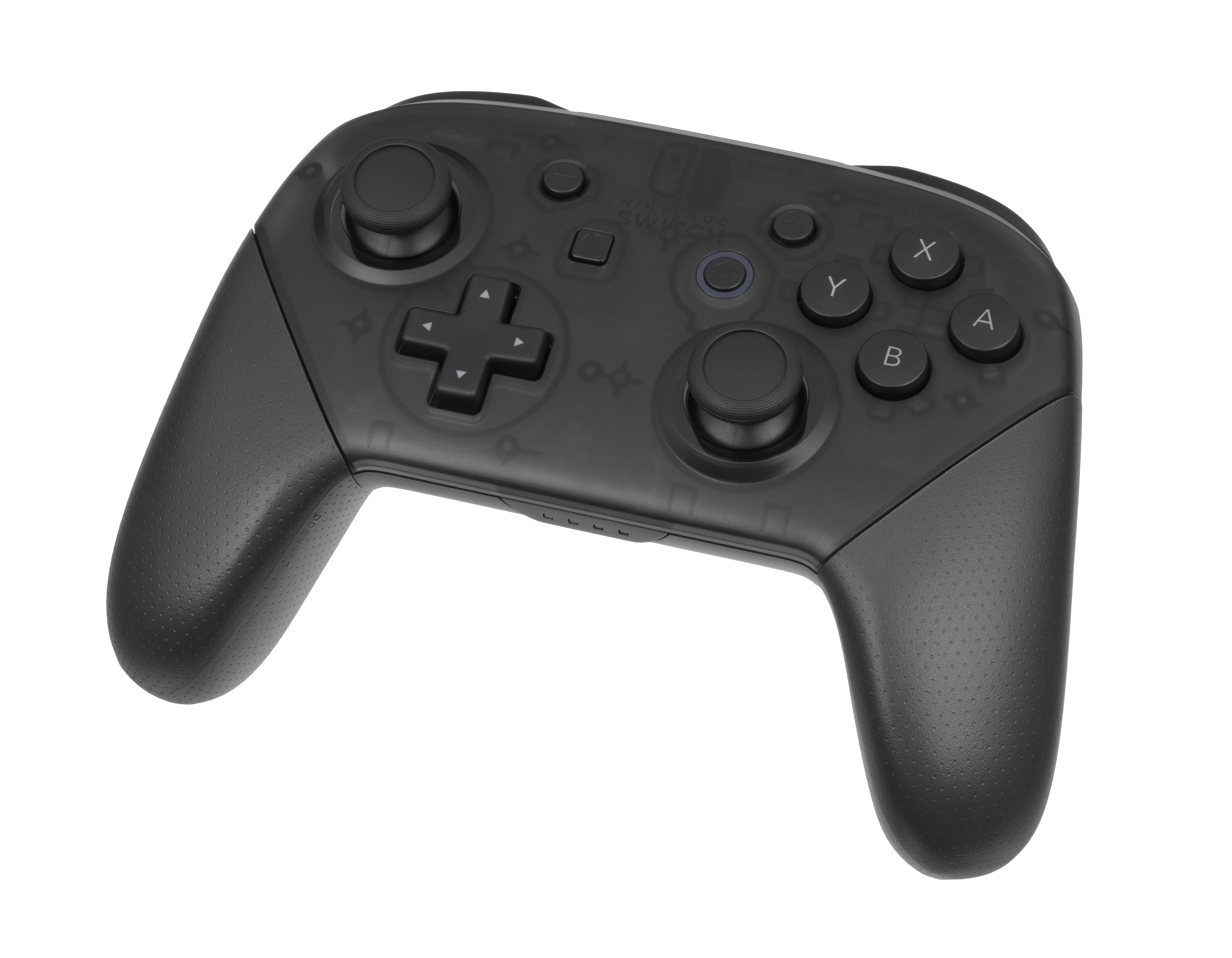
The optional and more conventional Pro Controller

The Nintendo Switch Pro Controller is a separate wireless controller that offers a more traditional design, resembling the Wii Classic Controller Pro and Wii U Pro Controller. It connects to the Switch via Bluetooth and charges through a USB-C port.

==== Other ====
The Nintendo Switch supports a wide array of additional accessories, according to Kimishima. Kimishima suggested that the Switch is part of a large ecosystem of devices, though the Switch unit remains the core console element. Takahashi suggested the possibility of other units besides the Joy-Con that could attach and/or connect to the console to serve as alternate input devices and change how the Switch can be used.

Nintendo offers a Joy-Con Wheel, a small steering wheel-like unit that a Joy-Con can slot into, allowing it to be used for racing games such as Mario Kart 8 Deluxe. Standalone docks are available, which include a power adapter and HDMI cable. Third parties also support the Switch with additional accessories, such as carrying cases and screen protectors. The 4.0.0 system update enabled support for GameCube controllers connected via USB with the GameCube adapter that was available for the Wii U as well as a new adapter produced for the Switch; GameCube controllers can be used with most games compatible with the Switch's Pro Controller, such as Super Smash Bros. Ultimate. USB computer keyboards are supported for certain tasks, such as text entry.

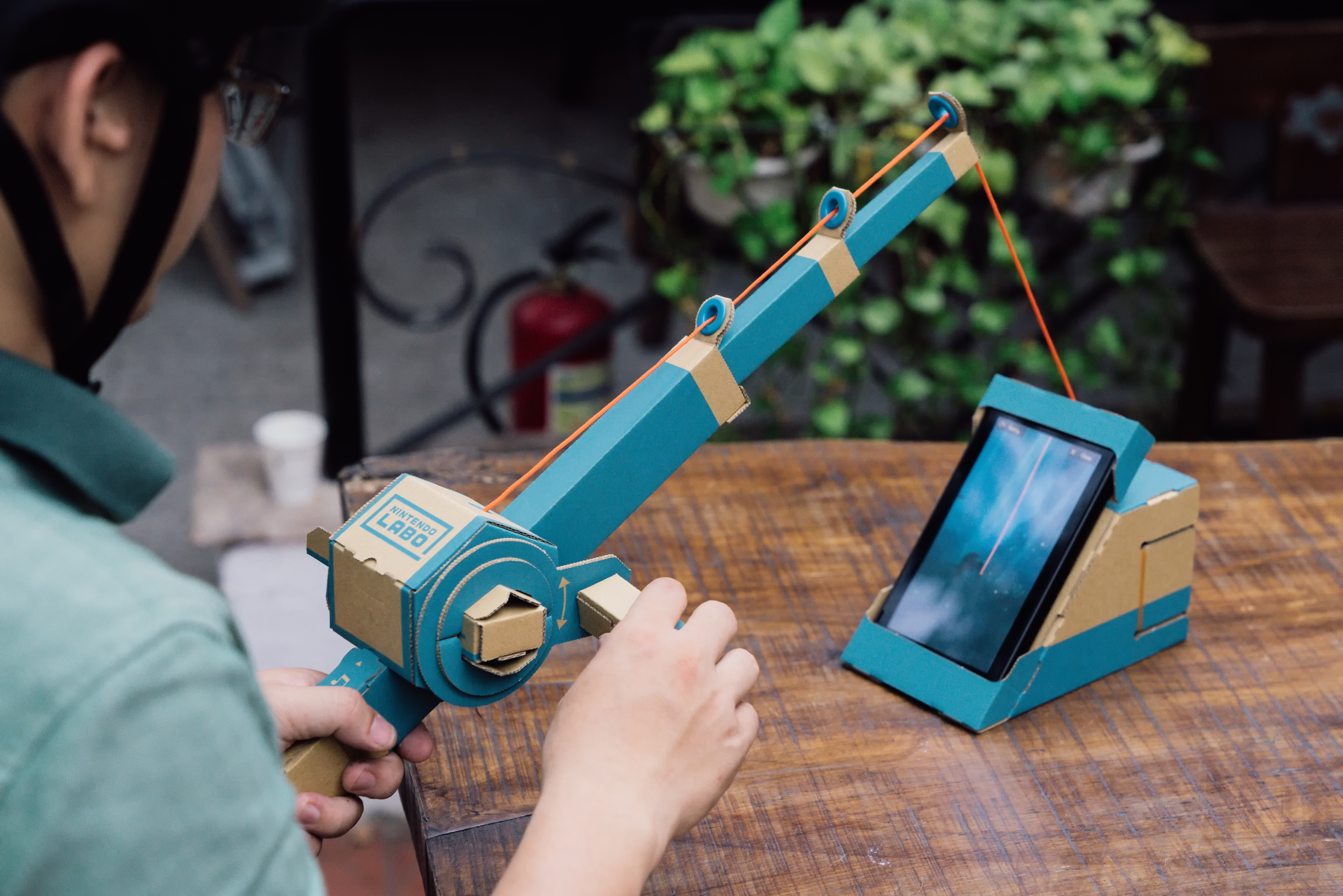
A Nintendo Labo kit simulating a fishing rod and reel

In January 2018, Nintendo announced Nintendo Labo, a child-oriented platform that combines games coupled with do-it-yourself cardboard projects that attach or wrap around the Switch Console and Joy-Con, effectively creating toys around the Switch hardware to interact with games. These cardboard units, which may also include string, rubber bands, and other pieces, are referred to as Toy-Con. The game software provides instructions for the Toy-Con construction and provides the interface to control the Toy-Con. Such examples given include a remote-controlled "car", where the two Joy-Con attach to the car and their vibration feedback provide the motion for the car, controlled from the Switch, a fishing rod where the Joy-Con are part of the reel and handle of the rod and their motion controls used to simulate the act of fishing in the mini-game, and a small toy piano.

In September 2018, with the release of Nintendo Switch Online, Nintendo introduced NES Controller style Joy-Con controllers alongside its classic games service. In September 2019, when SNES games were added to the service, wireless SNES Controllers were released. In September 2021, when Nintendo 64 games and Sega Genesis games were added to the service as part of the Expansion Pack subscription tier, wireless Nintendo 64 Controllers and Sega Genesis Control Pads were released for use with their respective services.

Nintendo released Ring Fit Adventure in October 2019, which includes a Leg Strap to mount a Joy-Con to a leg, and the Ring-Con, a flexible hard plastic ring with Joy-Con mounting. The player interacts with the game, fashioned after a console role-playing game, by doing various exercises, such as running in place, squatting, and squeezing the ring, to perform in-game actions of running, jumping, and attacking and defending, respectively. Such features are part of Nintendo's "quality of life" goals to incorporate physical activity alongside the Switch, similar to past games like Wii Fit.

In February 2017, Nintendo president Tatsumi Kimishima stated that it had been "studying" virtual reality solutions, but felt that comfort was a main concern. Nintendo of America president and COO Reggie Fils-Aimé also cited that existing VR solutions were not "fun" or "social". Nintendo ultimately unveiled a new Labo VR kit in March 2019, using a cardboard headset and viewer placed in front of the console's screen, in combination with attached accessories.

Stands and alternate docks have also been created for the Switch to overcome the limitations of the device's own kickstand for tabletop play, including an official "Adjustable Charging Stand" that can be connected to the device's AC adapter.

=== Technical specifications ===
Technical specifications of Nintendo Switch
| System-on-chip | Name | | Nvidia Tegra X1 (Note: Consoles made after August 2019 use the Nvidia Tegra X1+ chip, built on a 16 nm process, and use LPDDR4X RAM, improving battery life and offering slightly better performance. These units shipped in different packaging, but Nintendo did not otherwise distinguish them from earlier models.) |
| System-on-chip | Process | | 20 nm |
| CPU | Type | | Quad-core ARM Cortex-A57 (Note: The four ARM Cortex-A53 cores on the chip are disabled.) |
| CPU | ISA | | ARMv8-A |
| CPU | Clock rate | | 1.02–1.785 GHz |
| CPU | Cache | L1 | 48 kB + 32 kB per core |
| CPU | Cache | L2 | 2 MB |
| GPU | Type | | Nvidia GM20B Maxwell-based |
| GPU | Clock rate | | 307.2–768 MHz |
| GPU | Stream processors | | 256 (157–393 GFLOPS) |
| GPU | TMUs | | 16 (4.9–12.3 GTexel/s) |
| GPU | ROPs | | 16 (4.9–12.3 GPixel/s) |
| GPU | Compute units | | 2 |
| Memory | Total | | 4 GB LPDDR4 SDRAM |
| Memory | Clock rate | | 1331.2–1600 MHz |
| Memory | Bandwidth | | 21.3–25.6 GB/s |
| Storage | Main | Type | eMMC NAND flash memory |
| Storage | Main | Capacity | Base: 32 GB; OLED: 64 GB |
| Storage | Removable | Type | microSD |
| Storage | Removable | Capacity | Up to 2 TB |
| Media | Type | | Nintendo Switch game card |
| Media | Capacity | | 1–32 GB |
| Display | Main | Type | Base: LCD screen; OLED: OLED screen |
| Display | Main | Size (diagonal) | Base: 6.2-inch; Lite: 5.5-inch; OLED: 7-inch |
| Display | Main | Resolution | Base: 720p (237 ppi); Lite: 720p (267 ppi); OLED: 720p (210 ppi) |
| Display | External | Interface | Base: HDMI 1.4b; OLED: HDMI 2.0 |
| Display | External | Resolution | 1080p, 720p or 480p |

==== SoC, CPU, GPU and RAM ====
The Switch uses a system-on-chip from the Tegra family of products, developed in partnership with Nvidia. No specific details were revealed beyond that it is a "custom" Tegra chip "based on the same architecture as the world's top-performing GeForce gaming graphics cards" that are common in personal computers, and has a custom API known as "NVN", which is designed to "bring lightweight, fast gaming to the masses". Takeda described the Nvidia chipset as being critical for delivering gamers a level of performance similar to that which they experience on personal computers, helping to achieve "high performance but low power consumption" for the Switch. Pre-release reports, unconfirmed by either Nintendo or Nvidia, stated that the SoC would be a standard Nvidia Tegra X1 instead, composed of four ARM Cortex-A57 and four ARM Cortex-A53 CPU cores along with 256 Maxwell-based CUDA GPU cores. This was later corroborated by an analysis on the console done by Tech Insights in March 2017. The CPU cores are normally clocked at 1.02 GHz, but a firmware update released in April 2019 allows the CPU to clock up to 1.785 GHz in certain games during loading to improve load times. While the SoC features eight CPU cores, the Switch only uses the four 64-bit Cortex-A57 cores, of which one is reserved to the operating system. The GPU cores are clocked at 768 MHz when the device is docked and fluctuate between 307.2, 384, and 460 MHz when undocked. This gives the Switch's GPU a theoretical peak performance of 393 GFLOPS docked and 236 GFLOPS when undocked. A later iFixit teardown of the final product confirmed 4 GB of LPDDR4 RAM. It is clocked at 1600 MHz while docked and a reduced 1331.2 MHz undocked.

==== Wireless compatibility ====
The Switch offers Wi-Fi 5 (dual-band 802.11ac wireless connectivity compliant with 802.11 a/b/g/n/ac modes). Up to eight Switch consoles can be connected in a wireless ad hoc network for local multiplayer games, and multiple players can play on each of the connected Switch consoles. The Switch uses Bluetooth 4.1 for wireless communication between the console and its controllers. Users can purchase a third-party USB LAN adapter for wired connectivity when the console is docked for TV mode. Nintendo's Wii LAN adapter accessory is also compatible with the Switch via USB ports on the Switch dock. In the case of at least one game, Splatoon 2, ten Switch consoles can use the Ethernet network to connect locally, though only eight can play directly while the other two can watch as spectators.

==== Power/battery ====
The Switch is primarily powered in Handheld mode by a non-removable 4,310 mAh, 3.7 V Lithium-ion rechargeable battery. The battery life is estimated to be between 2.5 and 6.5 hours, depending on the software being used. Nintendo gives the example of The Legend of Zelda: Breath of the Wild supporting approximately three hours of battery life. The battery can be charged either while in the dock, or through a standard USB-C connector on the console. The estimated recharge time while the unit is in sleep mode is about 3 hours. Nintendo offers the means for replacing batteries through its customer support. Each Joy-Con has its own non-removable 525 mAh, 3.7 V Lithium-ion battery separate from the console, with an estimated twenty-hour lifespan. These batteries are automatically charged if they are attached to the console while it is charging itself. Additional accessories have other means to charge the Joy-Con. While the basic Joy-Con grip that ships with the Switch does not offer charging capabilities, a separate premium Joy-Con grip includes a USB-C connector port that can be used to charge the Joy-Con batteries while they are connected to this grip.

==== Storage ====
The Switch includes 32 GB of internal storage, 25.9 GB of which is user-accessible. This can be expanded up to 2 TB using a microSD, a microSDHC or a microSDXC card. A microSD card slot is located under the Switch's kickstand, where a microSD card can be inserted. If the microSD card is used, the Switch will only store game save data on the internal memory, leaving data that can be re-acquired on the microSD card. Save data will always be stored on the console, regardless if the source is a physical game card or a digital download copy. At launch, there was no way to transfer save files to another Switch console. Save game and profile transfers between Switch consoles were added in the 4.0.0 system update in October 2017, while the 10.0.0 system update in April 2020 allowed most update data, digital games (i.e., downloaded from eShop), and other downloaded content to be swapped between the internal memory and a microSD card. MicroSD and microSDHC were supported initially, and microSDXC card support was later added to the Switch's software via a system update. SD cards and miniSD cards do not fit the Switch. The Switch did not support external storage units at launch, but Nintendo stated that they were looking into adding this feature in the future.

==== Connectivity ====
The Switch console has a 3.5 mm headphone jack. At launch, the Switch did not support Bluetooth wireless headphones, though they can also be connected if a Bluetooth adapter is connected to the headphone jack. A system update in October 2017 partially resolved this issue by enabling support for wireless USB headphones when the receiver is connected to the USB port on the console when docked. This was later resolved in a system update in September 2021 when it enabled support for Bluetooth Wireless headphone devices without the need for a USB adapter.

==== Later revisions ====
Around July 2018, Nintendo quietly released Switch units with minor hardware changes and updated firmware to block exploits in the original Switch models that led to the ability to extract ROM images from game cards and software. Nintendo claimed in its case against Team Xecuter and Gary Bowser in February that this hardware change was specifically the result of Team Xecuter's sales of modified Switch chips that used the exploit.

An updated version of the Nintendo Switch under model number "HAC-001(-01)" was announced on July 17, 2019, and was released in Japan and North America in mid-August 2019, and in the United Kingdom in September 2019. This revision uses the Tegra X1+ SoC, a more efficient chipset compared to the Tegra X1 used in the original model. Thus, the time-on-battery was effectively extended to 4.5–9 hours, depending on the game being played. No other system component was updated in this revision.

=== Production ===
The Nintendo Switch is produced between Taiwan-based Foxconn and Japan-based Hosiden, with Foxconn accounting for the largest volume. Nintendo did not plan to sell the Switch below manufacturing cost at launch, as they had done for both the 3DS and Wii U at their respective launches; Nintendo affirmed that the Switch would be profitable from launch during its 2016 fiscal year earnings report, as the company saw the console as a key earnings driver for 2017 and beyond. Fomalhaut Techno Solutions, a Japanese product teardown firm, estimated that the Switch cost $257 to make compared to its $299 MSRP, with the console and dock at $167 while each Joy-Con costs $45. Kimishima said that they may be able to see further profitability on the Switch when they can achieve volume discounts on components once they reach a level of about 10 million Switch units.

Prior to launch, Nintendo anticipated shipping two million Nintendo Switch units by the end of the console's first month, and assured that its supply chain would be able to meet demand following the launch period to avoid the shortage situation with the NES Classic Edition in late 2016. Kimishima anticipated that the Switch will have lifetime sales numbers similar to the Wii, which sold 101 million units by 2016.

Following the initial sales report numbers in April 2017, the Financial Times reported that the company was seeking to produce 18 million Switch units in its 2017 financial year as to avoid "customer tantrums" with poor supply levels, particularly near the 2017 holiday season and the release of Super Mario Odyssey on October 27, 2017. Fils-Aimé said in September 2017 that their 2017 production target for the Switch could be hampered by bottlenecks in individual components. DigiTimes reported in October 2017 that Nintendo had further shifted the production rate for the Switch up to 2 million per month, with plans to ship 20 million units by the end of the year; the newspaper also stated that the production rate was limited by component availability, and not by other factors of Nintendo's production process.

On the presentation of the 2017 fiscal year results to investors, Nintendo's newly named president Shuntaro Furukawa stated that they anticipate producing 20 million Switch consoles over the 2018 fiscal year keeping the momentum of its sales in that year.

In June 2019, The Wall Street Journal reported that Nintendo was starting to move some of its production of the Switch and two hardware revisions of the Switch outside of China and into Southeast Asia to limit the impact of new United States tariffs on electronics made in China.

In November 2020, Bloomberg reported that Nintendo asked its assembly partners to boost production of the Switch by 20% and raised its target goal of Switch sales for the 2020 fiscal year from 25 million units sold to 30 million units, having previously reportedly raised their target for the fiscal year from 22 million units sold to 25 million units in August 2020. These boosts in production have been attributed to more demand mainly due to the success of Animal Crossing: New Horizons during the COVID-19 pandemic.

=== Other models ===
==== Nintendo Switch Lite ====
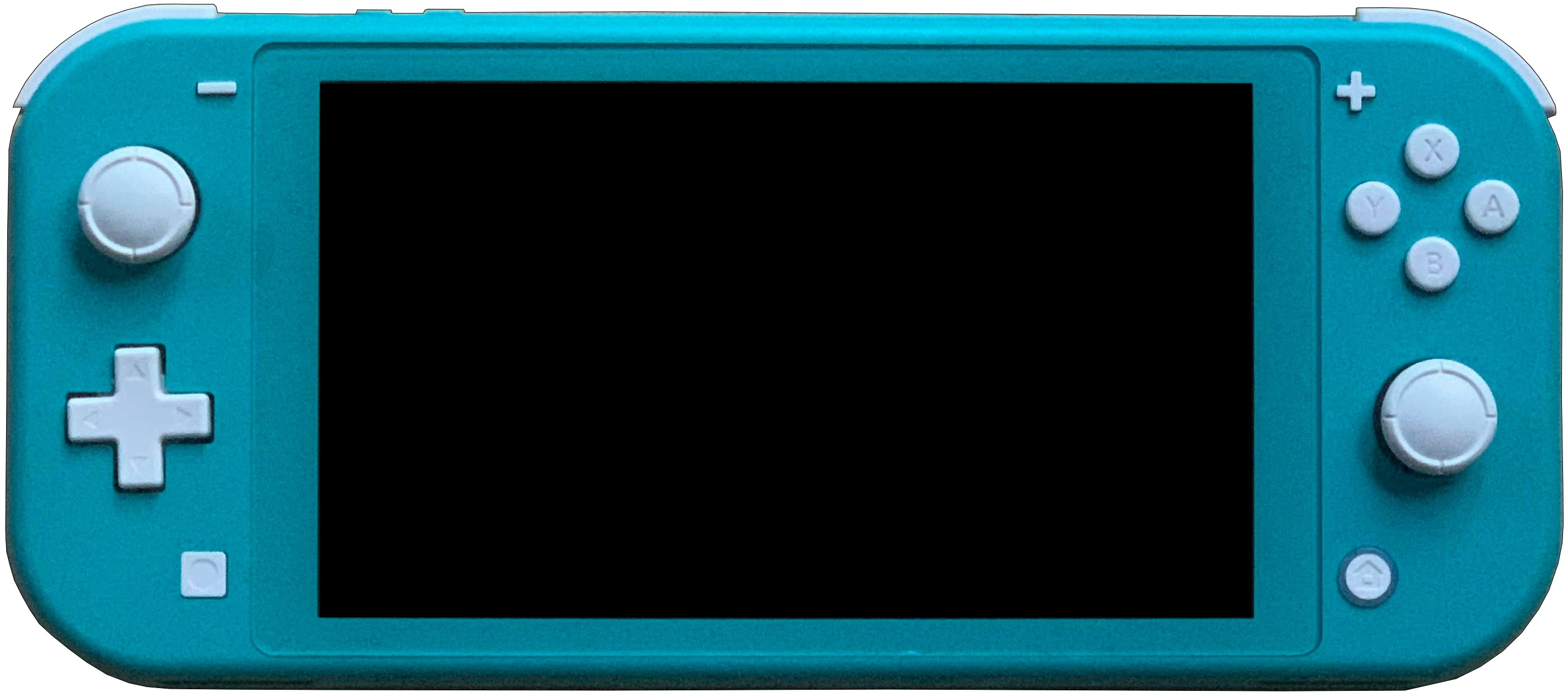
The Nintendo Switch Lite does not separate from the Joy-Cons.

The Nintendo Switch Lite is a revision of the Switch designed for handheld play released worldwide on September 20, 2019, with an MSRP of US$199.99. First announced in July 2019, the Switch Lite integrates the controller hardware into the main unit, and uses a smaller screen measuring 5.5 inches (14 cm) diagonally. Additionally, a regular directional pad replaces the four directional buttons on the integrated left Joy-Con. (Note: Nintendo always refers to a directional pad (D-pad) as a "+Control Pad", including in the Nintendo Switch Lite context.) While using a smaller battery than the original Switch, the Switch Lite uses a more power-efficient chipset, the 16-nanometer Tegra X1+, to extend the estimated use time from 2.5 to 6.5 hours to 3–7 hours on a single battery charge.

According to The Wall Street Journal, Nintendo's goal with the Switch Lite was to produce a sub US$200 unit, aimed at casual gamers, to compete with gaming services that do not require a dedicated device. To achieve this, Nintendo negotiated on reduced prices from its component suppliers. Further, the Journal stated that Nintendo had gained Murata Manufacturing as a battery supplier in addition to TDK, to lower costs by causing competition between the two companies. The Switch Lite is physically larger than previous Nintendo handhelds: its display is 0.62 inches (1.6 cm) larger and the unit measures 1.9 inches (4.8 cm) longer when compared to a New Nintendo 3DS XL, which itself was the large-sized model in the Nintendo 3DS line.

The Switch Lite normally only supports games that can be played in handheld mode, retaining features like the Switch's gyroscopic sensors, Bluetooth, Wi-Fi, and NFC compatibility. Some tabletop games that require the HD Rumble or IR camera features, such as 1-2-Switch, require players to use separate Joy-Con controllers with the Switch Lite. The system does not support any docking or connectivity to a television and is thus incompatible with games that require television mode. Players who attempt to purchase games that require television or tabletop mode via the eShop on the Switch Lite will be notified of the incompatibility. Though not included with the system, the Switch Lite does support external controllers otherwise compatible with standard Switch models, such as standalone Joy-Con controllers, though they cannot be docked to the system. Some controllers, such as GameCube controllers, work with the system, but require extra adapters, as the normal GameCube to Switch adapter uses the USB ports on the full-size Switch's dock.

==== OLED model ====
The Nintendo Switch – OLED Model features a larger OLED display, a metal body and a redesigned kickstand.

On July 6, 2021, Nintendo officially announced a new model called the Nintendo Switch – OLED Model. The OLED model features a 7-inch (180 mm) 720p OLED display, and when docked, outputs to 1080p resolution similar to the original model. Additionally, it features 64 GB of internal storage, enhanced audio functions, a magnesium alloy body and a wider adjustable stand for use in tabletop mode. The unit ships with a new dock that includes a wired LAN port. It features similar technical specifications as the base Switch model, and is compatible with all Switch games and existing accessories. The unit ships in two bundles: one that includes a black dock and a red and blue Joy-Con (similar to the base model's default color scheme), and one that includes a white dock and a white Joy-Con. It was released on October 8, 2021, alongside the release of Metroid Dread, with a retail price of $349.99. Ahead of the release of the OLED version on September 13, 2021, Nintendo reduced the base price of the original Switch model in Europe from €329.99 to €299.99, and in the UK from £279.99 to £259.99, which Nintendo said also reflected changes in currency exchange rates. All other regions – including North America and Australia – did not receive a price cut. Four special-edition models were released: those for Splatoon 3, Pokémon Scarlet and Violet, The Legend of Zelda: Tears of the Kingdom, and a "Mario Red Edition" to tie into Super Mario Bros. Wonder.

==== Rumored high-end model ====
In early 2019, reports from The Wall Street Journal and The Nikkei claimed that Nintendo had plans for two new models of the Nintendo Switch. One new model was a lightweight revision, later revealed as the Nintendo Switch Lite; the other was to be a more powerful console to be released in 2020. A notification from Nintendo alerting the Federal Communications Commission of changes to the Switch's hardware in July 2019 were used as further evidence for a new model. DigiTimes later corroborated previous reports, claiming Nintendo planned to release a model with an improved CPU and magnesium alloy body in the second half of 2020—in December 2019, Nintendo denied any intent to release a new model in 2020, and the global chip shortage beginning in 2020 impacted console production regardless. Bloomberg continued to state Nintendo was preparing to release a higher-end Nintendo Switch model with an OLED screen and the ability to output a 4K resolution, and the model would release in late 2021. However, Nintendo announced the Nintendo Switch OLED model in July 2021. Nintendo of America president Doug Bowser said that Nintendo aims to use technology to enhance gameplay, and does not create "technology for technology's sake". Bloomberg again stated that a higher-end Switch was in development, and other upgrades were scrapped in favor of only the OLED screen in light of the chip shortage. In response, Nintendo said that the report was "not true" and made false claims about the company. Zynga—one company named by Bloomberg as having received a development kit of an upgraded Nintendo Switch model—also denied the factuality of the report. Continued rumors of a high-end model were fueled by a leak of Nvidia's source code showing a custom chip with DLSS support made for Nintendo. In December 2022, Digital Foundry claimed that any upgraded Nintendo Switch model was no longer in development, and that Nintendo instead was focusing on the system's successor, which was later revealed to be the Nintendo Switch 2.

== Software ==
The main menu screen of the Switch system software

The Nintendo Switch runs a proprietary operating system named Horizon, built on a microkernel architecture. The Switch's user interface features tile-based access to games that are either present in the game card slot or stored within the unit's storage devices. It includes quick access buttons for a News feed from Nintendo, eShop access, and a photo album for screenshots captured during gameplay; the 4.0 update to the software in October 2017 also enabled capturing and sharing video from select games. A single Switch console supports up to eight user profiles, which each can be tied to a Nintendo Account user ID. At launch, profiles could be represented by either a pre-made avatar from an internal gallery, or by using a Mii. Compared to previous Nintendo consoles, the Nintendo Switch's Mii editor allowed for a wider variety of color options for aspects such as hairstyles, and was implemented into the system settings instead of being an independent application. On February 28, 2022, Nintendo launched a "Missions and Rewards" system for Nintendo Switch Online subscribers, allowing them to complete missions set by the application (like backing up save data or playing Game Trials software) to earn Platinum Points which can be spent on various icon parts from different Nintendo games and franchises. Icon parts of a specific game (like backgrounds, borders and characters) can then be combined to create an icon.

Prior to the 4.0 update, players discovered that the Switch's firmware included an Easter egg allowing players to play the NES Golf game via a built-in emulator. While Nintendo has not confirmed its presence, journalists and players believed this to be a tribute to Nintendo's former president Satoru Iwata; Golf was programmed by Iwata, and the game could only be accessed if the system clock was set to July 11 – the day Iwata died in 2015 – and the Joy-Con are moved similarly to how Iwata would move his hands in his Nintendo Direct presentations. Some Japanese users referred to this as an omamori (charm) left by Iwata himself. With the 4.0 update, the executable code for this Easter egg appears to have been wiped by Nintendo.

In August 2018, a Twitter user found files on the Switch's firmware while reverse-engineering the console, which suggested that Nintendo was possibly testing VR functionality for the Switch. The Twitter user was able to activate the hidden "VR Mode", which split the screen into two displays. Hackers found that the code related to possible VR functionality had been hidden in the Switch firmware for over a year.

=== Security ===
Nintendo continued its white hat security program that it had with the Nintendo 3DS. With the help of third-party website HackerOne, Nintendo will award up to $20,000 to the first user to identify any vulnerability that impacts piracy, cheating, or the potential sending of inappropriate content to younger users, the amount based on the severity of the security flaw.

In April 2018, two separate groups discovered a method to use an exploit chain in the Tegra chip system that can be used to boot other software on the Switch. The exploit could not be patched through a software update, as the BootROM of the Tegra X1 cannot be modified after the chip leaves the factory. Both groups had notified Nvidia and Nintendo of the exploit before publicly announcing their findings. Users studying the hardware determined that Nintendo has the capacity to permanently ban specific Switch consoles used to obtain software via this exploit from the Nintendo Network, as the Switch console includes a unique device identification code used as part of the validation to the Network. As games downloaded from the Nintendo Network include encrypted information that ties the Nintendo ID to the console, which is transmitted to Nintendo when users start playing games, Nintendo can track unapproved software downloads and take action. Nintendo has reportedly fixed the vulnerability in newer Switch units as of July 2018.

In June 2018, two hackers found a way to run the Switch system's developer software menu on non-developer Switch units, allowing users to directly load games onto SD cards or create custom avatars for their user profile, including pornographic and NSFW pictures, which violate Nintendo's terms of service. A Nintendo spokesperson responded to Kotaku's article on the topic, saying that "Modified Nintendo Switch systems have been banned".

Shortly after the release of Nintendo Switch Online in September 2018, hackers and modders were able to figure out how to run unauthorized ROMs on the Nintendo Switch NES emulator. A Switch hacker who goes by the name DevRin, was the first to discover the hack and posted his findings on YouTube, which prompted a modder who goes by the name KapuccinoHeck to investigate the matter with two others and their findings were later posted on KapuccinoHeck's Twitter account.

=== Online services ===
Nintendo Switch Online logo

Nintendo Switch user profiles can be linked to a Nintendo Account, which enables access to online features and the ability to download and purchase software from Nintendo eShop. A Nintendo Account can be created with an account from a third-party social networking service or an existing Nintendo Network ID from a 3DS or Wii U. Nintendo does not plan to offer first-party social networking services on Switch, such as Miiverse or StreetPass, the latter owing to Nintendo's promotion of Switch as primarily being a home console. Instead, profiles could be linked to existing social networks such as Facebook and X (then Twitter) for social and sharing features, though integration with X has since been removed.

Players can register friends through Friend Codes as with previous Nintendo systems, searching for friends in the local network, through past multiplayer interactions, or through Nintendo Account profiles registered as friends on Nintendo mobile apps such as Mario Kart Tour and Super Mario Run. In March 2017, Nintendo said that they had plans to provide other methods for registering friends, including through third-party social media and via Nintendo Network IDs. Support for registering friends on the Switch via Facebook and X (formerly Twitter) was added on March 13, 2018, as part of the 5.0.0 system update. The Switch has no native support for Nintendo Network IDs, but users can link their Nintendo Network ID credentials to a Nintendo Account profile, which enables the ability to add friends that they had already registered on their 3DS or Wii U, and share an eShop balance between all three platforms.

In line with Microsoft and Sony consoles, a subscription is required to access online multiplayer in most games. The Nintendo Switch Online subscription includes access to online play, voice chat, access to an ongoing Nintendo Classics library of Nintendo Entertainment System (NES), Super Nintendo Entertainment System (SNES), and Game Boy games, cloud storage for save data on supported games, as well as other special offers and promotions. A premium expansion pack subscription tier was launched in October 2021, which added support for Nintendo 64 and Sega Genesis games to Nintendo Classics, followed by Game Boy Advance (GBA) games in February 2023. The expansion pack also includes access to some paid downloadable content, including the Mario Kart 8 Booster Course Pack, Splatoon 2: Octo Expansion, and Animal Crossing: New Horizons Happy Home Paradise. Free-to-play games such as Fortnite Battle Royale and Warframe are exempt from the subscription requirement for online play.

The Nintendo Switch Online mobile app allows access to voice chat for Switch Online subscribers, as well as access to game-specific microsites. Unlike its competitors, voice chat is not supported via the console itself, requiring use of the app on a smartphone instead. A separate app provides access to parental controls for the console.

=== Media support ===
The Switch did not launch with any multimedia-oriented features, such as a web browser, (Note: The Switch does include a fully functioning web browser, however it is only used for network login pages, the eShop, displaying built in user manuals, and for sharing video and screenshots from the album. It is not accessible otherwise and lacks many features such as browser history and favorites.) messaging system or support for video streaming services. Fils-Aimé said that because the Switch is geared as a gaming console that is far different from what their competitors offer, they had focused on achieving that goal first and foremost, and did not see media support as a differentiator from their competitors.

Niconico, a popular Japanese video service, launched for the Switch in Japan on July 13, 2017, and was the Switch's first third-party media app in any market. Hulu was the first video streaming application released for the Switch in the United States on November 9, 2017. A YouTube application was released on November 8, 2018. The app was discontinued on February 5, 2026. Fils-Aimé said in June 2018 that conversations to bring Netflix to the Switch were "on-going", though Netflix was never released on the Switch. On November 4, 2020, a trial version app of the Tencent Video streaming service was launched exclusively for Nintendo Switch consoles officially distributed by Tencent in mainland China. An official version app was never released as the Chinese Switch eShop was shut down on March 31, 2026. Funimation launched their own streaming app for the Nintendo Switch, featuring a reworked layout and new functions. The app became available via eShop in the United States and Canada on December 15, 2020, and launched in various other countries at later dates, such as the United Kingdom and Ireland on March 22, 2021. A version of the Twitch app launched for the Nintendo Switch on November 11, 2021, in most regions worldwide. The eShop version of the app allowed users to watch or follow any live or recorded content on Twitch, but did not support any native ability for Switch players to contribute content. The app was discontinued in January 2024.

Korg Gadget, a music production app, was released for the Nintendo Switch on April 26, 2018. InkyPen, a comics and manga subscription app, launched exclusively on the Switch worldwide on December 17, 2018. Izneo, another comics and manga subscription service, was released for the Switch on February 28, 2019. FUZE4, a text-based programming language app, was released in August 2019.

== Games ==
=== Distribution ===
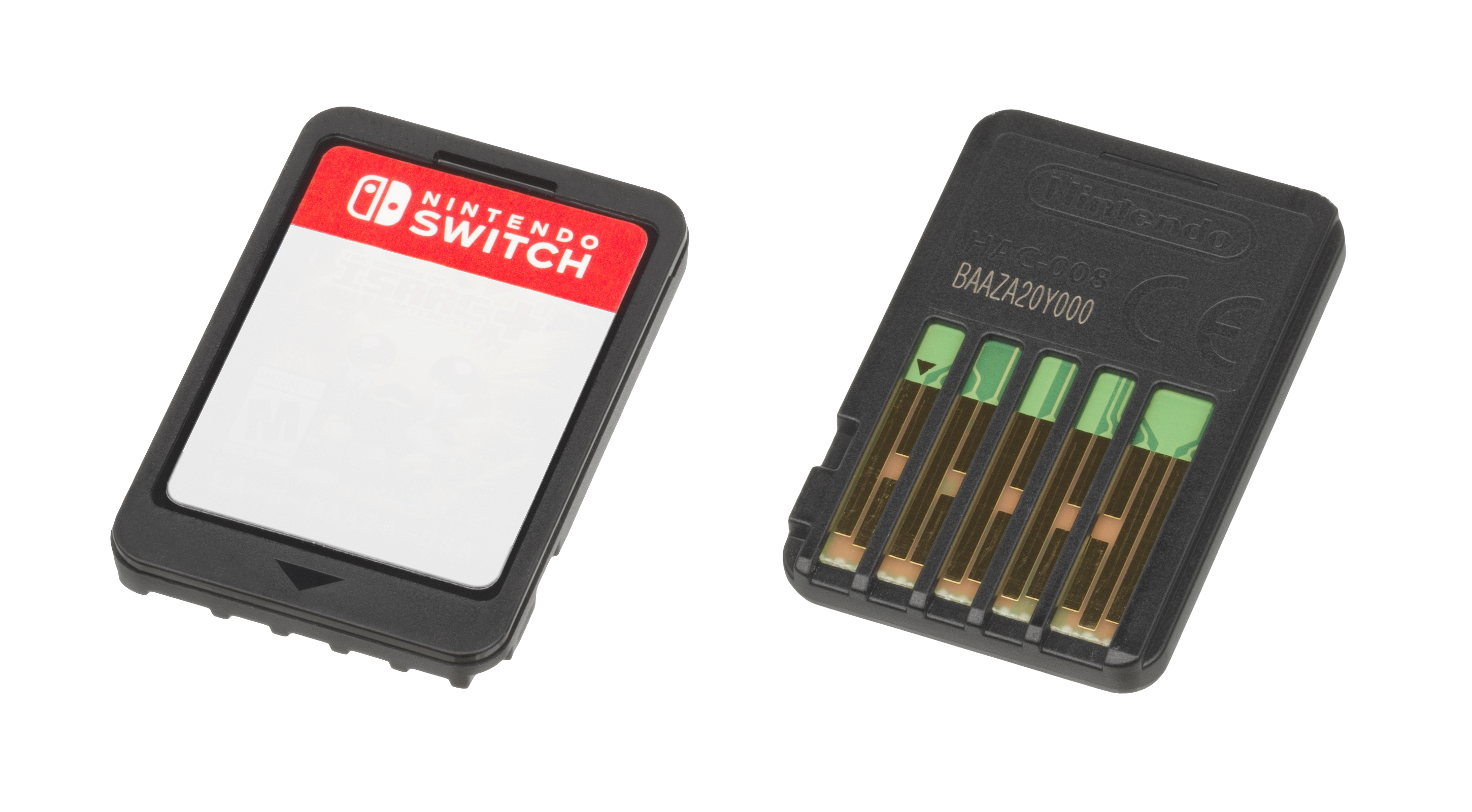
The Nintendo Switch's game cartridge

Games for the Nintendo Switch can be obtained through either retail channels or digitally through the Nintendo eShop. Games distributed at retail are stored on proprietary cartridges, similar in design to the game cards used for Nintendo 3DS games, albeit smaller and thinner. As the world's first major hybrid console, the console is the first major home-playable video game system to make use of cartridges since the Nintendo 64. Due to their small size at 31 by 21 by 3 millimetres (1.22 in × 0.83 in × 0.12 in), Nintendo coats each cartridge with denatonium benzoate, a non-toxic bitterant used to discourage children from ingesting them. Nintendo offered a suggested retail price for Switch games at the console's launch of US$60, equivalent to the price for new games on either the Xbox One and PlayStation 4. Nintendo otherwise allows publishers to set the price for a game, only requiring the list price be the same for physical and digital releases, if a physical release is made. This has caused some games also available on other consoles to be priced higher on the Switch due to the costs of manufacturing the game card for the Switch version. Online media outlets have colloquially referred to this price hike as the "Switch tax". The "Switch tax" also applies to many games that had been previously released on other platforms ported later to the Switch, where the Switch game price reflects the original price of the game when it was first released rather than its current price. As of August 2018, it is estimated that the cost of Switch games is an average of 10% over other formats.

Game cards at the time of the Switch's release had a 32 GB capacity; Nintendo had planned to introduce 64 GB game cards by the second half of 2018, but had to push this back. Some physical games may still require content to be installed to internal storage, with some games using a significant portion of the internal memory if a microSD card is not available. Other physical games which have a large amount of content may require a microSD card to be present in the Switch, such as NBA 2K18; such games are clearly marked on the cover to show these requirements.

The Switch supports the ability for cloud gaming to run games that require more hardware capabilities than the Switch allows, running these games over a network with the game computations performed on server hardware. These games may be tied to specific regions due to purchasing options. Early examples, such as Resident Evil 7: Biohazard, Phantasy Star Online 2 and Assassin's Creed: Odyssey were primarily limited to Japanese releases, while later releases, such as Control, Hitman 3, and Kingdom Hearts Integrum Masterpiece were offered worldwide.

Unlike previous Nintendo home consoles, the Switch is region-free. This allows players to use cartridges or downloaded content from any part of the world, with the exception of Chinese game content which can only be played on Switch units manufactured for that country. Nintendo recommends using the appropriate regional eShop for digital purposes for obtaining the best post-purchase support if needed. Nintendo opted to go region-free to reduce the amount of workload and cost to both themselves and developers in having to manage two or more regional certification processes and different ROM cartridge production pathways for those regions. Further, eShop purchases, while still tied to the Nintendo Account, are not tied to the specific Switch console, as was the case for previous Nintendo hardware. Once the user re-registers their account to a Switch, they have access to download all previous purchases; however, a user can only have their account registered on one console at a time, and downloaded software tied to an account cannot be used if that account is not registered to the device. With the console's 6.0.0 system update, alongside the launch of the Online service in September 2018, a user can play games that they have purchased from the eShop on a second Switch console, though requiring continuous online connection and other restrictions.

The Switch does not use optical discs, and as such does not have native backward compatibility with software from any previous Nintendo console. The Switch is also not backward compatible with other digital games from previous consoles.

Emulated versions of games from previous Nintendo systems are offered through eShop and the Nintendo Switch Online service, although the blanket Virtual Console brand used for these releases on Wii, Wii U, and 3DS has been dropped in favor of Nintendo Classics. In February 2017, Kimishima said that the Switch is powerful enough to emulate games from previous Nintendo consoles.

=== Third-party support ===
One of the generally perceived failures of the Wii U was a lack of support from third-party developers, leading to a weak library of games. Nintendo was more aggressive in trying to bring on third-party developers, early in the Switch's development, to ensure a stronger lineup of games. Takahashi and Koizumi reached out to many of the third-parties directly to help gain their support early on. Electronic Arts' executive Patrick Söderlund said that Nintendo had taken a different track with attracting third-party developers to the Switch and have engaged Electronic Arts and other major developers throughout the development of the Switch, listening to their input, to help make the Switch more successful.

Nintendo also began gaining support of independent video game developers in the middle of 2016 to provide assistance to help them bring games to the Switch, led by Nintendo's head of partner management Damon Baker. They had tried to draw in indie developers near the end of the Wii U's lifetime, providing indie game demos that were highlighted during E3 2015, but by this point, the Wii U had already been considered a failure. Nintendo sees games such as Snipperclips as a model of their target for indie games, in which they worked to help provide Switch implementation support and software tools to these parties early in the console's lifecycle, according to Takahashi and Koizumi. Some, like Yacht Club Games, who have ported Shovel Knight to the Switch, noted that some of the major innovations in the Switch, such as the Joy-Con, were not revealed to them until just prior to the January 2017 announcement. Nintendo of America reached out to many independent developers and publishers, including Chucklefish, Team17, and Devolver Digital, to gain games for the platform and make the process of publishing easier. Nintendo still curates which games they allow on the system, using the company's past portfolio for evaluation, and still carefully time releases to keep a steady stream of new content. However, once a game is greenlit, pushing out patches and updates can be done rapidly and at no further cost to the developer. Nintendo also offers the Switch's dev kit at 50,000 yen, or about $450, far under the cost of a comparable dev kit for other consoles, making it more amenable for smaller developers to afford and build for the unit. Nintendo offers several of these indie games as "Nindies" through the eShop. Nintendo had anticipated that they would have at least sixty indie games released for the Switch through 2017, but ended up with over 320 games by the end of 2017 as a result of the console's popularity. Indie developers have found that Nintendo has also had a significant role in the promotion and marketing of their games, including using the games to help promote the Switch itself, in contrast to Microsoft or Sony. These developers also found Nintendo tries to keep a better rapport with fans of Nintendo's products, and help these fans identify Switch indie games they feel they will like the most, including those games that build on Nintendo's classic games from the NES, SNES, and Game Boy eras that can draw in a more global audience. Baker says that while they do try to encourage indie developers to release their games as a Switch console exclusive, they do not force developers towards this, knowing that the developers must have a good business case for doing so.

While many independent developers have praised Nintendo for better support for the Switch, others, speaking anonymously through Nintendo Life, noted that Nintendo seemed to have a "walled garden" approach with independent developers, a remnant from the WiiWare program that allowed a great deal of shovelware to be pushed onto it. These anonymous developers found that Nintendo was either eschewing some developers completely, or requiring them to have a well-known publishing partner or an inside person within Nintendo to be able to gain the rights to publish for the Switch. Baker said that they encourage self-publishing, but do also place value on trust of established partners for their recommendations of what games would be best for the Switch. Another factor limiting Nintendo is the availability of dev kits and other hardware at the start of the console's life. However, Baker does anticipate that Nintendo will be much more open in the future, once they have addressed the necessary issues for curation and discovery of games via the eShop.

During its official unveiling in October 2016, Nintendo deliberately opted not to provide a list of games for the system, as they "want people to touch the device in January [2017] and experience the software for themselves", according to Kimishima. Instead, Nintendo announced some of the partners that had committed to supporting the Switch; contrasting Nintendo's struggles to gain third-party support on-launch for previous platforms, the company initially listed 48 third-party publishers, studios, and middleware developers. Among these partners, Nintendo listed major publishers such as Activision, Bethesda, Electronic Arts, Sega, Square Enix, Take-Two Interactive, and Ubisoft.

Nintendo had previously relied more on providing its own internally developed tools and libraries that third-party developers would use to develop games for earlier systems. With the Switch, the company went a different route. According to Takahashi, "we have been aiming to realize an environment in which a variety of different third-party developers are able to easily develop compatible software", taking advantage of the Nvidia chipset's support for many standard libraries that allows for ease of transition from other platforms to the Switch. Unity Technologies, Epic Games, and the Khronos Group pledged support to help developers bring games to the Switch using their game engines and middleware, Unity, Unreal Engine 4, and the Vulkan and OpenGL graphical APIs, respectively; for instance, the Unreal Engine toolkit was updated in February 2017 to provide beta testing for native support for Switch games, with full support added by May 2017. In March 2018, Nintendo announced it had also gained support of YoYo Games' GameMaker Studio 2 engine for the Switch. Miyamoto said that Nintendo's own developers have "mastered" engines like Unreal, so that while it would be unlikely that Nintendo would release a first-party game using such software, they can help support developers using these tools on the Switch. Several indie developers who have previously worked on Nintendo's consoles said that the Switch was "the least demanding Nintendo console" they have developed.

In addition to these third-party middleware solutions, Nintendo developed its own NintendoWare Bezel Engine for first- and third-party developers, first announced in 2018, aimed "to provide an environment that can create interesting games in a short period of time while keeping development costs as low as possible". Games like Tetris 99 and Clubhouse Games: 51 Worldwide Classics were developed in this engine.

By 2022, the Switch was generally considered to have reversed the trend of flagging third party support for Nintendo consoles and game platforms, something that was attributed to Nintendo having made concerted outreach efforts towards third parties to bring them on board. Positive analyses of the Switch's impact on Nintendo's third party relations were, however, frequently laced with the caveat that Nintendo would have to work to transition their third party support from the Switch to the Switch's successor properly, something they had routinely failed at in the past.

=== Library ===
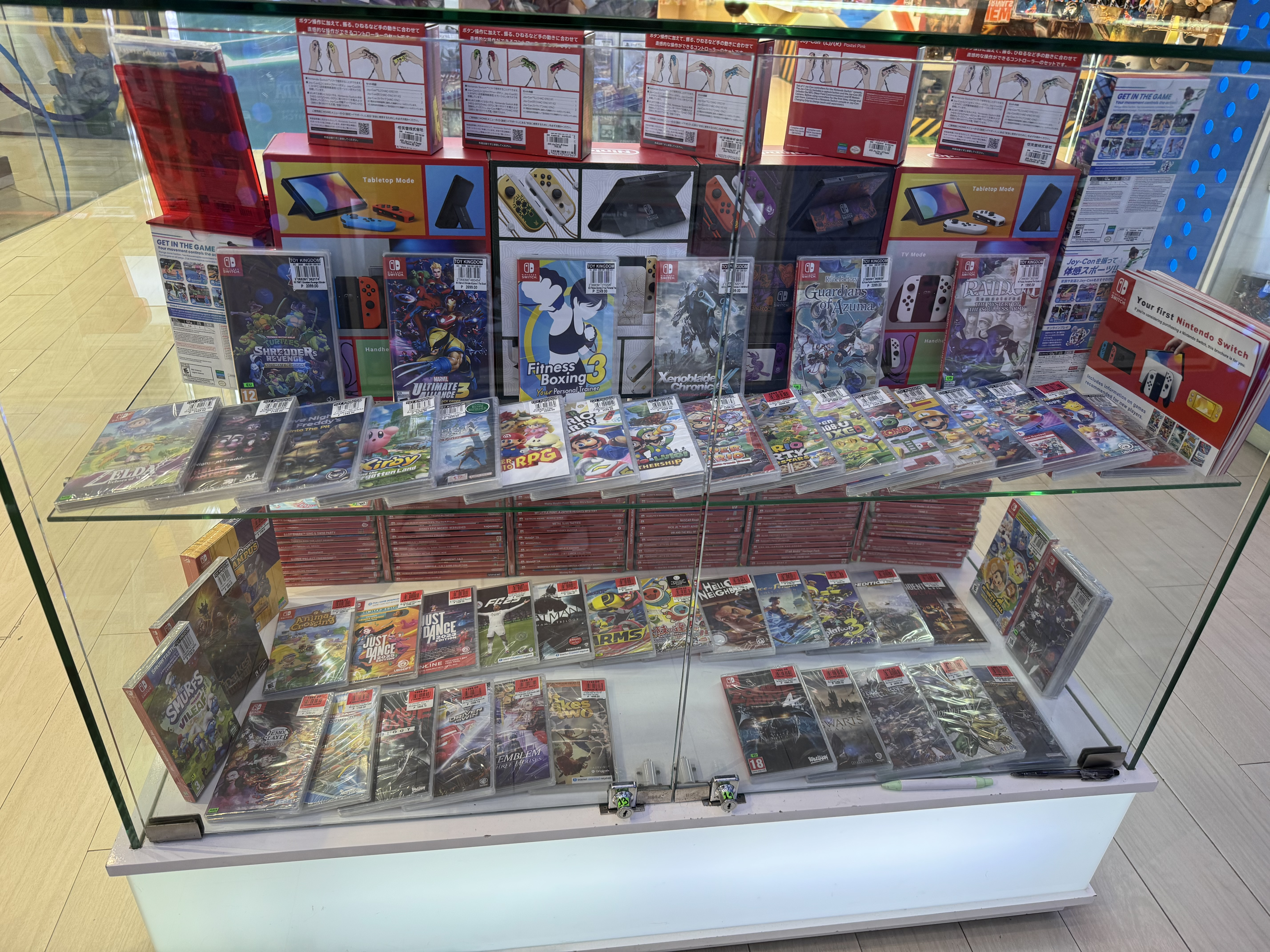
Display case at Toy Kingdom, showing off Nintendo Switch games and handhelds with accessories

The Legend of Zelda: Breath of the Wild, originally announced as a Wii U exclusive, was released for the Switch as a launch game. The console's reveal trailer showcased footage from new games in Nintendo franchises, including Super Mario Odyssey, Mario Kart 8 Deluxe, and Splatoon 2, as well as footage from NBA 2K18 and The Elder Scrolls V: Skyrim. Although Nintendo and third-parties stated at that time that these were not necessarily representative of Switch games, all five were confirmed as Switch releases during the January 2017 press events. Ultimately, the system launched with: (Note: Except Japan-only launch titles) 1-2-Switch, Arcade Archives, Fast RMX, I am Setsuna, Just Dance 2017, The Legend of Zelda: Breath of the Wild, New Frontier Days: Founding Pioneers, Othello, Skylanders: Imaginators, Snipperclips, Super Bomberman R, Voez, and Vroom in the Night Sky.

The Switch did not launch with any bundled games or have any pre-loaded games or game demos; Fils-Aimé stated that once they had decided on the price point and evaluated the forthcoming game lineup, they opted to allow consumers to choose which games to get rather than include one in the bundle and increase its price. At least ten games were shipped or digitally available alongside the Switch in time for its North American launch, including Nintendo's first-party games The Legend of Zelda: Breath of the Wild and 1-2-Switch.

Fils-Aimé said that Nintendo planned a "steady cadence of content" for the Switch after launch, avoiding the perceived situation with gaps between major releases for Wii U software. Kimishima said that Nintendo scheduled its first-party releases "to continue to provide new titles regularly without long gaps", as this "encourages consumers to continue actively playing the system, maintains buzz, and spurs continued sales momentum for Nintendo Switch." Journalists noted that Nintendo appeared to be pledged to this approach following their schedule of planned releases of first-party games for the Switch as announced during E3 2017, with a new game roughly every month into early 2018. 2023 was a record-breaking year for the Nintendo Switch, with 2,360 games released.

=== Virtual game cartridges ===
In a Nintendo Direct livestream at the end of March 2025, Nintendo announced that the Switch consoles — including the original Switch and its successor – will support Virtual Game Cards. With this feature, users own a physical key, thereby gaining the right to activate the digitally encrypted software and transfer games between consoles. Virtual Game Cards can also be loaned to other users within a Nintendo Switch Online Family account for two weeks, after which they automatically return to their original owner. The feature was activated via a system update on April 29, 2025.

== Marketing ==
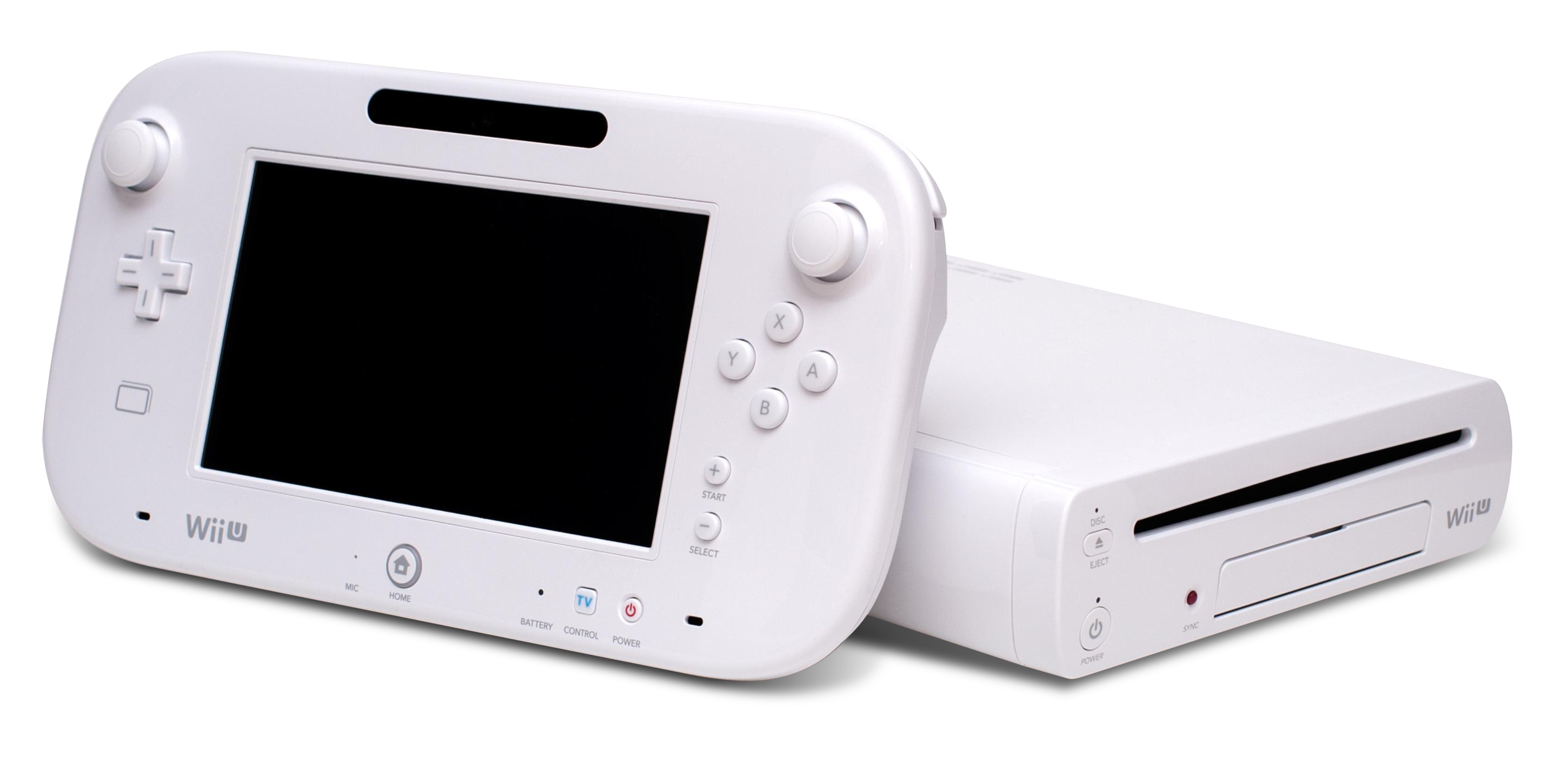
Nintendo sought to avoid the struggles it had with communicating the capabilities of the Switch's predecessor, the Wii U. Some have mistaken the Wii U GamePad (left) as an accessory for the original Wii console rather than a controller for the Wii U.

A key part of marketing the Switch was to be "crystal clear in our communication of what the product was and what the product could do", according to Fils-Aimé, so as to avoid similar issues with how they presented the Wii U. While the Wii U was designed as a home console unit, Nintendo's lack of clarity on this point led to a general assumption that the unit, principally the Wii U GamePad, was more like a tablet, overshadowing the Wii U's other features (such as dual-screen play modes). Nintendo also believed that some consumers had mistaken the Wii U GamePad as being an accessory for the existing Wii console, rather than being the flagship feature of an entirely new platform. Instead, for the Switch, Fils-Aimé said the company was "very aggressive and clearly communicating the proposition that it's a home console you can take on the go wherever and whenever you want".

For example, the October 2016 trailer (considered significantly unlike Nintendo's past marketing efforts, according to Bloomberg) was designed to show the various ways that the Switch can be used so that viewers would recognize that "each of its forms offer different play experiences for people to enjoy". Kimishima said that the intent of the trailer was to show that the device was aimed across all player demographics, showcasing features that core gamers would recognize and appreciate to carry this intent. A large amount of Nintendo's launch marketing for the console focused heavily on the launch game Breath of the Wild; Nintendo of America marketing executive, Nick Chavez, stated that the decision to showcase the new Zelda game was meant to promote it to both older viewers, who may have grown up with the franchise's earliest games and are accustomed to modern open world games, and to a new generation of players.

Nintendo aired its first-ever Super Bowl ad during the United States broadcast of Super Bowl LI. Set to the Imagine Dragons song "Believer", the ad showcased the various play modes with the Switch and its launch games, particularly Breath of the Wild, and upcoming releases; while an ad to celebrate the 20th anniversary of Pokémon was broadcast the previous year during Super Bowl 50, this ad was paid for by The Pokémon Company and not by Nintendo. Chavez said of the ad, "There's no bigger stage in the U.S. on which to showcase the platform. I think it speaks to our confidence in the system."

Additional television commercials followed the Super Bowl spot, which were to demonstrate Switch's use cases among different demographics, as well as "casual" and "core" gaming audiences. Such ad venues included the 2017 NCAA Division I men's basketball tournament, the 2017 Kids' Choice Awards, and on programming blocks for Nickelodeon, Adult Swim, and Comedy Central. Chavez emphasized that Nintendo's overall marketing for Switch was not be "just a six to eight week launch campaign", but "really a 15-month campaign for us, to say nothing of our plans for 2018".

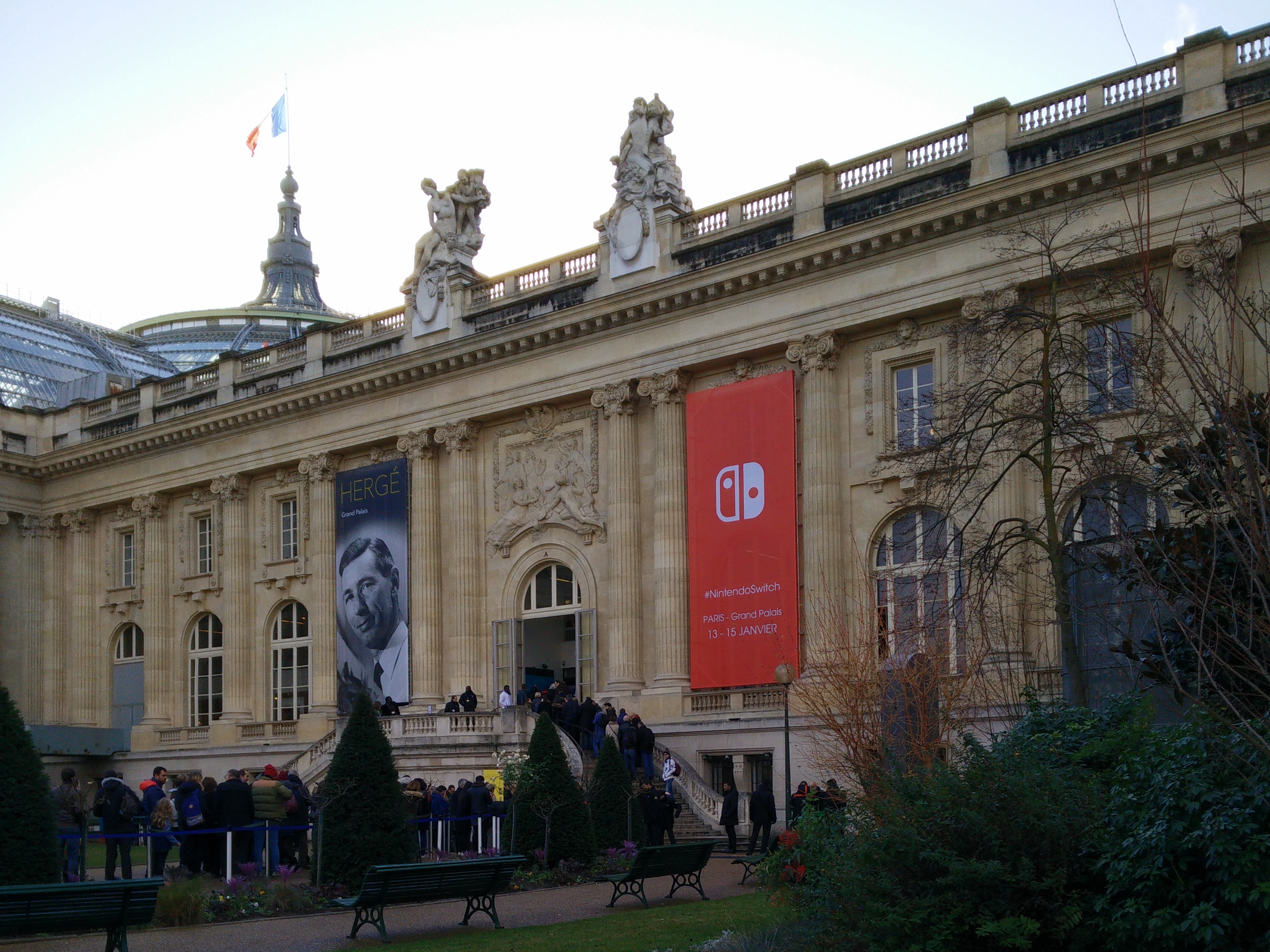
The Grand Palais in Paris during the Switch media event on January 15, 2017

In addition to advertising, Nintendo had planned several ways for players to try the system before its release through various "sampling events". Kimishima felt that it was important, particularly for "career gamers", for Nintendo to get the Switch into players' hands, so that players could understand how the system differs from Nintendo's previous offerings. Kimishima also said that the company was "running a guerrilla marketing program where we're just dashing around and trying to have as many events as possible and get it in the hands of players so they can experience the difference."

The North American and European press had special events on January 13, 2017, following the Tokyo presentation. Various Switch demonstration events were run in North America, Europe, and Japan during January and February 2017. Nintendo offered demonstrations of the Switch at gaming conferences including PAX South, South by Southwest, and RTX. Nintendo also promoted the Switch through an "Unexpected Places" campaign in February 2017, temporarily setting up living-room-style spaces in three United States locations and inviting fans and players, including John Cena, to try out the unit.

In June 2018, Nintendo announced it was partnering with Disney Channel to help produce Nintendo Switch Family Showdown, a televised competition where families competed in challenges around various Switch games in August 2018.

== Reception ==
=== Pre-release ===
Market analysts had a mixed response to the October 2016 announcement of the Nintendo Switch. Some expressed concern that the Switch failed to address the issues that led to poor Wii U sales, and was aimed at a small audience. Others were more upbeat, believing the Switch approach would fit in well in the Japanese market, where space for dedicated consoles and televisions are limited, and transition into Western ones. Stock research analyst John Taylor also approved of the company's decision to introduce the console prior to the holiday season, when Microsoft and Sony would attempt to attract casual gamers to their consoles.

Following the January 2017 press conference revealing the unit's pricing and release date, journalists expressed concern at the apparently high system price, comparable to the PlayStation 4 and Xbox One consoles but lacking some of their capabilities, the cost of the paid-for Nintendo Switch Online service, and the small number of games that were confirmed for launch. However, other analysts found that the pricing factors indicated the Switch was a more robust console, and would likely sell better than the Wii U, with The Legend of Zelda: Breath of the Wild being a key sales driver. These analysts also figured the Switch fills an appropriate gap in hardware for those seeking more complex gameplay that is not offered in tablet and mobile gaming but who did not need to purchase a powerful "boxy" console. Most analysts agreed that the success of the Switch depends on Nintendo's support and avoiding mistakes the company had made in marketing and promoting the Wii U.

Nintendo investors showed wariness at the Switch, as its stock price dropped in the months from the system's announcement up until its release. Analysts believed investors felt the Switch was very risky and were unsure if the unit would draw new audiences to Nintendo. Analysis firms estimated the Switch would have a slow start due to the risk of the system and high price, but could still clear up to 40 million units by 2020.

Game and hardware developers were more positive towards the Switch, seeing the system as "a more unifying experience between their handheld and console divisions", but expressed concern on unanswered hardware specifications, and how Nintendo would market the unit to draw in developers. Developer Hideo Kojima compared the notion of the Switch to his idea of "transfarring" that he presented in 2011, allowing players to take a game from a home platform to a portable one, which became the basis of Sony's cross-buy program. He said that the Switch was "an extension of that idea. The fact you can play something at home and take it outside, this is the gamer's dream. The Switch is an evolution of that." Bethesda's Todd Howard stated, "I think Nintendo is the only company that could pull something like this off", commenting on the Nintendo Switch's design and functionality. Phil Spencer, head of Microsoft's Xbox division, said he was impressed with Nintendo's ability to "state a bold vision and build a product that delivers on that vision".

Retailers were also generally positive with the Switch; GameStop CEO Paul Reines stated the unit was transformative in the market and would be a "game-changer" that could "expand the audience for gaming". Pre-orders were high, with Kimishima stating before launch that total pre-orders reached nearly the levels of units they had ready to ship for launch.

The October 2016 reveal trailer became Nintendo of America's most-viewed video on YouTube within 24 hours, and was the top trending video on YouTube for about a day.

=== Release ===
Upon release, the Switch was praised by reviewers for having a lot of potential, but they were underwhelmed by the limited number of games available at launch that did not show the full extent of the console's abilities. Reviewers also noted that the initial operating software and features were limited and included software bugs that, while likely to be fixed in time, marred the experience of the system. Even with the day-one update, there were numerous reports of hardware problems, in particular the Bluetooth connectivity of the Switch console with the Joy-Con (L) controller, and ease with which the console screen could be scratched. About a week after release, Fils-Aimé said the company is in "fact-finding mode" to try to diagnose these issues. In late March, Nintendo reported that the Joy-Con (L) desync issue was a "manufacturing variation" on a small number of the units, which could be easily fixed; as noted by CNET's Sean Hollister, Nintendo repaired affected controllers by placing a bit of conductive foam near the antenna within the unit to better shield it. Going forward, Nintendo said they do not anticipate any other problems with connectivity issues. Many users also reported issues with defective pixels on the LCD screen of the console, which Nintendo has stated "are normal and should not be considered a defect". Other companies in the video game industry such as Sony, Microsoft, Sega, Bethesda, Ubisoft and Unity Technologies congratulated Nintendo on the Switch, along with fast food companies such as Arby's and Domino's Pizza, which made a practice of posting game-inspired artworks on social media.

About six months after its release, Nintendo reported their usage statistics for the Switch. Using statistics collected by the system for the primary player on the console, they found that 30% of users operate the console in Handheld/Tabletop mode more than 80% of the time, slightly more than 50% of users operate the console in both TV mode and Handheld/Tabletop mode equally, with the remaining users preferring TV mode. Nintendo stated, "We can clearly see that consumers are playing to suit their own play styles." Nintendo also found that the majority of people who purchased the Switch in the United States are male consumers in their 20s and early 30s.

Following the implementation of firmware version 5.0.0, several Switch users began reporting that their consoles became unusable after having been docked within a third-party "portable" dock manufactured by Nyko. Nyko commented on the issue, stating that they were aware of the issue and thought it to be caused by the Switch's handling of A/V output, while Nintendo advised users against docking their systems inside unlicensed docking peripherals. After purchasing the dock at a Walmart store in Jacksonville, Florida, and losing usability of his console upon using the dock, Switch owner Michael Skiathitis filed a class action lawsuit against Nyko, alleging the dock to be "prone to causing numerous problems to the devices they are intended to support" against the knowledge of purchasers, as well as noting that Nyko had not put much effort into warning consumers about the issue. Other Switch owners reported having their consoles bricked upon using various other third-party docks, including models made by FastSnail and Insignia.

The Verge rated the Nintendo Switch Lite 8 out of 10 points, praising its improved battery life over the standard Nintendo Switch, as well as the design and the D-pad, but criticizing the lack of a TV mode and the fact that some games are not compatible with the base model alone. PC Magazine criticized the components used in the Switch Lite for their quality because just like the Joy-Con of the original Nintendo Switch, the analog sticks of the console are also susceptible to drifting. "Today's generation is focused more on hand-held devices and any app that is on their television screen", said game developer Tyrone Evans Clark who was being interviewed by Lifewire. Jon Porter of TechRadar wrote, "The Switch is a significantly different device from what we've seen prior, and the handheld nature of the console provides the best of both worlds." In 2021, PCMag wrote, "As a handheld game system, the Switch feels large but comfortable. It's thicker than a tablet but much thinner than the Wii U gamepad, and far more natural to hold. It's 9.4 inches wide with both Joy-Con attached, making it too cumbersome to easily put in a pocket, but it can fit in most bags without a problem. I bring my Switch with me to work every day on the subway. It fits comfortably in my bag when I'm not playing it, and doesn't feel overwhelmingly bulky when I play it while standing." In 2024, Richard Priday of Tom's Guide wrote, "Even though the Nintendo Switch is now several years old, it's still just as popular as its newer, more powerful rivals. With some of the best game franchises as exclusives and some unique hardware, it's a console you can't ignore."

=== Sales ===
Switch sales have been strongly tied to sales of Nintendo's first-party games, with nine having sold over twenty million copies each: The Legend of Zelda: Breath of the Wild, Mario Kart 8 Deluxe, Super Mario Odyssey, Super Mario Party, Super Smash Bros. Ultimate, Pokémon Sword and Shield, Animal Crossing: New Horizons, Pokémon Scarlet and Violet, and The Legend of Zelda: Tears of the Kingdom.

==== Initial launch ====
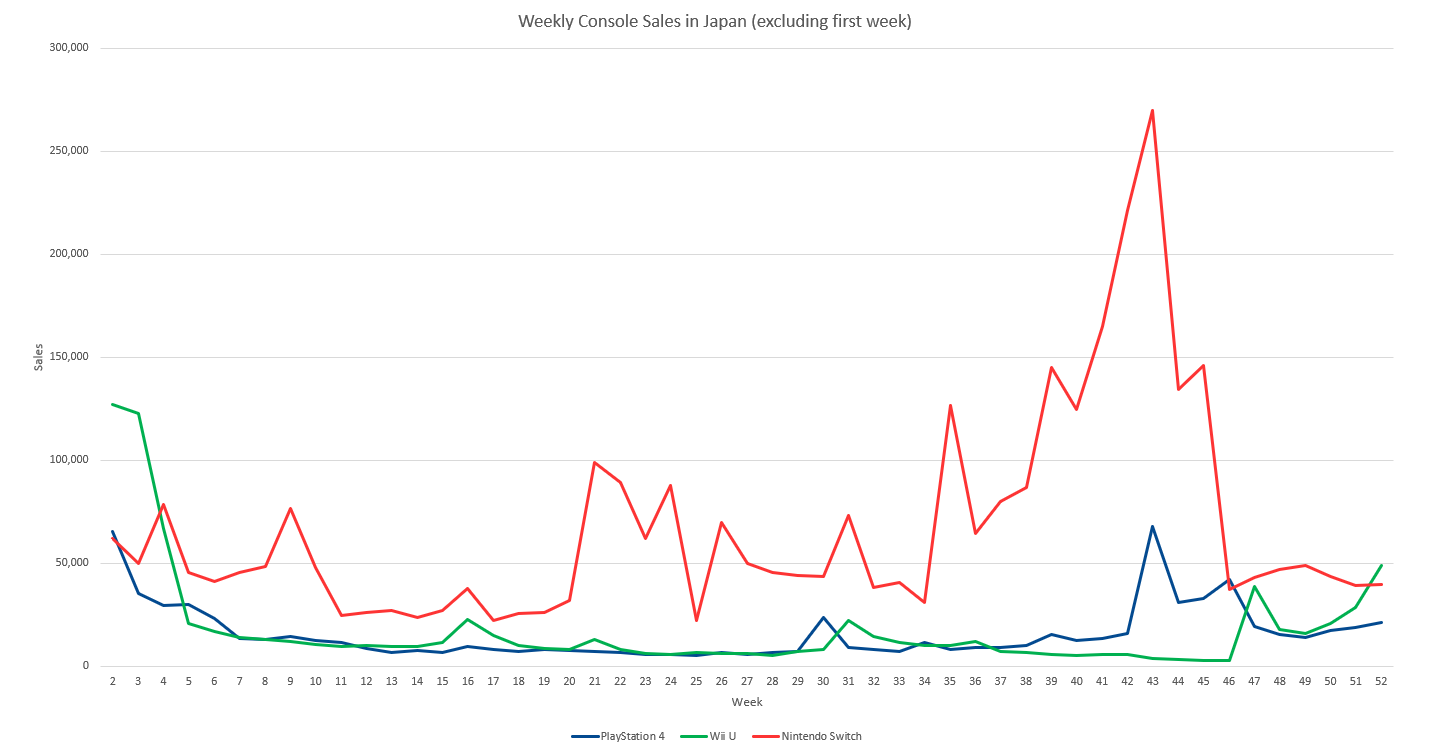
First-year sales of the Switch (red line), Wii U (green), and PlayStation 4 (blue) in Japan

Initial sales of the Switch were strong, with Nintendo reporting that based on its first week's numbers, it was the company's fastest-selling console. In Japan, first weekend sales exceeded 330,000 units, which was on par with the PlayStation 4 during its launch period. Sales during this initial period were strong in the United States, United Kingdom, France, and Germany. Media Create estimated that more than 500,000 Switch units were sold in Japan within its first month, beating out the PlayStation 4 to this figure.

Nintendo issued the Switch's first month's performance in their 2016 fiscal year results (which ended March 31, 2017), reporting that more than 2.74 million units had been sold worldwide, exceeding their target of two million. Retailer GameStop reported that initial sales of the Switch were "phenomenal" and on track to surpass the Wii U based on their historical sales data, with merchandising director Eric Bright saying the Switch has had "one of the highest attach rates of software and accessories to a device that we've seen in a long time". Retailer GameStop reported significant growth in hardware sales in its first quarter of 2017 due primarily to the Switch, while Best Buy saw an unexpected increase in their hardware sales in its first quarter of 2017 buoyed by the popularity of the Switch. Console sales in Japan, which had been languishing due to the strength of the mobile game market, saw its first annual growth of 14.8% in 2017 due to the release of the Switch. Physical sales for Switch games were at 5.46 million worldwide in its first month, with 2.76 million copies of Breath of the Wild for the Switch making up nearly half of those sales. On Breath of the Wild's nearly 1-to-1 sales with the Switch console, Nintendo's Kimishima said, "This high of an attach rate is more or less unprecedented".

The large sales within the first month forced Nintendo to increase their production capacity, and to temporarily use air freight to ship Switch units instead of their usual overseas shipment, costing an estimated $45 per console, rather than the less-costly overseas shipment. With these changes, Nintendo projected that it would sell at least 10 million Switch consoles during the 2017 fiscal year, alongside 35 million games. Kimishima stated that having a Switch user base of 10 million "will give publishers and the rest of our business partners a sense that the future of Nintendo Switch is more promising" and spur further game development for the platform. Kimishima said that a key goal in their production ramp up would be to make sure they have enough Switch inventory near the end of 2017 for holiday sales, as to avoid the issue with Wii shortages that occurred during its first holiday-season period, while balancing the near-term high demand. According to Kimishima, Nintendo now believed that if they could reach 10 million in Switch sales in 2017, they expected the Switch would have lifetime sales comparable to the Wii, which had sold over 100 million units in its lifetime.

The Switch continued to show strong sales throughout its first year of release. In its financial report released in October 2017 for the quarter ending September 30, 2017, Nintendo reported worldwide sales of the Switch at 7.63 million, with the expectation to sell more than 14 million by the end of its current financial year, exceeding the Wii U's lifetime 13.56 million sales. Five games had achieved at least one million in sales by this point: Breath of the Wild (4.7M), Mario Kart 8 Deluxe (4.42M), Splatoon 2 (3.61M), 1-2 Switch (1.37M), and Arms (1.35M). Shortly after this financial report, Nintendo reported that Super Mario Odyssey for the Switch sold more than two million copies within three days of its release on October 27, 2017. Following this financial report, the Wall Street Journal asserted that Nintendo anticipated to continue ramping production of the Switch in its 2018 fiscal year, with plans to produce between 25 and 30 million units that year or more depending on the 2017 holiday sales. During the November 2017 Black Friday, Small Business Saturday, and Cyber Monday sales that kicked off the holiday shopping season in North America, Adobe Digital Insights' analysis showed the Switch was one of the top-five selling items, outpacing the PlayStation 4 or Xbox One. NPD Group adjusted their future performance of the Switch to follow more closely with the Wii's lifetime sales rather than the Wii U's.

On December 12, 2017, the company announced the system had sold over 10 million units worldwide, having reached its sales goal for the 2017 fiscal year within nine months. Nintendo raised its Switch sales expectation to 14 million units for the fiscal year. Shortly after this announcement, Kimishima said that Nintendo has a target of 20 million units sold within the console's second year, along with releasing new games that "enables new ways of playing" to continue the sales momentum.

Based on its first year sales, the Switch was considered to be the fastest-selling game console in history in many regions. With 2017 year end Japanese sales data from Media Create, the Switch became the fastest-selling home console in Japan in first year sales, with its total sales of 3.2 million units exceeding the 3.0 million units of the PlayStation 2 during its first year of release, while Famitsu reported that these sales had eclipsed the lifetime sales of the Wii U in the country, and helped to support the first growth in sales within Japan's console market in eleven years. Nintendo of America also reported that with 4.8 million units sold in the United States by the end of 2017, 1.5 million units in December 2017 alone, the Switch was the fastest-selling console in the United States in its first 10 months, outpacing the Wii's performance of 4 million units in the same time period. Similarly, the Switch was the fastest-selling console in France, having sold 911,000 units through the end of 2017, according to Nintendo France. The Switch was also the fastest-selling console in Canada, having shipped 400,000 units in its first 10 months, narrowly outpacing the Wii's performance of 392,000 units in the same time period, according to TechVibes. According to analysis firm GBH Insights, the Nintendo Switch was the fifth-best-selling technology product in 2017. As of January 2018, the Switch has sold more than 300,000 units in Spain, surpassing the total lifetime sales of one of its competitors, the Xbox One, in the region. The Switch sold 8.7 million units in the United States in its first 21 months of availability, surpassing the sales of Xbox One and PlayStation 4 during their first 21 months in the same region. By May 2019, the Switch had overtaken the PS4's lifetime sales in Japan.

As of February 2026, the Nintendo Switch has sold over 155 million units, surpassing the Nintendo DS to become Nintendo's best-selling console.

==== Lifetime units shipped ====
Life-to-date number of units shipped, millions (Note: Numbers are total of Nintendo Switch, Nintendo Switch Lite, and Nintendo Switch OLED units. See footnotes for quarters from September 2019 onward for partition of sales between the Switch and Switch Lite and footnotes for quarters from December 2021 onward for partition of sales between all units.)
| Date | Japan | | Americas | | Europe (Note: European sales were counted under "Other" until the quarter ending June 30, 2019.) | | Other | | Total | | Attach rate (Note: Given as the ratio of total software sales to total hardware sales) |
| Date | Hardware | Software | Hardware | Software | Hardware | Software | Hardware | Software | Hardware | Software | Attach rate |
|---|---|---|---|---|---|---|---|---|---|---|---|
| 2017-03-31 | 0.60 | 0.89 | 1.20 | 2.86 | N/A | N/A | 0.94 | 1.71 | 2.74 | 5.46 | 1.99 |
| 2017-06-30 | 1.12 | 2.45 | 1.95 | 6.49 | N/A | N/A | 1.63 | 4.66 | 4.70 | 13.60 | ▲2.89 |
| 2017-09-30 | 1.95 | 5.26 | 3.11 | 12.25 | N/A | N/A | 2.56 | 9.97 | 7.63 | 27.48 | ▲3.60 |
| 2017-12-31 | 3.72 | 9.82 | 5.94 | 23.65 | N/A | N/A | 5.20 | 19.10 | 14.86 | 52.57 | ▼3.53 |
| 2018-03-31 | 4.38 | 13.15 | 7.14 | 30.37 | N/A | N/A | 6.27 | 25.44 | 17.79 | 68.97 | ▲3.87 |
| 2018-06-30 | 4.89 | 16.10 | 7.81 | 38.74 | N/A | N/A | 6.97 | 32.09 | 19.67 | 86.93 | ▲4.41 |
| 2018-09-30 | 5.52 | 20.31 | 9.13 | 49.97 | N/A | N/A | 8.20 | 40.82 | 22.86 | 111.10 | ▲4.86 |
| 2018-12-31 | 7.74 | 30.33 | 12.94 | 73.85 | N/A | N/A | 11.60 | 59.42 | 32.27 | 163.61 | ▲5.07 |
| 2019-03-31 | 8.23 | 34.64 | 14.01 | 84.31 | N/A | N/A | 12.50 | 68.57 | 34.74 | 187.25 | ▲5.39 |
| 2019-06-30 | 8.76 | 39.05 | 14.83 | 94.47 | 9.60 | 62.46 | 3.69 | 14.15 | 36.87 | 210.13 | ▲5.69 |
| 2019-09-30 | 10.00 (Note: Nintendo Switch: 9.61 million, Nintendo Switch Lite: 0.39 million) | 44.93 | 16.64 (Note: Nintendo Switch: 15.84 million, Nintendo Switch Lite: 0.80 million) | 110.22 | 10.86 (Note: Nintendo Switch: 10.33 million, Nintendo Switch Lite: 0.54 million) | 74.43 | 4.17 (Note: Nintendo Switch: 3.94 million, Nintendo Switch Lite: 0.22 million) | 16.43 | 41.67 (Note: Nintendo Switch: 39.72 million, Nintendo Switch Lite: 1.95 million) | 246.01 | ▲5.90 |
| 2019-12-31 | 12.42 (Note: Nintendo Switch: 11.06 million, Nintendo Switch Lite: 1.36 million) | 57.34 | 20.87 (Note: Nintendo Switch: 18.78 million, Nintendo Switch Lite: 2.09 million) | 138.63 | 13.88 (Note: Nintendo Switch: 12.60 million, Nintendo Switch Lite: 1.28 million) | 94.01 | 5.32 (Note: Nintendo Switch: 4.86 million, Nintendo Switch Lite: 0.46 million) | 20.68 | 52.48 (Note: Nintendo Switch: 47.30 million, Nintendo Switch Lite: 5.19 million) | 310.65 | ▲5.92 |
| 2020-03-31 | 13.44 (Note: Nintendo Switch: 11.44 million, Nintendo Switch Lite: 2.00 million) | 67.20 | 22.12 (Note: Nintendo Switch: 19.79 million, Nintendo Switch Lite: 2.33 million) | 158.59 | 14.43 (Note: Nintendo Switch: 13.09 million, Nintendo Switch Lite: 1.34 million) | 105.92 | 5.78 (Note: Nintendo Switch: 5.25 million, Nintendo Switch Lite: 0.53 million) | 24.54 | 55.77 (Note: Nintendo Switch: 49.57 million, Nintendo Switch Lite: 6.19 million) | 356.24 | ▲6.38 |
| 2020-06-30 | 14.59 (Note: Nintendo Switch: 12.23 million, Nintendo Switch Lite: 2.36 million) | 77.21 | 24.41 (Note: Nintendo Switch: 20.50 million, Nintendo Switch Lite: 3.61 million) | 180.07 | 16.04 (Note: Nintendo Switch: 13.91 million, Nintendo Switch Lite: 2.13 million) | 120.22 | 6.70 (Note: Nintendo Switch: 5.98 million, Nintendo Switch Lite: 0.72 million) | 29.16 | 61.44 (Note: Nintendo Switch: 52.63 million, Nintendo Switch Lite: 8.82 million) | 406.67 | ▲6.62 |
| 2020-09-30 | 16.17 (Note: Nintendo Switch: 13.37 million, Nintendo Switch Lite: 2.80 million) | 84.98 | 26.58 (Note: Nintendo Switch: 22.38 million, Nintendo Switch Lite: 4.20 million) | 204.18 | 17.73 (Note: Nintendo Switch: 15.25 million, Nintendo Switch Lite: 2.48 million) | 134.44 | 7.81 (Note: Nintendo Switch: 6.93 million, Nintendo Switch Lite: 0.88 million) | 32.88 | 68.30 (Note: Nintendo Switch: 57.93 million, Nintendo Switch Lite: 10.36 million) | 456.49 | ▲6.68 |
| 2020-12-31 | 18.88 (Note: Nintendo Switch: 15.46 million, Nintendo Switch Lite: 3.42 million) | 98.89 | 31.17 (Note: Nintendo Switch: 25.40 million, Nintendo Switch Lite: 5.78 million) | 238.12 | 20.70 (Note: Nintendo Switch: 17.35 million, Nintendo Switch Lite: 3.36 million) | 158.29 | 9.11 (Note: Nintendo Switch: 8.14 million, Nintendo Switch Lite: 0.97 million) | 37.04 | 79.87 (Note: Nintendo Switch: 66.34 million, Nintendo Switch Lite: 13.53 million) | 532.34 | ▼6.67 |
| 2021-03-31 | 20.04 (Note: Nintendo Switch: 16.22 million, Nintendo Switch Lite: 3.81 million) | 112.22 | 33.27 (Note: Nintendo Switch: 26.86 million, Nintendo Switch Lite: 6.41 million) | 261.00 | 21.58 (Note: Nintendo Switch: 18.11 million, Nintendo Switch Lite: 3.47 million) | 172.15 | 9.71 (Note: Nintendo Switch: 8.70 million, Nintendo Switch Lite: 1.01 million) | 41.74 | 84.59 (Note: Nintendo Switch: 69.89 million, Nintendo Switch Lite: 14.70 million) | 587.12 | ▲6.94 |
| 2021-06-30 | 21.20 (Note: Nintendo Switch: 17.05 million, Nintendo Switch Lite: 4.15 million) | 120.35 | 34.86 (Note: Nintendo Switch: 27.96 million, Nintendo Switch Lite: 6.90 million) | 283.35 | 22.66 (Note: Nintendo Switch: 18.93 million, Nintendo Switch Lite: 3.73 million) | 183.51 | 10.33 (Note: Nintendo Switch: 9.26 million, Nintendo Switch Lite: 1.06 million) | 45.20 | 89.04 (Note: Nintendo Switch: 73.20 million, Nintendo Switch Lite: 15.84 million) | 632.40 | ▲7.10 |
| 2021-09-30 | 22.06 (Note: Nintendo Switch: 17.80 million, Nintendo Switch Lite: 4.26 million) | 128.35 | 36.31 (Note: Nintendo Switch: 29.01 million, Nintendo Switch Lite: 7.30 million) | 306.13 | 23.60 (Note: Nintendo Switch: 19.74 million, Nintendo Switch Lite: 3.86 million) | 197.78 | 10.89 (Note: Nintendo Switch: 9.79 million, Nintendo Switch Lite: 1.10 million) | 48.74 | 92.87 (Note: Nintendo Switch: 76.34 million, Nintendo Switch Lite: 16.53 million) | 681.00 | ▲7.33 |
| 2021-12-31 | 24.36 (Note: Nintendo Switch: 18.57 million, Nintendo Switch Lite: 4.72 million, Nintendo Switch OLED: 1.07 million) | 143.20 | 40.12 (Note: Nintendo Switch: 30.96 million, Nintendo Switch Lite: 7.74 million, Nintendo Switch OLED: 1.41 million) | 345.64 | 26.98 (Note: Nintendo Switch: 21.86 million, Nintendo Switch Lite: 4.21 million, Nintendo Switch OLED: 0.91 million) | 223.01 | 12.09 (Note: Nintendo Switch: 10.28 million, Nintendo Switch Lite: 1.19 million, Nintendo Switch OLED: 0.61 million) | 54.56 | 103.54 (Note: Nintendo Switch: 81.68 million, Nintendo Switch Lite: 17.87 million, Nintendo Switch OLED: 3.99 million) | 766.41 | ▲7.40 |
| 2022-03-31 | 25.23 (Note: Nintendo Switch: 18.78 million, Nintendo Switch Lite: 4.84 million, Nintendo Switch OLED: 1.61 million) | 154.36 | 42.03 (Note: Nintendo Switch: 32.08 million, Nintendo Switch Lite: 8.01 million, Nintendo Switch OLED: 1.94 million) | 369.27 | 27.60 (Note: Nintendo Switch: 22.15 million, Nintendo Switch Lite: 4.33 million, Nintendo Switch OLED: 1.12 million) | 237.93 | 12.79 (Note: Nintendo Switch: 10.44 million, Nintendo Switch Lite: 1.23 million, Nintendo Switch OLED: 1.13 million) | 60.62 | 107.65 (Note: Nintendo Switch: 83.45 million, Nintendo Switch Lite: 18.40 million, Nintendo Switch OLED: 5.80 million) | 822.18 | ▲7.63 |
| 2022-06-30 | 25.95 (Note: Nintendo Switch: 19.01 million, Nintendo Switch Lite: 4.94 million, Nintendo Switch OLED: 2.00 million) | 162.43 | 43.30 (Note: Nintendo Switch: 32.57 million, Nintendo Switch Lite: 8.34 million, Nintendo Switch OLED: 2.40 million) | 386.42 | 28.70 (Note: Nintendo Switch: 22.68 million, Nintendo Switch Lite: 4.45 million, Nintendo Switch OLED: 1.58 million) | 249.45 | 13.13 (Note: Nintendo Switch: 10.52 million, Nintendo Switch Lite: 1.27 million, Nintendo Switch OLED: 1.34 million) | 65.29 | 111.08 (Note: Nintendo Switch: 84.77 million, Nintendo Switch Lite: 18.99 million, Nintendo Switch OLED: 7.32 million) | 863.59 | ▲7.77 |
| 2022-09-30 | 26.96 (Note: Nintendo Switch: 19.22 million, Nintendo Switch Lite: 4.99 million, Nintendo Switch OLED: 2.74 million) | 175.09 | 44.59 (Note: Nintendo Switch: 32.99 million, Nintendo Switch Lite: 8.53 million, Nintendo Switch OLED: 3.07 million) | 407.97 | 29.29 (Note: Nintendo Switch: 22.87 million, Nintendo Switch Lite: 4.51 million, Nintendo Switch OLED: 1.91 million) | 266.39 | 13.49 (Note: Nintendo Switch: 10.59 million, Nintendo Switch Lite: 1.29 million, Nintendo Switch OLED: 1.62 million) | 69.15 | 114.33 (Note: Nintendo Switch: 85.67 million, Nintendo Switch Lite: 19.32 million, Nintendo Switch OLED: 9.34 million) | 917.59 | ▲8.02 |
| 2022-12-31 | 29.05 (Note: Nintendo Switch: 19.67 million, Nintendo Switch Lite: 5.29 million, Nintendo Switch OLED: 4.09 million) | 192.62 | 47.66 (Note: Nintendo Switch: 34.29 million, Nintendo Switch Lite: 9.10 million, Nintendo Switch OLED: 4.26 million) | 437.37 | 31.71 (Note: Nintendo Switch: 23.96 million, Nintendo Switch Lite: 4.67 million, Nintendo Switch OLED: 3.08 million) | 289.47 | 14.15 (Note: Nintendo Switch: 10.75 million, Nintendo Switch Lite: 1.33 million, Nintendo Switch OLED: 2.06 million) | 74.84 | 122.55 (Note: Nintendo Switch: 88.67 million, Nintendo Switch Lite: 20.40 million, Nintendo Switch OLED: 13.49 million) | 994.30 | ▲8.11 |
| 2023-03-31 | 29.59 (Note: Nintendo Switch: 19.73 million, Nintendo Switch Lite: 5.41 million, Nintendo Switch OLED: 4.45 million) | 200.15 | 49.00 (Note: Nintendo Switch: 34.75 million, Nintendo Switch Lite: 9.42 million, Nintendo Switch OLED: 4.82 million) | 456.27 | 32.58 (Note: Nintendo Switch: 24.26 million, Nintendo Switch Lite: 4.82 million, Nintendo Switch OLED: 3.50 million) | 300.91 | 14.44 (Note: Nintendo Switch: 10.84 million, Nintendo Switch Lite: 1.36 million, Nintendo Switch OLED: 2.25 million) | 78.82 | 125.62 (Note: Nintendo Switch: 89.58 million, Nintendo Switch Lite: 21.02 million, Nintendo Switch OLED: 15.02 million) | 1,036.15 | ▲8.24 |
| 2023-06-30 | 30.79 (Note: Nintendo Switch: 19.89 million, Nintendo Switch Lite: 5.57 million, Nintendo Switch OLED: 5.33 million) | 209.18 | 50.18 (Note: Nintendo Switch: 34.91 million, Nintendo Switch Lite: 9.58 million, Nintendo Switch OLED: 5.70 million) | 478.97 | 33.53 (Note: Nintendo Switch: 24.47 million, Nintendo Switch Lite: 4.89 million, Nintendo Switch OLED: 4.16 million) | 314.23 | 15.02 (Note: Nintendo Switch: 10.96 million, Nintendo Switch Lite: 1.40 million, Nintendo Switch OLED: 2.66 million) | 85.97 | 129.53 (Note: Nintendo Switch: 90.23 million, Nintendo Switch Lite: 21.45 million, Nintendo Switch OLED: 17.85 million) | 1,088.35 | ▲8.40 |
| 2023-09-30 | 31.77 (Note: Nintendo Switch: 20.03 million, Nintendo Switch Lite: 5.71 million, Nintendo Switch OLED: 6.04 million) | 217.52 | 51.03 (Note: Nintendo Switch: 35.12 million, Nintendo Switch Lite: 9.80 million, Nintendo Switch OLED: 6.11 million) | 498.39 | 34.15 (Note: Nintendo Switch: 24.67 million, Nintendo Switch Lite: 4.96 million, Nintendo Switch OLED: 4.52 million) | 327.88 | 15.51 (Note: Nintendo Switch: 11.02 million, Nintendo Switch Lite: 1.45 million, Nintendo Switch OLED: 3.04 million) | 89.43 | 132.46 (Note: Nintendo Switch: 90.83 million, Nintendo Switch Lite: 21.92 million, Nintendo Switch OLED: 19.71 million) | 1,133.23 | ▲8.55 |
| 2023-12-31 | 33.34 (Note: Nintendo Switch: 20.26 million, Nintendo Switch Lite: 6.05 million, Nintendo Switch OLED: 7.03 million) | 232.73 | 53.85 (Note: Nintendo Switch: 36.22 million, Nintendo Switch Lite: 10.46 million, Nintendo Switch OLED: 7.17 million) | 524.77 | 36.15 (Note: Nintendo Switch: 25.43 million, Nintendo Switch Lite: 5.21 million, Nintendo Switch OLED: 5.51 million) | 348.61 | 16.03 (Note: Nintendo Switch: 11.08 million, Nintendo Switch Lite: 1.48 million, Nintendo Switch OLED: 3.47 million) | 93.99 | 139.36 (Note: Nintendo Switch: 92.98 million, Nintendo Switch Lite: 23.20 million, Nintendo Switch OLED: 23.18 million) | 1,200.10 | ▲8.61 |
| 2024-03-31 | 34.01 (Note: Nintendo Switch: 20.34 million, Nintendo Switch Lite: 6.17 million, Nintendo Switch OLED: 7.50 million) | 239.93 | 54.52 (Note: Nintendo Switch: 36.45 million, Nintendo Switch Lite: 10.61 million, Nintendo Switch OLED: 7.47 million) | 540.18 | 36.49 (Note: Nintendo Switch: 25.55 million, Nintendo Switch Lite: 5.25 million, Nintendo Switch OLED: 5.69 million) | 358.32 | 16.30 (Note: Nintendo Switch: 11.11 million, Nintendo Switch Lite: 1.51 million, Nintendo Switch OLED: 3.68 million) | 97.39 | 141.32 (Note: Nintendo Switch: 93.45 million, Nintendo Switch Lite: 23.54 million, Nintendo Switch OLED: 24.34 million) | 1,235.82 | ▲8.74 |
| 2024-06-30 | 34.80 (Note: Nintendo Switch: 20.45 million, Nintendo Switch Lite: 6.30 million, Nintendo Switch OLED: 8.05 million) | 246.76 | 55.17 (Note: Nintendo Switch: 36.69 million, Nintendo Switch Lite: 10.73 million, Nintendo Switch OLED: 7.75 million) | 552.99 | 36.89 (Note: Nintendo Switch: 25.69 million, Nintendo Switch Lite: 5.32 million, Nintendo Switch OLED: 5.89 million) | 366.93 | 16.56 (Note: Nintendo Switch: 11.13 million, Nintendo Switch Lite: 1.53 million, Nintendo Switch OLED: 3.90 million) | 99.79 | 143.42 (Note: Nintendo Switch: 93.97 million, Nintendo Switch Lite: 23.87 million, Nintendo Switch OLED: 25.58 million) | 1,266.46 | ▲8.83 |
| 2024-09-30 | 35.62 (Note: Nintendo Switch: 20.60 million, Nintendo Switch Lite: 6.51 million, Nintendo Switch OLED: 8.52 million) | 255.45 | 56.11 (Note: Nintendo Switch: 36.99 million, Nintendo Switch Lite: 10.94 million, Nintendo Switch OLED: 8.18 million) | 569.45 | 37.52 (Note: Nintendo Switch: 25.96 million, Nintendo Switch Lite: 5.49 million, Nintendo Switch OLED: 6.07 million) | 378.76 | 16.79 (Note: Nintendo Switch: 11.16 million, Nintendo Switch Lite: 1.57 million, Nintendo Switch OLED: 4.07 million) | 102.43 | 146.04 (Note: Nintendo Switch: 94.70 million, Nintendo Switch Lite: 24.51 million, Nintendo Switch OLED: 26.83 million) | 1,306.10 | ▲8.94 |
| 2024-12-31 | 36.82 (Note: Nintendo Switch: 20.83 million, Nintendo Switch Lite: 6.79 million, Nintendo Switch OLED: 9.20 million) | 268.81 | 57.83 (Note: Nintendo Switch: 37.70 million, Nintendo Switch Lite: 11.29 million, Nintendo Switch OLED: 8.83 million) | 591.06 | 39.00 (Note: Nintendo Switch: 26.47 million, Nintendo Switch Lite: 5.60 million, Nintendo Switch OLED: 6.92 million) | 395.90 | 17.22 (Note: Nintendo Switch: 11.18 million, Nintendo Switch Lite: 1.59 million, Nintendo Switch OLED: 4.45 million) | 106.03 | 150.86 (Note: Nintendo Switch: 96.18 million, Nintendo Switch Lite: 25.27 million, Nintendo Switch OLED: 29.40 million) | 1,359.80 | ▲9.01 |
| 2025-03-31 | 37.20 (Note: Nintendo Switch: 20.89 million, Nintendo Switch Lite: 6.86 Million, Nintendo Switch OLED: 9.45 Million) | 273.12 | 58.31 (Note: Nintendo Switch: 37.83 million, Nintendo Switch Lite: 11.39 Million, Nintendo Switch OLED: 9.09 Million) | 605.03 | 39.20 (Note: Nintendo Switch: 26.53 million, Nintendo Switch Lite: 5.63 Million, Nintendo Switch OLED: 7.03 Million) | 404.72 | 17.41 (Note: Nintendo Switch: 11.19 million, Nintendo Switch Lite: 1.60 Million, Nintendo Switch OLED: 4.62 Million) | 108.35 | 152.12 (Note: Nintendo Switch: 96.44 million, Nintendo Switch Lite: 25.59 Million, Nintendo Switch OLED: 30.19 Million) | 1,391.23 | ▲9.15 |
| 2025-06-30 | 37.53 (Note: Nintendo Switch: 20.94 million, Nintendo Switch Lite: 6.96 Million, Nintendo Switch OLED: 9.63 Million) | 278.56 | 58.61 (Note: Nintendo Switch: 37.94 million, Nintendo Switch Lite: 11.48 Million, Nintendo Switch OLED: 9.19 Million) | 615.25 | 39.37 (Note: Nintendo Switch: 26.59 million, Nintendo Switch Lite: 5.66 Million, Nintendo Switch OLED: 7.12 Million) | 411.63 | 17.58 (Note: Nintendo Switch: 11.19 million, Nintendo Switch Lite: 1.61 Million, Nintendo Switch OLED: 4.78 Million) | 110.19 | 153.10 (Note: Nintendo Switch: 96.66 million, Nintendo Switch Lite: 25.72 Million, Nintendo Switch OLED: 30.72 Million) | 1,415.63 | ▲9.24 |
| 2025-09-30 | 37.77 (Note: Nintendo Switch: 20.99 million, Nintendo Switch Lite: 7.05 Million, Nintendo Switch OLED: 9.74 Million) | 285.42 | 58.98 (Note: Nintendo Switch: 38.13 million, Nintendo Switch Lite: 11.54 Million, Nintendo Switch OLED: 9.30 Million) | 630.63 | 39.56 (Note: Nintendo Switch: 26.67 million, Nintendo Switch Lite: 5.71 Million, Nintendo Switch OLED: 7.17 Million) | 423.82 | 17.70 (Note: Nintendo Switch: 11.20 million, Nintendo Switch Lite: 1.62 Million, Nintendo Switch OLED: 4.88 Million) | 112.93 | 154.01 (Note: Nintendo Switch: 96.99 million, Nintendo Switch Lite: 25.92 Million, Nintendo Switch OLED: 31.10 Million) | 1,452.79 | ▲9.43 |
| 2025-12-31 | 38.14 (Note: Nintendo Switch: 21.06 million, Nintendo Switch Lite: 7.16 Million, Nintendo Switch OLED: 9.92 Million) | 296.24 | 59.45 (Note: Nintendo Switch: 38.31 million, Nintendo Switch Lite: 11.69 Million, Nintendo Switch OLED: 9.45 Million) | 650.51 | 39.91 (Note: Nintendo Switch: 26.85 million, Nintendo Switch Lite: 5.79 Million, Nintendo Switch OLED: 7.28 Million) | 436.87 | 17.87 (Note: Nintendo Switch: 11.21 million, Nintendo Switch Lite: 1.63 Million, Nintendo Switch OLED: 5.03 Million) | 112.93 | 155.37 (Note: Nintendo Switch: 97.42 million, Nintendo Switch Lite: 26.27 Million, Nintendo Switch OLED: 31.68 Million) | 1,500.16 | ▲9.65 |
| 2026-03-31 | 38.34 (Note: Nintendo Switch: 21.10 million, Nintendo Switch Lite: 7.23 Million, Nintendo Switch OLED: 10.01 Million) | 302.01 | 59.61 (Note: Nintendo Switch: 38.37 million, Nintendo Switch Lite: 11.75 Million, Nintendo Switch OLED: 9.48 Million) | 662.19 | 40.03 (Note: Nintendo Switch: 26.91 million, Nintendo Switch Lite: 5.81 Million, Nintendo Switch OLED: 7.31 Million) | 443.87 | 17.94 (Note: Nintendo Switch: 11.21 million, Nintendo Switch Lite: 1.64 Million, Nintendo Switch OLED: 5.10 Million) | 120.07 | 155.92 (Note: Nintendo Switch: 97.59 million, Nintendo Switch Lite: 26.43 Million, Nintendo Switch OLED: 31.91 Million) | 1,528.14 | ▲9.80 |
| 2026-06-30 | 38.55 (Note: Nintendo Switch: 21.14 million, Nintendo Switch Lite: 7.32 Million, Nintendo Switch OLED: 10.10 Million) | 310.55 | 59.80 (Note: Nintendo Switch: 38.43 million, Nintendo Switch Lite: 11.79 Million, Nintendo Switch OLED: 9.58 Million) | 676.43 | 40.14 (Note: Nintendo Switch: 26.96 million, Nintendo Switch Lite: 5.84 Million, Nintendo Switch OLED: 7.34 Million) | 451.78 | 18.09 (Note: Nintendo Switch: 11.22 million, Nintendo Switch Lite: 1.65 Million, Nintendo Switch OLED: 5.22 Million) | 123.19 | 156.59 (Note: Nintendo Switch: 97.75 million, Nintendo Switch Lite: 26.61 Million, Nintendo Switch OLED: 32.23 Million) | 1,561.95 | ▲9.97 |
| 2026-09-30 | 38.67 (Note: Nintendo Switch: 21.15 million, Nintendo Switch Lite: 7.38 Million, Nintendo Switch OLED: 10.14 Million) | 317.87 | 60.13 (Note: Nintendo Switch: 38.55 million, Nintendo Switch Lite: 11.82 Million, Nintendo Switch OLED: 9.75 Million) | 689.86 | 40.22 (Note: Nintendo Switch: 27.01 million, Nintendo Switch Lite: 5.86 Million, Nintendo Switch OLED: 7.36 Million) | 460.22 | 18.18 (Note: Nintendo Switch: 11.24 million, Nintendo Switch Lite: 1.65 Million, Nintendo Switch OLED: 5.29 Million) | 125.92 | 157.20 (Note: Nintendo Switch: 97.75 million, Nintendo Switch Lite: 26.61 Million, Nintendo Switch OLED: 32.23 Million) | 1,593.87 | ▲10.14 |

As of June 30, 2025, Nintendo has shipped 153.10 million Switch units, with over 96.6 million original Switch units, 25.72 million Switch Lite units, and 30.72 million Switch OLED units. It is Nintendo's best-selling home video game console of all time. (Note: Although the Switch is a hybrid game console, Nintendo refers to it as "a home video game system that can also be used as a handheld".) The Switch has surpassed lifetime sales of all but one Nintendo game console after the Nintendo DS. By that point, its sales place it third among all game consoles, behind the DS and the PlayStation 2. Since October 2020, the Switch had been the highest selling console in the United States for 22 consecutive months, starting from December 2018, taking the record from the Xbox 360 which stood for 21 months (August 2011 – April 2013). In the United States, the Switch had remained the best-selling console on monthly sales based on NPD Group data for 33 months from November 2018 through August 2021, with the PlayStation 5 breaking its streak in September 2021.

In the company's Q4 fiscal earnings report ending on December 21, 2019, Nintendo's president, Shuntaro Furukawa, said that about 30% of the sales of the Switch Lite were from existing owners of the full-size Switch console, making the Lite a backup console for them. Furukawa said for those purchasing their first Switch console, a higher percentage of female consumers purchased the Lite compared to the full-size Switch console and Nintendo would increase production of the Lite for that market.

==== Software sales ====
As of December 2025, total software sales for the Switch reached just over 1.5 billion. According to Nintendo of America's Doug Bowser, the Switch has had an attach rate (games purchased per unit) of over 8 over its first four years. Top sellers for the platform as of September 30, 2025, include:

=== Financial impact ===
Nintendo's business performance, which had been struggling for several years, soared upon the release of the Switch. By May 23, 2017, the success of the Switch's launch raised Nintendo's stock price to its highest levels in seven years, and an increase in price of over 100% from the previous year. However, the price still trailed Nintendo's peak price by about half, back in 2007 when it had just released the Wii. Nintendo's stock was further boosted a few days later to meet its eight-year high following Capcom's announcement of plans to release the popular Monster Hunter XX for the Switch.

In September 2017, Nintendo announced a partnership with Tencent, the leading publisher for mobile games in China, to bring their game Arena of Valor, the international version of their mainland Chinese game Wangzhe Rongyao, to the Switch following its December 2017 release in Western markets on mobile platforms. At the time, the game had an estimated 200 million players, most in China, and analysts anticipated that Nintendo would be releasing the Switch in China by 2019 as part of this deal. As a result, Nintendo's stock price rose overnight on the news by 7%, reaching a nine-year high. Nintendo's stock reached its ten-year high shortly after the October 2017 expansion of Switch production to 2 million units per month and speculation that Nintendo would likely start selling the unit in China sooner than anticipated.

Nintendo's quarterly reports, for the period ending September 30, 2017, showed a profit of $209 million, the first profitable quarter in several years, due to both success of the Switch and its mobile gaming strategy. For similar reasons, its following quarter, ending December 31, 2017, was Nintendo's most profitable quarter since 2009, with year-to-year revenues increasing by 177%.

Nintendo's quarterly profit jumped by 44% in the first fiscal quarter of 2018 and their net profit totaled $274.9 million during April–June 2018 due to new games being released for the Switch, such as Donkey Kong Country: Tropical Freeze. Sales of the Switch and its games helped increase Nintendo's operating profit by 30% during July–September 2018 and helped Nintendo reach its highest quarterly result in 8 years. Nintendo's quarterly profit jumped by 25% in the third fiscal quarter of 2018 due to the popularity of games on the Switch and their October–December profit totaled $956 million, while quarterly sales totaled $5.6 billion, which were up by 26%.

Nintendo's yearly profit jumped by 39% during the April 2018–March 2019 fiscal year, and annual sales rose 14% to $10.7 billion due to "healthy" software sales for the Switch.

== Legal issues ==
In August 2017, Los Angeles-based tablet peripheral manufacturer Gamevice, Inc. filed a lawsuit against Nintendo in the United States District Court for the Central District of California, alleging that the design of the Switch conflicts with its patent on the design for the Wikipad, an Android-based gaming device that also features a tablet with a detachable controller. The lawsuit sought damages on existing Switch sales and banning further sales of the console. The lawsuit was voluntarily dismissed by Gamevice in October 2017.

In March 2018, Gamevice initiated a second patent infringement lawsuit on Nintendo related to a different set of patents. Gamevice also sought action through the United States International Trade Commission related to patent infringement under Section 337 of the Tariff Act of 1930, and was seeking to block imports of the Switch into the United States. The lawsuit would be terminated on October 10, 2019, with no such violations being found. By March 2020, the United States Patent and Trademark Office had reviewed Gamevice's patents and deemed all of its claims to be unpatentable, a ruling in favor of Nintendo. Gamevice stated they would be challenging the Office's decision.

While appealing the Patent Office's determination on its patents, Gamevice initiated a third infringement claim against Nintendo in March 2020 against a newly published patent it had obtained in August based on a game controller that would wrap around a smart phone. Gamevice sought to block imports of the Switch from Japan while the lawsuit was in progress. The lawsuit ended in favor of Nintendo.

A class action lawsuit was filed in the United States District Court for the Western District of Washington in July 2019 concerning a joystick defect in the console's Joy-Con controllers, commonly referred to as "drift". The suit alleges that Nintendo is aware of a defect that causes the controllers to register movements without the joysticks being touched, but does not "disclose the defect and routinely refuses to repair the joysticks without charge". Three days after the filing, an internal Nintendo company memo was leaked by Vice; the memo instructed Nintendo's customer service employees in North America to begin offering repairs for drifting Joy-Con controllers free of charge regardless of warranty status. The lawsuit, however, continued, and following the release of the Nintendo Switch Lite where some on social media reported the Joy-Con drift problem after 20 hours of play, additional complaints related to the Lite were added to the lawsuit. While the court refused to grant Nintendo a dismissal of the case, it did agree to send the case into arbitration as a first step as outlined in the EULA for the Switch in a ruling made in March 2020.

Nintendo successfully obtained an injunction in December 2019 against a distributor of a hack made by Team Xecuter that enabled Switch users to obtain and run copyright-violating copies of Switch games on the console. Afterwards Nintendo filed lawsuits initially against several resellers of Team Xecuter products in 2020, and in one case, settled with the reseller for $2 million. After members of Team Xecuter were arrested and charged with eleven felony counts by the United States Department of Justice in October 2020, Nintendo filed another lawsuit against one of the arrested members, Gary Bowser; he faces two counts of trafficking and one count of copyright infringement.

== Successor ==
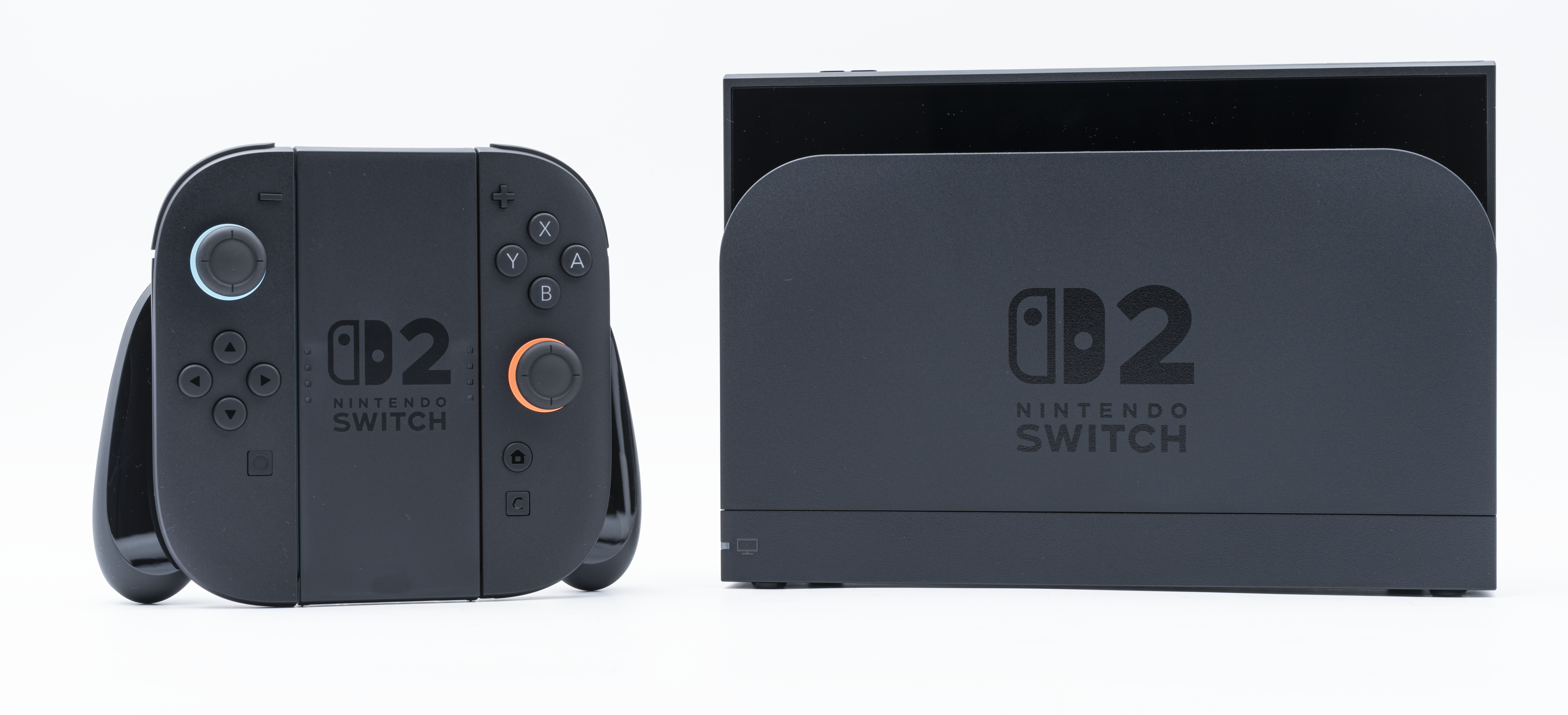
The Nintendo Switch 2 console with docking station

The successor console, Nintendo Switch 2, was formally revealed on January 16, 2025, and released on June 5, 2025. A Nintendo Direct on April 2, 2025, revealed further details, including its release on June 5 later that year. Confirmed changes to the Switch 2 include a larger screen, a redesigned kickstand, and Joy-Con 2 controllers that connects through a plug-like slot rather than through a sliding rail as the original Joy-Con. The Switch 2 has backwards compatibility with most physical and digital Switch games, and will continue to use the Nintendo Switch Online service. "Switch 2 Editions" of some Switch games, such as Breath of the Wild, will be released in an "enhanced" version that will take advantage of the successor hardware. It also uses magnetic-attaching Joy-Con and has a different dock design. Furukawa said during the company's quarterly earnings report in February 2025 that Nintendo plans to continue to support the original Switch console after the Switch 2's release as long as there is demand.

== See also ==
- Nintendo Switch emulation
- Steam Deck, a similar device released in 2022
