= Nintendo mobile games =

Nintendo logo used since 2016

Nintendo, a Japanese home and handheld video game console manufacturer and game developer, has traditionally focused on games that utilize unique elements of its consoles. However, in the early 2010s, the company saw several successive fiscal quarters where they were running at an operating loss. This financial turmoil prompted a shift in strategy to enter the mobile gaming market with the aid of mobile platform development partner DeNA, using mobile titles as a marketing tool to entice that audience into purchasing Nintendo's dedicated video game hardware.

Several of these titles would enter the top-downloaded games list on the iOS App Store and Google Play stores, earning over US$1 billion in total revenue by 2020.

== History ==
=== Prior to 2015 ===
Leading into the 2010s, Nintendo principally offered its portable console, the Nintendo DS, and its home console, the Wii; along with several internally-developed titles in several major video game franchises, such as Super Mario and The Legend of Zelda, which would release exclusively on their hardware. Driven by novel hardware concepts such as the dual-screen nature of the DS line and the motion Wii Remote, both systems had become Nintendo's best-selling handheld and home consoles by the end of 2009. Entering the new decade, Nintendo resolved to maintain this strategy and the overall "dedicated hardware and software" business model with the successor devices to these consoles, the Nintendo 3DS and Wii U, respectively.

The 2010s saw the growth of mobile gaming with wide adoption of smartphones and tablet computers. By 2012, the mobile gaming market was estimated to be worth US$9 billion, compared to the overall video game industry's net value of US$86.1 billion, and expected to be the largest driver of growth in the video game market over the next several years, according to research firm Newzoo.

As mobile gaming grew, Nintendo was criticized for not taking risks in this area, prompted when the valuation of GungHo Online Entertainment, the publishers of the financially successful Puzzle & Dragons, exceeded that of Nintendo's in June 2013. (Note: Nintendo would later partner with GungHo for the release of Puzzle & Dragons Z + Super Mario Bros. Edition in 2015 for the Nintendo 3DS, which used Mario characters atop the existing Puzzle & Dragons gameplay.) These concerns were also compounded by lower-than-projected sales numbers for the aforementioned Nintendo 3DS and Wii U, which had caused Nintendo's stock price to drop. In an interview with The Wall Street Journal during E3 2013, Nintendo global president Satoru Iwata addressed the allure of developing for the mobile market, saying he had opted to not take Nintendo in that direction, focusing instead on providing compelling games that would drive their hardware sales, retaining their unique approach. Iwata believed that while they could easily obtain short-term gains by addressing the mobile market, "20 years down the line, we may look back at the decision not to supply Nintendo games to smartphones and think that is the reason why the company is still here." Previously, Iwata had also asserted that "Nintendo would cease to be Nintendo" if they started development for mobile games. These sentiments were later echoed by Nintendo of America president Reggie Fils-Aimé saying "When the consumer wants to play Mario, Zelda, and Pokémon, they have to purchase our hardware to do so. And that preserves our overall financial model."

In January 2014, when issuing a lowering of its financial forecast for the fiscal year due to continued underperformance, Iwata expressed a more open attitude towards the mobile market, saying "Given the expansion of smart devices, we are naturally studying how smart devices can be used to grow the game-player business," but that "It's not as simple as enabling Mario to move on a smartphone." Later that year, Iwata went further by stating "... I believe that the era has ended when people play all kinds of games only on dedicated gaming systems."

This coincided with The Pokémon Company, a joint venture company created to manage the Pokémon brand separately from Nintendo's other intellectual property, beginning work with third-party developers to create games for smartphones and tablets, initially with Pokémon TCG Online released in September 2014.

=== 2015–2020 ===
Following the end of the 2014 fiscal year, Iwata, Tatsumi Kimishima, Genyo Takeda, and Shigeru Miyamoto crafted a new strategy for Nintendo to bring them back into profitability, which included approaching the mobile market, creating new hardware, and "maximizing [their] intellectual property"

For the mobile gaming area, Iwata initiated discussions with DeNA, a large Japanese mobile platform developer and provider. In March 2015, Nintendo and DeNA announced a partnership to jointly develop at least five mobile game titles, with one title planned to be released by the end of that year. Part of this deal including Nintendo acquiring 10% of DeNA's stock, while DeNA obtained about 1.24% of Nintendo's. When elaborating on the partnership, Iwata said that Nintendo had found a way with DeNA to bring its franchises to mobile devices that took advantage of unique control methods offered by these devices, and stated their belief that their mobile effort will "become an opportunity for the great number of people around the world who own smart devices—but do not have interest in dedicated video game hardware—to be interested in Nintendo IP and eventually to become fans of our dedicated game systems." To prevent speculation that the company would be ceasing hardware development, Nintendo also announced an upcoming console under the codename "NX" during the conference.

At the time of announcement, Nintendo had not committed to whether their mobile games would be free-to-play or require a single up-front cost, but Iwata did assure that they would stay to payment schemes that parents would be comfortable with for letting their children play. Iwata also said that Nintendo would be able to avoid issues that other mobile developers had, where their success usually rested on one key game; Nintendo instead can take advantage of several of their franchises and develop a range of games.

Iwata died from health complications in July 2015, and Kimishima was named Nintendo's new president. Kimishima continued to have Nintendo follow the mobile approach that Iwata had set forward, considering it a core pillar of Nintendo's strategy. The company's first two mobile titles as part of the DeNA partnership would release in 2016, being Miitomo and Super Mario Run, followed by Fire Emblem Heroes in 2017. In statements to investors made in November 2017, Kimishima acknowledged Nintendo was still adapting to mobile, pointing to missed expectations with Super Mario Run, which utilized an up-front cost as opposed to free-to-play model, stating:

Nintendo has a large stock of valuable IP characters and has developed many games. We cannot, however, simply port our existing games and IP to smart-device applications. A lot of thought is going into what kind of games for smart devices will further our business and how we can continue to foster good relationships with our existing dedicated video game platform business. Among the various ideas, a primary concern is enabling our consumers to play on not only smart devices, but also our dedicated video game systems. We want to build up the smart-device business as a core pillar of Nintendoʼs various businesses, but we have not yet reached that level. Nintendo is not at a stage where we can consider becoming a smart-device platform developer.

Near the end of calendar year 2017, Nintendo was reportedly in talks with additional mobile platform providers including GungHo to expand their mobile game offerings, as well as extending their current DeNA deal, according to The Wall Street Journal.

Upon announcement of the jointly developed and operated title Dragalia Lost in April 2018, Nintendo also announced it had acquired about a 5% stake in Japanese mobile game developer Cygames. Around the same time, Kimishima announced he was stepping down as Nintendo's president, to be replaced by Shuntaro Furukawa. Furukawa stated that he planned to continue Nintendo's drive into mobile games towards being a ¥100 billion (approximately US$1 billion) per year revenue source for the company, and try to create more games that were as successful as Pokémon Go.

=== 2020–present ===
Bloomberg News reported in June 2020 that Nintendo was unlikely to further pursue major efforts on the mobile market. While they still would publish and develop games for it and maintain the current ones already available, they would focus less on the mobile market as the success of the Nintendo Switch console coupled with the existing mobile games allowed the company to sustain itself. Bloomberg attributed this to the impact of the COVID-19 pandemic, which caused players to move away from Nintendo's mobile games to other games and failing to reach the projected revenue targets estimated in 2018; Sensor Tower reported double-digit drops in player counts in games like Super Mario Run and Fire Emblem Heroes, while the company's console titles such as Animal Crossing: New Horizons saw massive sales which helped drive Nintendo's profits to a twelve-year high. At a shareholders' meeting the same month, Furukawa stated that there were no new plans for games in the mobile area, though the business still remains important to the company for different reasons outside of revenue including exposure of the brand of Nintendo, its franchises and the establishment of Nintendo accounts into customers.

In March 2021, Nintendo and Niantic announced a partnership to create other mobile games based in Nintendo IP for AR, similar to Pokémon Go. Niantic's Pikmin Bloom was released at the end of 2021.

Nintendo quietly shuttered Dr. Mario World in 2021 and Dragalia Lost in 2022, as well as ended support for Miitomo. An Axios report suggested that these were motivated by the low contribution of these titles to Nintendo's financials, as the company had reported over $4.5 billion in revenue from sales of the Switch and its games between April and September 2022, but only $169 million from its mobile games. In 2023, Miyamoto announced that future Mario games would not be mobile, citing that Nintendo's focus is on its hardware and play experiences that integrate with that hardware. Animal Crossing: Pocket Camp would end service in 2024, being replaced with a paid offline version with no microtransactions.

In February 2025, Furukawa would reaffirm Nintendo's commitment to mobile games during an investor Q&A session, stating that the company was "continuing to develop new game applications" and that mobile content remains an important element in generating interest for their core business alongside other initiatives such as theme parks and feature films. Later that year, the company would release Hey, Mario!, an app geared towards young children for both mobile device and Nintendo consoles, and Fire Emblem Shadows, a social deduction game and the second mobile spin-off in the Fire Emblem series.

== Games ==
Nintendo has developed several mobile games through both internal development studios such as Nintendo Entertainment Planning & Development (EPD), as well as closely affiliated studios such as Intelligent Systems, with most of these titles being in partnership with DeNA.

The games here do not include the Pokémon mobile games which have no involvement from Nintendo and are published and licensed by The Pokémon Company, which are listed separately at list of Pokémon video games.

=== Super Mario Run (2016) ===
Super Mario Run was first released in December 2016 for iOS, and in March 2017 for Android. The game is a type of auto runner, where the player guides Mario and other characters through a course to collect coins, only requiring the player to control the timing and length of Mario's jump. Unlike most mobile games, Nintendo released Super Mario Run as a single-purchase title for US$10, though offering a free limited demo to allow players to try the game. Nintendo had planned on profiting on the sale of conversions from the demo into the full game. While the game was downloaded more than 200 million times, topping app store charts, Nintendo affirmed that they had not reached a 10% target conversion rate worldwide, but were still exploring this approach for future titles. Analytics firm Sensor Tower estimated that Super Mario Run had about $56 million in revenue in its first year.

=== Fire Emblem Heroes (2017) ===
Fire Emblem Heroes was first released in February 2017, developed primarily by Intelligent Systems. It uses the same tactical role-playing game elements from the Fire Emblem series, in which players control a party of heroes to battle foes. Unlike Super Mario Run, Fire Emblem Heroes used a more traditional free-to-play model; players could play as many missions as they could while their party still had stamina, which otherwise refreshes by waiting some amount of time or by using in-game purchases to restore stamina and heal the party. In-app purchases could also be used to purchase new heroes for the player's party. While the game was only downloaded 10 million times by April 2017, it had made US$100 million, about 10 times more reported for Super Mario Run. Within its first year, it had brought in nearly US$300 million in revenue according to Sensor Tower.

=== Pikmin Bloom (2021) ===
In March 2021, Nintendo and Niantic announced a partnership with games developed and published by Niantic for mobile, with the Pikmin franchise being the first one to be released in 2021.

=== Animal Crossing: Pocket Camp Complete (2024) ===
On August 21, 2024, it was announced that Animal Crossing: Pocket Camp will reach end of service on November 29 and be replaced with a paid version without microtransactions called: Animal Crossing: Pocket Camp Complete.

=== Fire Emblem Shadows (2025) ===
In September 2025, Nintendo released a second mobile game in the Fire Emblem series featuring real-time strategy and social deduction multiplayer gameplay.

=== Pictonico! (2026) ===
Co-developed by Nintendo EPD with Intelligent Systems, Pictonico! is a mobile video game where players can take pictures using their camera or use their pictures on their phone and turn them into WarioWare-style minigames.

=== Miitomo (2016) ===
Miitomo was the first mobile app developed through the Nintendo/DeNA partnership, released in March 2016. It was a social networking game, having players interact with their virtual Mii avatars and those of others through the My Nintendo service. The game used a freemium structure, allowing players to use real-world money to purchase in-game currency (which could also be earned through other in-game actions) that can be then used to buy customization options for the player's Mii within the game. Miitomo attracted more than 10 million downloads within a month of its release, though interest waned in the following months. Nintendo ended support for the app in May 2018.

=== Animal Crossing: Pocket Camp (2017) ===
Animal Crossing: Pocket Camp was released in October 2017. Based on the Animal Crossing series, the game is a social simulation game that has the player work to earn a living and improve their home in a town filled with anthropomorphic creatures. Like Fire Emblem Heroes, Nintendo used a free-to-play mechanism, allowing players to purchase in-game items that reduce activity cooldown timers. The title was downloaded more than 15 million times within its first week of release. Sensor Tower estimated the game exceeded US$50 million in revenue within about 10 months from its release. On November 29, 2024 the game has been replaced with a paid version without microtransactions called: Animal Crossing: Pocket Camp Complete.

=== Dragalia Lost (2018) ===
Dragalia Lost was an action role-playing game developed by Cygames. It was announced in April 2018, and launched in Japan, Taiwan, and the United States on September 27, 2018. By July 2019, The game generated over US$100 million in revenue. Dragalia Lost was shut down on November 30, 2022.

=== Dr. Mario World (2019) ===
In January 2019, Nintendo announced Dr. Mario World, a part of the Dr. Mario series, would release for iOS and Android devices, co-developed by Nintendo EPD, Line Corporation, and NHN Entertainment. The game was initially released on July 9, 2019, in 59 territories, and follows the approach set by Candy Crush Saga. As with Dr. Mario, players attempts to clear colored viruses on a stage by matching 2-colored capsules in a match-3 style game. Rather than an open-ended game, Dr. Mario World follows the approach for mobile games set by Candy Crush Saga, with each level designed with a fixed number and location of viruses and blocks, and the player required to complete the level with a limited number of capsules. Monetization is also similar to Candy Crush Saga - the player earns coins in-game and can spend real-world money on diamonds, both which then can be used to purchase special power-ups, or new doctor characters such as Dr. Peach, Dr. Yoshi, and Dr. Toad each with their own unique skill. On July 28, 2021, Nintendo announced that they would be ending service for the game starting on October 31, 2021.

=== Mario Kart Tour (2019) ===
In January 2018, Nintendo announced a mobile version of the Mario Kart series, Mario Kart Tour, for iOS and Android devices. Nintendo announced in April 2019 that they would be holding a closed beta for the game, exclusively for Android users, which took place from late May to early June. Initially expected to be released by March 2019, the game was released on September 25, 2019. The game was downloaded more than 10 million times on its first day, beating the previous first-day record holder Pokémon Go which had 6.7 million, according to Apptopia.

== Other mobile apps ==
=== Nintendo Switch Parental Controls (2017) ===
The Nintendo Switch Parental Controls is a companion mobile app to the Nintendo Switch. Although the console itself includes standard parental control settings, the app introduces additional features such as monitoring game play activities of child users, setting daily time limits, and a manual software suspension function. Standard parental control settings can also be configured via this app. This is made possible via child accounts registered on a parent's own Nintendo Account. The app was launched alongside the Nintendo Switch in March 2017.

=== Nintendo Switch App (2017) ===
While the Nintendo Switch has various online and networking functionalities, Nintendo elected to use a separate mobile app, Nintendo Switch Online, for features such as in-game voice chat, adding friends, and managing of the Switch Online subscription service to access more advanced features. According to Fils-Aimé, they wanted to use a mobile app for these features so that players could take advantage of their existing mobile devices that are already geared for aspects like voice chat, and to eliminate some of the latency problems that players may encounter if they were playing the Switch in its handheld mode. The app was released in July 2017 in some countries. The app was soft-launched in July 2017, alongside the release of Splatoon 2. A full version of the app was released in September 2018.

In 2025, the app was rebranded to Nintendo Switch App, and allowed for non-membership focused features such as an in-depth friends list and viewing screenshots taken on the user's Nintendo Switch 2.

=== WeChat (2019) ===
Although the Nintendo Switch officially launched in mainland China in December 2019 in partnership with Tencent, Switch units officially distributed in mainland China lack support for the Nintendo Account log in system, which is required to use the Nintendo Switch's Parental Controls and Switch Online mobile apps as available in other markets. However, Tencent replaced Nintendo's online services with their own WeChat log in system integrated into the Chinese Nintendo Switch system software. Consequently, Tencent embedded additional widgets, or "mini programs", to their WeChat mobile app to give Chinese Nintendo Switch users an alternative method for support functionality such as remote parental controls and eShop pay support, as well as game-specific functions, such as the ability to track play statistics for Ring Fit Adventure.

=== Nintendo Store (2020) ===
In October 2020, Nintendo released a mobile app called My Nintendo exclusively in Japan. The app allowed users to see news on Nintendo products, browse the My Nintendo Store, see upcoming events and watch Nintendo Directs live, in addition to seeing playtime for Nintendo Switch, Wii U and Nintendo 3DS software.

In November 2025 the app was overhauled and retitled Nintendo Store. The app was redesigned to remove some features, and made the app available internationally.

=== Nintendo Music (2024) ===
Released in October 2024, the Nintendo Music app allows users to stream or download Nintendo soundtracks, create and share playlists, and also has the ability to extend songs up to 60 minutes.

=== Nintendo Today! (2025) ===
Released in March 2025, the Nintendo Today! app delivers Nintendo news and updates to users daily, including news about Nintendo Switch 2, game information and events. Users can personalise the app with themes and choose to show and hide news about specific Nintendo franchises. The app also supports home screen widgets.

=== Hello, Mario! (2025) ===
Nintendo released a smart device app aimed for young children as part of the My Mario line, entitled Hello, Mario!, where players can interact with a 2D Mario's face, in a similar fashion to Super Mario 64's title screen. They can manipulate Mario's face, and summon a number of power-ups and enemies to affect the screen and make things happen to Mario. The app initially launched in Japan on August 26, 2025, and later launched in most regions on February 19, 2026. The app is also available for Nintendo Switch. A sister app entitled Hello, Yoshi! was launched in Japan in November 2025.

== Commercial impact ==
Following the release of Pokémon Go, Nintendo's value rose by over US$17 billion, emphasizing the importance of the mobile gaming sector to the company. The company reported that about ¥20 billion of its revenue in the 2016 fiscal year came from mobile games, while in the first six months of the 2017 fiscal year, about ¥17.6 billion in revenue was reported. While these numbers did not quite meet expected revenues, Nintendo has asserted it still remains strong on the mobile strategy as to help lead mobile players into purchasing their consoles and games. By the end of March 2018, their mobile games had brought in more than ¥39.3 billion, an increase of 172% from 2017. Kimishima said of these 2017 fiscal year numbers that "we have not reached a satisfactory profit point yet, so our goal is to further expand the scale of this business to develop it into one of the pillars of revenue".

In 2017, Rob Fahey of GamesIndustry.biz stated that the commercial success of Nintendo's mobile games were not as great as they could be, believing that while Fire Emblem Heroes had made the transition to mobile well, Nintendo was still struggling with how to take its IP into a mobile format that would entice people to play. He noted that while Super Mario Run's approach to monetization was counter to most mobile titles, Animal Crossing: Pocket Camp was more of a standard free-to-play game, but lacked significant attention since its gameplay format was atypical for mobile devices.

By August 2023, Appmagic estimated that the total revenue from all of Nintendo's mobile games had reached US$1.5 billion, with the most having come from Fire Emblem Heroes with US$810 million.
