= Makiko Ohmoto =

Japanese voice actress, narrator, and singer (born 1973)

- 大本 眞基子
- Born: February 1, 1973 (age 53); Kurashiki, Okayama Prefecture, Japan
- Other names: Makkī (マッキー); Ōmotchan (おおもっちゃん); Ōmoto-kun (おーもとくん)
- Occupations: Voice actress; narrator; singer
- Years active: 1994–present
- Known for: Voice of Kirby in the Kirby franchise
- Notable work: Kirby in Kirby of the Stars; Inahime in Samurai Warriors; Lyn in Fire Emblem; Ness in Super Smash Bros.
- Website: ameblo.jp/makiko-ohmoto/

Makiko Ohmoto (大本 眞基子, Ōmoto Makiko; born February 1, 1973) is a freelance Japanese voice actress from Okayama Prefecture.

She is best known for her roles as the titular character Kirby in the Kirby video game series, Inahime in the Samurai Warriors series, Yui Kasuga in Corrector Yui, Micchi Hatogaya in Crayon Shin-chan, Lyn in the Fire Emblem series, Fiona Elisi Linette in Zoids: Chaotic Century, Makino in One Piece, Matatabi in Cyborg Kuro-chan, Sayaka Maizono in the Danganronpa series, Nero Stella Boruzoi in Bakusō Kyōdai Let's & Go!! MAX, Viridi in Kid Icarus: Uprising, and Ness from the EarthBound series in the Super Smash Bros. series.

== Biography ==
Ohmoto was born on February 1, 1973 in Kurashiki, Okayama Prefecture, Japan.

Having loved expressing the inexpressible since her childhood, she spent her spare moments drawing. However, upon discovering the profession of voice acting during her second year of junior high school, something clicked. She was drawn to the field because voice work transcends the boundaries of age and gender, allowing for a vast range of expressions. At times, it offers an even greater variety of simulated experiences than on-camera acting, pushing the boundaries of psychological expression. Sensing this immense potential, Ohmoto decided to pursue a career as a voice actress.

After graduating from Shujitsu High School, she entered Saga Art College, formerly known as Saga Art Junior College, and upon graduating, she moved to Tokyo in order to pursue a voice acting career. She enrolled at Aoni Juku and after finishing, joined Aoni Production, where she was affiliated with until departing in 2008. She made her voice acting debut in Street Fighter II: The Animated Movie as the Voice on Phone and landed her first regular television anime role in Cutie Honey Flash as Aki Natsuko.

In 1999, she debuted in the role of Kirby in the Nintendo 64 video game Super Smash Bros..

Starting in 2004, she ran her own website "HORSE & HATOOK!!" until her computer broke down on July 24, 2008, causing her to lose her Homepage Builder software, which caused the site to cease updating. She launched a blog titled "Horse & Hatook ∞ -Mugendai-" in September of 2008. In 2009, she published a picture book entitled "Boku no Tabi".

In late 2017, she was appointed as the Goodwill Ambassador for Yashio City, Saitama Prefecture. In February of the following year, Ohmoto joined Atomic Monkey.

On March 15, 2020, Ohmoto had her appendix removed. Sometime in that same year, she started enrolling at Kokugakuin University.

On June 1, 2022, it was announced that Ohmoto had left Atomic Monkey as of May 31 of that year and started working as a freelancer.

== Personal life ==
Her personal hobbies are drawing, visiting art museums, meditating, and singing, and her special talents are calligraphy (8th-degree black belt level) and reciting the Heart Sutra from memory.

Her personal favorite materials include the "Sherlock Holmes" series, Ryotaro Shiba's novel "Kunitori Monogatari", the literary of Chūya Nakahara, Shuntaro Tanikawa, and Kenji Miyazawa, and the music of ZABADAK and Fumio Miyashita. Her favorite colors are pink, greenish-brown (uguisu-iro), and plain blue. She dislikes prejudice and preconceptions.

Ohmoto listed Kōtarō Satomi, Tetsurō Tamba, Jeremy Brett, Robin Williams, Tom Hanks, and Haley Joel Osment as some of her favorite actors.

She can produce a voice with the "1/f fluctuation" wavelength, a soothing acoustic trait famously shared by legendary singers such as Misia, Hibari Misora, and Hikaru Utada, as well as actor and narrator Leo Morimoto.

=== Episodes ===
Kirby, the main character of the video game series and its anime adaptation Kirby of the Stars, has been voiced by Ohmoto across all versions worldwide, including international releases. She shares a close relationship with Masahiro Sakurai, the creator of the Kirby franchise and a fellow game designer, as she is occasionally invited to attend events hosted by him.

Ohmoto has cited Kirby as the highest pitch role she has voiced and Matatabi from Cyborg Kuro-chan as the deepest pitch role she has voiced.

In the television anime Kirby of the Stars, Kirby is portrayed as a character who barely speaks, a decision based on the idea of "not imposing a fixed image on Kirby, whose appearance varies depending on the player." However, while recording the final episode, during in a scene where Kirby is chasing after Fūmu after she had been snatched by Nightmare, Ohmoto ad-libbed Kirby shouting, "Fūmu!" This ad-lib was cut because "calling out her name would have given it too much significance in terms of the direction".

Matatabi from Cyborg Kuro-chan was a role she had difficulty voicing, as she performed while receiving guidance from the show's audio director Noriyoshi Matsuura, who told her she "had potential for a deeper voice".

When voicing Queen Sectonia in Kirby: Triple Deluxe, Ohmoto focused on portraying her as "noble and sublime, yet filled with a touch of madness and melancholy".

== Filmography ==
=== Television animation ===
List of voice performances in television animation
Year	Title	Role	Notes	Source
1994	Tsuyoshi Shikkari Shinasai	Hostess		
1994	Sailor Moon S	Girl, Child, Daimon 1	Girl in Ep. 115, Child in Ep. 116, Daimon 1 in Ep. 124	
1995	Shima Shima Tora no Shimajirō	Joey, Child B, TV Can, Calf, Flower		
1995	Sailor Moon SuperS	Ame-tama	Ep. 158	
1996	Kiteretsu Daihyakka	Woman	Ep. 317	
1996	Sailor Moon Sailor Stars	Lily, Manager, Host, Airport Announcer	Lily in Ep. 171, Manager in Ep. 174, Host in Ep. 178, Airport Announcer in Ep. 188	
1996	Let's Go! Anpanman	Candied Apple Girl, Red Rice-Cake Pounder, Komanosuke, Prince Spice, Ginkgo Nut Boy A	Second voice of Red Rice-Cake Pounder, Komanosuke, and Prince Spice	
1996	Bakusō Kyōdai Let's & Go!!	Child A, Borzoi Racer		
1996	Jigoku Sensei Nūbē	Yoshie Satō, Housewife, Boy, Akane Ōtaki	Housewife in Ep. 3, Boy in Ep. 20, Akane Ōtaki in Ep. 22	
1997	Cutie Honey Flash	Aki Natsuko		
1997	You're Under Arrest	Kazuyo Kawada	Ep. 18	
1998	Lost Universe	Assistant Nurse, Rob, Policewoman	Assistant Nurse in Ep. 6, Rob in Ep. 10, Policewoman in Ep. 17	
1998	Bakusō Kyōdai Let's & Go!! MAX	Nero Stella Boruzoi		
1998	Nightwalker: The Midnight Detective	Mikako	Debuts Ep. 5	
1999	Hakugei: Legend of the Moby Dick	Atre	Second voice, Eps 20-26	
1999	Gokudō the Adventurer	Ikkyū		
1999	Corrector Yui	Yui Kasuga		
1999	Super Yo-Yo	Mai Kirisaki, Boy		
1999	One Piece	Makino, Tamanegi, Miss Monday		
1999	Zoids: Chaotic Century	Fiona Elisi Linette, Sieg	Sieg in Ep. 1 only	
2000	Cyborg Kuro-chan	Matatabi	Main role, debuts Ep. 15	
2001	Crayon Shin-chan	Micchi Hatogaya, Yuu Yakutsukuri	Second voice of Micchi Hatogaya	
2001	Project ARMS	Jeff Bowen, Maya Tomoe	Jeff Bowen in Eps 3-7, Maya Tomoe in Eps 3 and 26	
2001	Kirby of the Stars	Kirby, Rick, Hohhe		
2001	Captain Tsubasa: Road to 2002	Yoshiko Fujisawa		
2001	Crush Gear Turbo	Kishin Ōkawa		
2001	s-CRY-ed	Shoka, Fani Terakado	Shoka in Eps 9, 13-14, 16-17, and 19, Fani Terakado in Ep. 15	
2002	Cheeky Angel	Miki Hanakain		
2002	Kikō Sennyo Rouran	Mahoro Mikogami		
2002	Atashin'chi	Rio		
2002	Digimon Frontier	ToyAgumon		
2003	Mermaid's Forest	Masato		
2003	Great Detective Conan	Rumiko Yoshii, Maiko Kuzumi, Child, Reporter, Woman	Rumiko Yoshii in Eps 348-349, Maiko Kuzumi in Eps 513-514	
2004	Doraemon	Fumi Shimada	Ep. 1740	
2004	Midori Days	Makie		
2004	Battle B-Daman	Mirumasu		
2004	Black Jack	Mika		
2005	Battle B-Daman: Fire Spirits	Gunnos		
2005	Onmyou Taisenki	Shōsetsu no Tankamui, Utsuho		
2005	Gun Sword	Carossa		
2005	Bobobo-bo Bo-bobo	LOVE		
2006	Yomigaeru Sora – Rescue Wings	Yumi, Student volunteer	Student volunteer in Ep. 4	
2006	Angel Heart	Joy Rō		
2006	Demashita! Powerpuff Girls Z	Ken Kitazawa		
2006	Kenichi: The Mightiest Disciple	Izumi Yuka		
2007	Code Geass: Lelouch of the Rebellion	SP	Ep. 21	
2007	Gegege no Kitarō	Satoshi, Rina, Yusuke, Kenta, Kōhei, Yobuko	Satoshi in Ep. 16, Rina in Ep. 37, Yusuke in Ep. 48, Kenta in Ep. 61, Kōhei in Ep. 65, Yobuko in Ep. 92	
2007	The Wallflower	Ikeda		
2009	Doraemon	Eiko, Young Nobirou, Young Nobisuke Nobi, Yasuo		
2009	Battle Spirits: Shōnen Toppa Bashin	Baito-san		
2009	Inuyasha: The Final Act	Bone Demon		
2012	One Piece: Episode of Luffy – Adventure on Hand Island	Makino	Television special	
2013	Hunter × Hunter	Female Writer, Ortho's Sister	Female Writer in Ep. 96, Ortho's Sister in Ep. 101	
2013	Danganronpa: The Animation	Sayaka Maizono		
2014	Samurai Warriors Special: Legend of the Sanada	Inahime	Television special	
2015	Samurai Warriors	Inahime		
2016	Danganronpa 3: The End of Hope's Peak High School	Sayaka Maizono		
2017	One Piece: Episode of East Blue: Luffy and His Four Friends' Great Adventure	Makino, Onion	Television special	
2018	Conception	Ruka, Cancer		
2020	Zoids Wild Zero	Gene Elisia Linette		
2025	Puniru Is a Cute Slime	Ice Pudding	Ep. 17	
2025	Style of Hiroshi Nohara's Lunch	Micchi Hatogaya	Ep. 9	

Unknown date

- Kochira Katsushika-ku Kameari Kōen-mae Hashutsujo

=== Theatrical animation ===
List of voice performances in theatrical animation
Year	Title	Role	Notes	Source
1994	Street Fighter II: The Movie	Voice on Phone	Voice acting debut role	
1994	Osawaga! Super Baby	Child		
1996	Dragon Quest Saga – The Crest of Roto	Kira's Minion		
1997	Elmer no Bouken: My Father's Dragon	Lucy		
1997	Cutie Honey Flash	Aki Natsuko		
2000	A Grandmother's Recollections	Young Nobita Nobi	Short film	
2000	The Laws of the Sun: One Source, One Planet, One People	Sena, Yana, Monju Disciple, Maid, Sally		
2004	Doraemon: Nobita in the Wan-Nyan Spacetime Odyssey	Young Nobita Nobi		
2005	One Piece: Baron Omatsuri and the Secret Island	Rosa		
2006	Crayon Shin-chan: The Legend Called: Dance! Amigo!	Micchi Hatogaya		
2007	Detective Conan: Jolly Roger in the Deep Azure	Chinatsu Mabuchi		
2009	The Rebirth of Buddha	Rina		
2010	Detective Conan: The Lost Ship in the Sky	Female Announcer		
2013	Lupin the 3rd vs. Detective Conan: The Movie	Staff B		
2019	King of Prism: Shiny Seven Stars	Young Jōji Takadanobaba		
2022	One Piece Film: Red	Makino		

=== Original video animation (OVA) ===
List of voice performances in original video animation
Year	Title	Role	Notes	Source
1995	Giant Robo: Gin Rei With Blue Eyes	Child B		
1995	Armitage III	Secretary	Ep. 2	
1996	Voltage Fighter Gowcaizer	Kubira		
1998	Spectral Force	Little Snow		
2001	Puni Puni Poemy	Mitsuki Aasu		
2004	Interlude	Aya's mother	Ep. 2	
2013	Kenichi: The Mightiest Disciple	Izumi Yuka		

=== Original net animation (ONA) ===
List of voice performances in original net animation
Year	Title	Role	Notes	Source
2006	Bakumatsu Kikansetsu Irohanihoheto	Sonosuke Gotō		

=== Video games ===
List of voice performances in video games
Year	Title	Role	Notes	Source
1996	Purikura Daisakusen	Grey O'Brien		
1997	Shining Force III	Grace		
1999	Super Smash Bros.	Kirby, Ness	First vocal performance as Kirby	
2000	Kirby 64: The Crystal Shards	Kirby		
2001	Super Smash Bros. Melee	Kirby, Ness		
2002	Kirby: Nightmare in Dream Land	Kirby		
2002	Kaettekita Cyborg Kuro-Chan	Matatabi		
2003	Summon Night 3	Subaro		
2003	Everybody's Golf 4	Aimi, Kazuma		
2004	Airforce Delta Strike	Ruth Valentine		
2004	Samurai Warriors	Inahime	Character exclusive to Samurai Warriors: Xtreme Legends	
2005	WarTech: Senko no Ronde	Sakurako Sanjo		
2006	Samurai Warriors 2	Inahime		
2007	One Piece: Unlimited Adventure	Tamanegi		
2007	Super Smash Bros. Brawl	Kirby, Ness, Lyn		
2008	Warriors Orochi 2	Inahime		
2008	Tales of Vesperia	Witchell		
2009	Samurai Warriors 3	Inahime		
2010	Kirby's Epic Yarn	Kirby		
2010	Danganronpa: Trigger Happy Havoc	Sayaka Maizono		
2011	Kirby's Return to Dream Land	Kirby		
2011	Warriors Orochi 3	Inahime		
2012	Kid Icarus: Uprising	Viridi		
2012	Conception	Ruka		
2014	Kirby: Triple Deluxe	Kirby, Queen Sectonia		
2014	Samurai Warriors 4	Inahime		
2014	CV: Casting Voice	Kana Sizuki		
2014	Super Smash Bros. for Nintendo 3DS and Wii U	Kirby, Ness, Lyn, Viridi		
2015	Kirby and the Rainbow Curse	Kirby		
2016	Kirby: Planet Robobot	Kirby, Susie		
2016	Samurai Warriors: Spirit of Sanada	Inahime		
2017	Danganronpa V3: Killing Harmony	Sayaka Maizono		
2017	Fire Emblem Heroes	Lyn, Bramimond, Nephenee		
2017	Fire Emblem Warriors	Lyn		
2018	Kirby: Star Allies	Kirby		
2018	Warriors Orochi 4	Inahime		
2018	Super Smash Bros. Ultimate	Kirby, Ness, Mii Fighters, Lyn, Viridi	Provides "voice 6" for the Mii Fighters	
2019	Super Robot Wars T	Carossa		
2021	Super Robot Wars 30	Carossa		
2022	Kirby and the Forgotten Land	Kirby		
2022	Kirby's Dream Buffet	Kirby		
2023	Fire Emblem Engage	Lyn		
2025	Fire Emblem Shadows	Lyn		
2025	Kirby Air Riders	Female Announcer & Narrator		
2027	Kirby and the World Beyond	Kirby		

=== Dubbing roles ===
==== Feature films ====
List of dubbing performances in feature films
Title	Role	Notes	Source
2 Days in the Valley	Susan Parish (Glenne Headly)		
