= Lyn (Fire Emblem) =

Fire Emblem protagonist

- Fire Emblem character
- Lyn in Fire Emblem: The Blazing Blade
- First game: Fire Emblem: The Blazing Blade (2003)
- Designed by: Sachiko Wada
- Voiced by: Makiko Ōmoto (Japanese); Wendee Lee (English); Lani Minella (English, Super Smash Bros. series)

Lyndis, commonly known as Lyn, is one of the protagonists in the 2003 video game Fire Emblem: The Blazing Blade, released as Fire Emblem outside of Japan. She is a nomad who discovers she has a noble lineage, aiding fellow protagonists Eliwood and Hector to defeat the antagonist, Nergal. She makes appearances in other entries, including Fire Emblem Engage and Fire Emblem Heroes, the latter in which she was voted the favorite female character in the Fire Emblem series. She was originally designed by Sachiko Wada, and is voiced by Makiko Ōmoto in Japanese and Wendee Lee in English.

Lyn has been generally well received, identified as a popular character in the series. Her popularity was noted as surprising by Fire Emblem Heroes co-director Kouhei Maeda, who stated that she was particularly popular in North America.

== Appearances ==
Lyn originally appears in Fire Emblem: The Blazing Blade in 2003, released outside of Japan as Fire Emblem, the protagonist alongside Eliwood and Hector. Believed to be the last of the Lorca tribe and the wielder of the Mani Katti, Lyn lives on the plain until she is summoned by the Lord of Caelin. Accompanied by multiple allies, including her friend Florina, she saves him from being killed by poison and learns that she is a princess of Caelin and his granddaughter. In Eliwood's chapters, Lyn, Florina, and her other allies eventually reunite with Eliwood and Hector. Lyn aids them in their journey of defeating the antagonist Nergal, receiving the Sol Katti as her ultimate weapon. After completing the story, Lyn may have a paired ending with certain characters, including Eliwood, Hector, and Florina. In the case of the former two, she will give birth to Roy or Lilina from Fire Emblem: The Binding Blade respectively, who go on to serve as the male and female lead of that game. She later appears as a downloadable character in Fire Emblem: Awakening. In the video game Fire Emblem Engage, Lyn appears as a type of character called "Emblem" that is capable of enhancing the regular characters. In this game, she is able to use a bow.

Lyn appears as a playable character in the mobile game Fire Emblem Heroes. She has received more than five variant designs. A vote to add variants of male and female characters to Heroes was held in 2017, with Lyn receiving the most votes of all female characters. Heroes later introduced a subscription service to the game, which included a feature that turned regular Lyn characters into a "Resplendent" version, among others. A duo character was later added featuring Lyn and Florina in November 2020. This duo, along with other characters as part of the event, is themed after ninja. In the video game Fire Emblem Warriors, Lyn appears as an unlockable playable character. In the mobile game Fire Emblem Shadows, Lyn is a playable character, featured as part of a premium battle pass. She can also be obtained by unlocking her. In the Super Smash Bros. series, Lyn appears as part of an item called an "Assist Trophy", an item that summons a character that can aid the summoner in battle. She first appeared as one in Super Smash Bros. Brawl.

Lyn received a 1/7 scale figure from Good Smile, which was produced with supervision by series developer Intelligent Systems. The figure was based on an illustration by Blazing Blade artist Sachiko Wada, who designed her to be dancing lightly to the wind blowing by with windswept hair and a "lively expression". She wears a red obi.

== Concept and creation ==
Lyn was designed by series artist Sachiko Wada. She has long dark green hair put in a ponytail, and wears a blue outfit with gold trim that has a long slit on either side. According to Blazing Blade producer Tohru Narihiro, the game was initially going to have three difficulty levels. This changed when they decided that easy, normal, and hard would be represented by Lyn, Eliwood, and Hector, respectively. Lyn is voiced by Makiko Ōmoto in Japanese and Wendee Lee and Lani Minella (the latter in Super Smash Bros.) in English.

== Reception ==
Lyn has been generally well received, considered a fan favorite in the Fire Emblem series and the most popular female character in the series. According to Nintendo World Report writer Donald Theriault, she is also the most popular character from Blazing Blade. Twinfinite writer Chris Jecks stated that she was the first Fire Emblem protagonist players met, which he believed made her a fan favorite. In particular, he believed that her relationship with Hector was loved by fans. In their podcast, Nintendo World Report staff criticized Lyn as a bland character, believing her to be only slightly less bland than Eliwood. They stated that she lacked any significance to the main plot, as well as the fact that she did not get a special weapon like Eliwood and Hector did. One writer believed that her lack of significance was due to her not being in The Binding Blade like Eliwood and Hector were. They felt that her being the first character many met in the series and being attractive were major parts of what made her popular, but stated that she was not the most interesting character in Blazing Blade, and less interesting than later protagonists. Discussing her ending, another writer was frustrated by Lyn and Florina's ending; he considered it the best ending, but bemoaned that they were described as just being friends. When commenting on her popularity in Fire Emblem Heroes polls, co-director Kouhei Maeda noted how surprising her popularity was, noting that she was particularly popular outside of Japan. The Mary Sue writer Princess Weekes regarded Lyn as one of her favorite female characters, having enjoyed building a bond with her in the beginning of Blazing Blade and being disappointed by switching to Eliwood and Hector's story due to finding them less cool than Lyn. She also praised her design, particularly her long green hair and outfit.

Digitally Downloaded writer Matt Sainsbury considered Lyn his favorite hero in the series, stating that she had caused him to become hooked on the series. He considered her a "truly special character, attributing her popularity to being the first character many met in the series, as well as her being a female protagonist who was "resourceful, empowered, and important". Sainsbury believed her ahead of her time as a strong female character, that she differed from common female character archetypes, including damsels in distress and sexualized characters, and was the first female protagonist he could remember that being true of. Sainsbury also praised her for being attractive without being sexualized. Despite his praise, he bemoaned that her quest to save her grandfather was a "glorified tutorial". He was disappointed to switch to Eliwood and Hector's story, stating that while they were good, it felt like a step back for it to switch to a "standard story of dudes saving the world". Sainsbury believed that Nintendo did not recognize her significance, believing that she would not be included in Fire Emblem Warriors in a significant capacity.

IGN writer Lucas M. Thomas stated that Lyn was among the most requested characters from the Fire Emblem series for inclusion as a playable character in Super Smash Bros. He believed that she would work as a contrast to certain other Fire Emblem characters in the series due to being a less bulky character with a fast-paced fighting style. Thomas considered her a valuable inclusion for more feminine representation of the Fire Emblem series in Smash. USgamer writer Kat Bailey considered Lyn a favorite character of hers, stating that, despite being a fan favorite, she never made it into the Super Smash Bros. series as a playable character.
