= Nintendo eShop =

Online service for Nintendo Switch and Nintendo Switch 2

- Logo since May 2025
- Developer: Nintendo
- Type: Online distribution
- Launched: Nintendo 3DS; June 6, 2011; 15 years ago; Wii U; November 18, 2012; 14 years ago; Nintendo Switch; March 3, 2017; 9 years ago; CHN: December 10, 2019; 6 years ago; Nintendo Switch 2; June 5, 2025; 17 months ago
- Discontinued: List: Nintendo 3DS, Wii U; July 31, 2020; 6 years ago (Latin America and the Caribbean); March 27, 2023; 3 years ago (International); Nintendo Switch; May 31, 2023; 3 years ago (Russia); March 31, 2026; 7 months ago (China)
- Platforms: Nintendo 3DS; Wii U; Nintendo Switch; Nintendo Switch 2
- Operating systems: Nintendo 3DS system software; Wii U system software; Nintendo Switch system software
- Status: Active (discontinued for 3DS and Wii U versions)
- Website: nintendo.com/store

The Nintendo eShop is a digital distribution service for the Nintendo Switch and the Nintendo Switch 2, and formerly available via the Nintendo Network for the Nintendo 3DS and Wii U. Launched in June 2011 on the Nintendo 3DS, the Nintendo eShop served as the successor to both the Wii Shop Channel and DSi Shop. It is also a multitasking application, which means it is easily accessible even when a game is already running in the background through the system software. The Nintendo eShop features downloadable games, demos, applications, streaming videos, consumer rating feedback, and other information on upcoming game releases. The service was discontinued globally for the Nintendo 3DS and Wii U in March 2023, continuing only on the Switch and Switch 2.

== Key features ==
Logo used from 2012 to 2017

Initially, the two versions of the Nintendo eShop between the Nintendo 3DS and Wii U were independent of each other. Whilst this remains largely true, after the implementation of Nintendo Network ID for the Nintendo 3DS, users that register the same ID account between both systems (currently at one time per console) can share a combined funds balance, home address, saved credit and debit card information, wish list entries, and (formerly) linked Club Nintendo accounts. With the release of the Nintendo Switch version of the Nintendo eShop, the balance stored on a Nintendo Network ID can be shared or transferred to a Nintendo Account to be spent on the Nintendo Switch.

The eShop stores a record of all downloads and purchases, allowing users to re-download previously purchased software at no additional charge, provided the software is still available on the eShop. Downloads can be started immediately, or they can be queued up and be pushed to the console while it is not in use or when the eShop application is not running. Users upgrading from a Nintendo DSi system can transfer their previous DSiware purchases to the Nintendo 3DS, with limited exceptions, such as Flipnote Studio. A December 2011 update enabled a similar feature allowing users to transfer their purchases between 3DS systems. Before the implementation of Nintendo Network ID for the Nintendo 3DS in December 2013, only five transfers between Nintendo 3DS systems were permitted. The limit on system transfers has since been permanently waived.

In 2016, Humble Bundle has sold collections of 3DS and Wii U games in North America with Nintendo of America support. In 2019, Nintendo of America began selling selected first-party games on Humble Bundle's store.

== Region availability ==
Map of all markets where the Nintendo eShop service is officially available as of November 2026.

As of November 10, 2026, the Nintendo eShop is officially available in the following 50 markets worldwide:

- Argentina
- Australia
- Austria
- Belgium
- Brazil
- Bulgaria
- Canada
- Chile
- Colombia
- Croatia
- Cyprus (Note: Including the British overseas territory of Akrotiri and Dhekelia)
- Czech Republic
- Denmark
- Estonia
- Finland (Note: Including the Autonomous Region of Åland)
- France (Note: Including the country of Monaco, the territory of French Southern and Antarctic Lands, the sui generis collectivity of New Caledonia, the overseas collectivities of French Polynesia, Saint Barthélemy, Saint Martin, and Wallis and Futuna, and the overseas departments and regions of French Guiana, Guadeloupe, Martinique, and Mayotte)
- Germany
- Greece
- Hong Kong
- Hungary
- (Republic of Ireland) Ireland
- Israel*
- Italy (Note: Including the countries of San Marino and Vatican City)
- Japan
- Latvia
- Lithuania
- Luxembourg
- Malaysia
- Malta
- Mexico
- Netherlands
- New Zealand
- Norway (Note: Including the territories of Jan Mayen and Svalbard)
- Peru
- Philippines
- Poland
- Portugal (Note: Including the Autonomous Regions of Azores and Madeira)
- Romania
- Singapore
- Slovakia
- Slovenia
- South Africa
- South Korea
- Spain (Note: Including the country of Andorra, the Autonomous Community of Canary Islands, the Autonomous Cities of Ceuta, Melilla and the Plazas de soberanía)
- Sweden
- Switzerland
- Taiwan
- Thailand
- United Kingdom (Note: Including the crown dependencies of Guernsey, Isle of Man and Jersey)
- United States (Note: Including the inhabited territories of American Samoa, Guam, the Northern Mariana Islands, Puerto Rico, and the United States Virgin Islands and the Micronesian countries of the Marshall Islands and Palau)

'*' = The official Nintendo eShop in this market is currently limited to only download code support.

=== Upcoming launch ===
In April 2025, Nintendo originally announced they were preparing the Nintendo eShop and Nintendo Switch Online services to launch in Malaysia, the Philippines, Singapore, and Thailand following the launch of the Nintendo Switch 2 these markets in Q3 2025. Nintendo subsequently announced that the Nintendo eShop and Nintendo Switch Online would become available in Singapore, Malaysia, and Thailand on November 18, 2025, and later in the Philippines on November 10, 2026. In May 2025, Advanced Initiative Company, Nintendo's Saudi Arabian representative since September 2023, announced the Nintendo eShop is confirmed to launch for the Saudi market at some point in the future. In September 2026, Nintendo announced the Nintendo Switch and Nintendo Switch 2 will officially launch in Indonesia on December 10, but pointed out the Nintendo eShop will not be available at launch, whilst indicating that further information will be disclosed later on.

==== TBA ====
- Saudi Arabia
- Indonesia

=== Former markets ===
Certain markets originally had official access to a variation of the Nintendo eShop at one point, but Nintendo had discontinued the service in those markets for various reasons without a present follow-up, or for long periods of time.

Many South American and Caribbean markets (Note: Specifically including Anguilla, Antigua and Barbuda, Aruba, the Bahamas, Barbados, Belize, Bermuda, Bolivia, the Cayman Islands, Costa Rica, Dominica, the Dominican Republic, Ecuador, El Salvador, Grenada, Guatemala, Guyana, Haiti, Honduras, Jamaica, Montserrat, the Netherlands Antilles, Nicaragua, Panama, Paraguay, Saint Kitts and Nevis, Saint Lucia, Saint Vincent and the Grenadines, Suriname, Trinidad and Tobago, the Turks and Caicos Islands, the Virgin Islands (British and American), Uruguay, and Venezuela) originally had access to a limited variant of the Nintendo eShop on both Nintendo 3DS and Wii U, whilst Asian markets such as Saudi Arabia, Singapore, Malaysia, and the United Arab Emirates originally had access to a limited variant of the eShop on Nintendo 3DS only. Many of the markets listed were not followed up with any official access to the eShop on succeeding platforms as of present, even if said platforms were officially available. However, it was confirmed that the Nintendo eShop service would officially re-launch as a full service in Singapore and Malaysia, in addition to Thailand on November 18, 2025, while eventually re-launching in the Philippines on November 10, 2026.

The Taiwanese market has had a complicated history with Nintendo products in the 2010s. The Nintendo 3DS was officially launched in Taiwan, and one time had access to a Chinese variation of the Nintendo eShop which it shared with Hong Kong. Although the Nintendo Switch was eventually officially launched in Taiwan, Hong Kong had gained official access to the eShop on Nintendo Switch since April 3, 2018, whilst Taiwan has not had the service until September 9, 2025, after the Nintendo Switch 2 launched. The Wii U was never officially released in either Hong Kong or Taiwan.

On May 31, 2023, Nintendo was obligated to close the eShop on the Nintendo Switch in Russia after more than a year's hiatus due to reasons beyond their control, likely as a consequence of the Russian invasion of Ukraine.

The Tencent (Note: In China, the Nintendo eShop for Nintendo Switch was an isolated variant supported by Tencent's WeChat SSO instead of Nintendo Account.) variant of the Nintendo Switch eShop closed in China on March 31, 2026.

=== Currency ===
Unlike the Wii Shop Channel and the DSi Shop services, which use Nintendo Points for purchases, the Nintendo eShop lists prices in the appropriate regional currencies (e.g. United States dollars and euros). Accounts can be funded using either credit cards or prepaid cards purchased in stores.

In China, the Nintendo eShop was opened on December 10, 2019, via Nintendo Switch units distributed by Tencent. Users could only log in with a WeChat account, and the account could only be funded via WeChat Pay. In addition, purchasing downloadable content from other regions was disabled due to the lack of the ability to sign in with a Nintendo Account and the general region locking of the Nintendo Switch for the Chinese market. Nintendo's mainland Chinese subsidiary iQue originally launched the iQue 3DS XL in December 2012 with two digital games pre-installed, but the eShop itself was never launched for the console in China.

=== Downloading ===
When applications were downloaded on the 3DS they took up space on the system in Nintendo's form of storage called blocks. On Wii U and the Switch, however, this storage type, which was also used on consoles like the Wii, was replaced with the mostly universal Megabyte and Gigabyte memory format.

=== Multitasking ===
The Nintendo eShop can be accessed at any time via the HOME menu screen, even when a game is already running, on Wii U and Nintendo Switch. Background downloading is also possible via SpotPass while using any other application on the Wii U or Nintendo 3DS, and while in Sleep Mode on Nintendo Switch. Currently, 10 downloads can be queued at a time. The status of the downloads can be checked on the HOME menu under the "Download Manager". If notifications are activated, a pop-up message will appear in the top right corner of the screen to notify the user that a download is finished.

=== Ratings ===
The Nintendo eShop supported user reviews of games, applications, and other media on the Wii U and 3DS. After an eShop title had been acquired and used for at least one hour, users could submit a review consisting of a crescent range of one to five "stars", representing the title's quality. Users could also categorize games by age and gender, as suitable for hardcore or casual gamers. The Wii U had Miiverse integration for user reviews on the Nintendo eShop. The Switch though removed the feature of buyer's reviews, and they haven't come as of January 20th, 2025.

=== Deluxe Digital Promotion and Nintendo Network Premium ===
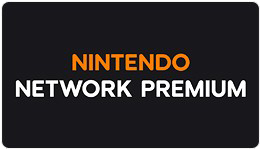
Nintendo Network Premium logo

On September 13, 2012, during a Japanese Nintendo Direct presentation, Satoru Iwata introduced a new service called Deluxe Digital Promotion (North America)/Nintendo Network Premium (Europe, Australia, and Japan). It was a loyalty program similar to PlayStation Plus offered on PlayStation Network and Xbox Live Gold on Xbox Live.

Consumers who purchased the Wii U Deluxe Pack in North America, or the Wii U Premium Pack in Europe and Japan, would receive a free two-year subscription to this service which lets Wii U owners receive points for each digital purchase.

Members who bought games and apps through the Wii U Nintendo eShop would receive ten percent of the price back in points, which could be exchanged for eShop credit on the Wii U and Nintendo 3DS eShop. Points could be exchanged for eShop credit through March 31, 2015.

The program was discontinued on April 1, 2015. The service was never fully implemented beyond its promotional period.

The My Nintendo program formerly featured a similar concept for anyone who links their Nintendo Network ID to their Nintendo Account profile, and users could earn Gold Points via any Nintendo eShop purchase. For a period of time, users were able to redeem Gold Points for download codes or discount coupons available on My Nintendo for specific Wii U and Nintendo 3DS titles. Gold Points themselves could still be used to discount any purchases made on the Nintendo Switch. The ability to earn Gold Points had been discontinued as of March 2025.

=== Nintendo 3DS and Wii U closures ===
A limited variant of the Nintendo eShop on the Nintendo 3DS family was discontinued on July 31, 2020, for various Latin American and Caribbean markets, as well as for the Southeast Asian and Middle Eastern markets. A limited variant of the Nintendo eShop on Wii U was also discontinued at the same day for said Latin American and Caribbean markets. As of that date, the ability to download, redownload, and update any software became unavailable, and games using the eShop were also affected.

The ability to purchase, download, and play new content on the Nintendo eShop for the Wii U and the Nintendo 3DS was discontinued for the rest of the world on March 27, 2023, with the ability to add credit cards ceasing by May 23, 2022, followed by the inability to add funds by August 29 of the same year (except for users who linked their Nintendo Network ID with their Nintendo Account, who could add funds until March 27, 2023). Redeeming download codes for the systems were extended to April 4. Redownloading previously purchased content, updating and free themes will remain available. Merging funds left on a Nintendo Network ID with a Nintendo Account remained active until March 11, 2024. Previously downloaded content on the Nintendo eShop, among others, was unaffected by the suspension of the Nintendo Network and other Wi-Fi services for the 3DS and Wii U on April 8, 2024.

== List of available content ==
The following types of games, applications and media are or were available to download from the Nintendo eShop.

Content	Pricing type(s)	Nintendo Switch and Nintendo Switch 2	Wii U	Nintendo 3DS family
Video Game Software
Download Software	Free and Purchase	Yes	Discontinued (redownloadable)	
Retail games	Purchase	Yes	Discontinued (redownloadable)	
Add-on content	Free and Purchase	Yes	Discontinued (redownloadable)	
Updates	Free	Yes		
Demos	Free	Yes	Discontinued (redownloadable)	
Nintendo & Sega 3D Classics	Purchase	No		Discontinued (redownloadable)
DSiWare games	Purchase (Transferable from Nintendo DSi for free)	No		Discontinued (redownloadable)
Virtual Console
Famicom/NES	Purchase and Subscription	Available via the Nintendo Classics service for Nintendo Switch Online subscribers	Discontinued (redownloadable)	Discontinued (redownloadable); Some NES games were available through Nintendo 3D Classics only
Super Famicom/Super NES	Purchase and Subscription	Available via the Nintendo Classics service for Nintendo Switch Online subscribers	Discontinued (redownloadable)	Discontinued (redownloadable); Available for "New" systems only
Nintendo 64	Purchase and Subscription	Available via the Nintendo Classics service for Nintendo Switch Online Expansion Pack subscribers	Discontinued (redownloadable)	No
GameCube	Purchase and Subscription	Available via the Nintendo Classics service for Nintendo Switch Online Expansion Pack subscribers on Nintendo Switch 2 systems	Select GameCube games ported as Wii games under the New Play Control! label (redownloadable)	No
Master System	Purchase	Available through SEGA AGES	Previous ownership on Wii mode only	Select games available through Sega 3D Classics compilations
Sega Genesis	Purchase and Subscription	Available via the Nintendo Classics service for Nintendo Switch Online Expansion Pack subscribers	Previous ownership on Wii mode only	Games were available through Sega 3D Classics only (redownloadable)
PC Engine/TurboGrafx-16	Purchase	Select compilations only	Discontinued (redownloadable)	Discontinued (redownloadable); Japanese systems only
Neo Geo	Purchase	Available through ACA NEOGEO (MVS mode only)	Previous ownership on Wii mode only	No
MSX	Purchase	Available through EGGCONSOLE worldwide	Discontinued (redownloadable); Was available only in Japanese systems	No
Commodore 64	Purchase	Select compilations only	Previous ownership on Wii mode only Available only for systems outside Japan	No
Arcade games	Purchase	Available through Arcade Archives	Previous ownership on Wii mode only	Select games were available through 3D Classics only (redownloadable)
Game Boy	Purchase and Subscription	Available via the Nintendo Classics service for Nintendo Switch Online subscribers	Select games demoed through Super Smash Bros. for Wii U	Discontinued (redownloadable)
Game Boy Color	Purchase and Subscription	Available via the Nintendo Classics service for Nintendo Switch Online subscribers	No	Discontinued (redownloadable)
Game Boy Advance	Free, Purchase and Subscription	Available via the Nintendo Classics service for Nintendo Switch Online Expansion Pack subscribers	Discontinued (redownloadable)	Discontinued (redownloadable); Nintendo 3DS Ambassador Program only
Nintendo DS / DSi	Purchase	Select compilations only	Discontinued (redownloadable); Common DS games only	Backward compatibility with DS & DSi cards Select DSiWare were available on the eShop (redownloadable)
Game Gear	Purchase	Select compilations only	No	Discontinued (redownloadable)
Picture
Screenshots	Free	HD		2D and 3D
Video
Game videos (including trailers, behind the scenes, interviews, commercials, and promotional videos)	Free	HD	HD and SD	2D and 3D
Video walkthroughs	Free	HD	HD and SD	2D and 3D
Other
Apps and services	Free and Purchase	Yes	Discontinued	

== Downloadable software ==
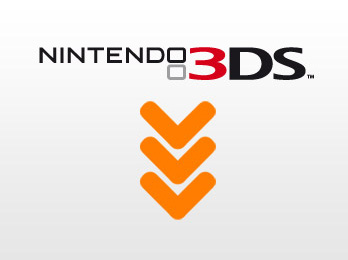
Nintendo 3DS Download Software logo

=== Retail releases ===
The majority of Nintendo 3DS, Wii U, Nintendo Switch, Nintendo Switch 2, and select Wii retail releases are on the Nintendo eShop. The first was New Super Mario Bros. 2, launched on the Nintendo 3DS eShop alongside its retail release in August 2012. A system update in March 2013 allowed players to transfer save data from a physical version of a game to a download version.

=== Download-only releases ===
Any video game company, particularly independent video game developers, may publish via the Nintendo eShop as download-only software for the Nintendo 3DS, Wii U, and Nintendo Switch. Various games, which may be sold as retail games in some regions, might be released as download-only software in others for various reasons, such as cost-effective localization.

==== 3D Classics ====
3D Classics is a series of NES/Famicom, Arcade, Mega Drive/Genesis, Master System, and SG-1000 games remade with added 3D visuals and updated features, although the overall graphics retain their original art style and appearance. These are exclusive to the Nintendo 3DS family.

=== Add-on content ===
Add-on content includes downloadable content (DLC) or microtransactions to augment existing games with new features, and patches. This content can both be free to download or purchasable. Add-on software can be added to both downloadable and physical games, and be purchased either individually or via in-game stores.

=== Demos ===
As of December 6, 2011, a system update upgraded the service to feature downloadable demos of retail games and eShop games. Developers have the option to limit access to demos, such as limiting the number of plays available to the user. When the number of plays reaches zero, the demo cannot be opened. The first paid demo was released in Japan on August 4, 2011, and free demos were further released in Japan on December 27, of the same year and in North America on January 19, 2012. As of December 9, 2013, Nintendo Network IDs were implemented onto the Nintendo 3DS, becoming required for downloading free demos from the eShop.

=== Software updates ===
Software updates, more commonly known as patches, have been available on both Nintendo 3DS, since April 25, 2012, and Wii U, since November 18, 2012, via a system update. These system updates gave the ability to patch downloadable and retail releases, through both the Nintendo eShop and HOME Menu. These patches have the main purpose of fixing security vulnerabilities and other bugs and improving usability or performance. Patches can also be downloaded while using other applications via the systems' Download Manager.

== Virtual Console ==
Virtual Console (バーチャルコンソール, Bācharu Konsōru), sometimes abbreviated as VC, was a specialized section of the Nintendo eShop that allowed players to purchase and download games and software for Nintendo's 3DS and Wii U consoles that were games from older systems like the NES, Game Boy, and SNES.

=== Nintendo 3DS ===
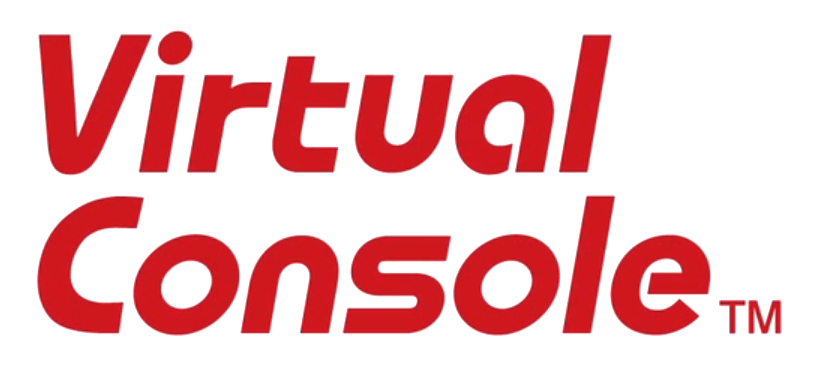
Logo used on the 3DS

The Nintendo 3DS used the HOME Menu and Nintendo eShop to access and purchase Virtual Console games, respectively. Virtual Console games on the Nintendo 3DS can be suspended and users can also create save states anytime. Functionality is available to display the games at native resolution.

Games for the Game Boy, Game Boy Color, Game Boy Advance (for Nintendo 3DS Ambassadors only), NES, Super NES (New Nintendo 3DS exclusive), Game Gear, and PC Engine (Japan only) were available on the eShop.

Twenty free NES and Game Boy Advance games were available to 3DS owners who became eligible in the Ambassador Program (users who logged onto the Nintendo eShop before August 12, 2011, and did not erase their eShop details). Special features in this interpretation of the Virtual Console allowed players to create Restore Points, temporarily saving the game state for use later, and the optional ability to view games in their original resolution accompanied with special borders or templates.

Game Boy Advance games can be displayed at their original screen resolution like other Virtual Console games but they do not support Sleep Mode, Restore Points, and HOME Menu functionality while the game is running.

The New 3DS, New 3DS XL, and New 2DS XL were the only consoles able to play the Super NES Virtual Console.

=== Wii U ===
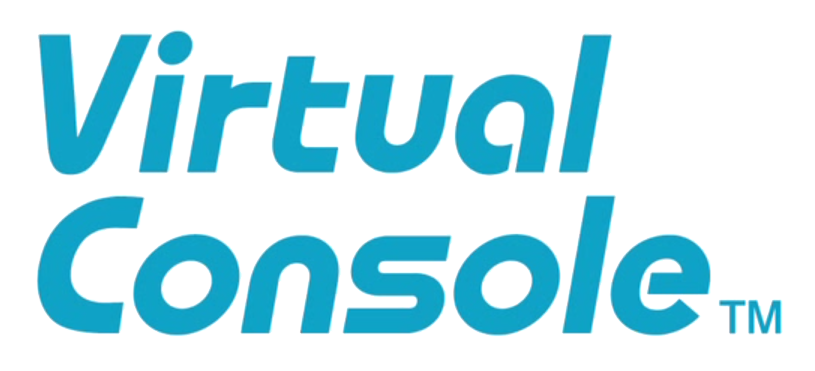
Logo used on the Wii U

The Wii U used the Wii U Menu and Nintendo eShop to access and purchase Virtual Console games, respectively. Virtual Console games on the Wii U can be suspended and users can also create save states anytime. The GamePad is only compatible with these games through Off-TV Play.

Select games from the NES, SNES, Nintendo 64, Game Boy Advance, and Nintendo DS libraries were available for purchase on the eShop. Most of the Virtual Console library available on the original Wii was also available on Wii U through the implementation of the console's Wii Mode and Wii Shop Channel, to access and purchase Virtual Console games. Wii Virtual Console games cannot be controlled using the Wii U GamePad, though the current versions of the system software support displaying Wii Virtual Console games on the GamePad screen as if playing any other Wii game.

== WiiWare ==
WiiWare, for the Wii video game console, has been available for the Wii U since launch day when an update added support for the Wii Shop Channel's library of WiiWare games. Unlike DSiWare on the Nintendo 3DS, WiiWare software is only available for download on the Wii U through Wii Mode, not the Nintendo eShop. Similarly to using Wii software on the Wii U, WiiWare can only be played in its original resolution, via Wii Mode, and Wii U Home Menu functionality is disabled while WiiWare software is being played. Prior to the Wii Shop Channel's closure, there were over 450 downloadable games available in North America as of October 2012. Initially all games except LostWinds were published on the Wii U. LostWinds had since been patched and made available for transfer and purchase on the Wii U. It was discontinued in January 2019.

== DSiWare ==
DSiWare, for the Nintendo DSi handheld game console, has been available for the Nintendo 3DS since June 2011, when the Nintendo eShop was first introduced. With a few exceptions for certain games or applications such as Flipnote Studio, the majority of existing DSiWare software is available for download on the Nintendo 3DS through the Nintendo eShop. Similar to using Nintendo DS software, DSiWare can be optionally viewed in its original resolution and Home Menu functionality, SpotPass, StreetPass, Auto Brightness (New Nintendo 3DS only) and 3D Functionality is disabled whilst DSiWare software is being played. There are over 550 downloadable DSiWare games available in North America as of January 2016. DSiWare games and software on the Nintendo eShop are largely priced near-identically as on the original DSi Shop. Online functionality has been defunct in DSiWare games due to the Nintendo Wi-Fi Connection service ceasing operations as of May 20, 2014. As of March 27, 2023, DSiWare games and apps are no longer available for purchase, coinciding with the worldwide closure of the Nintendo eShop for Nintendo 3DS.

== Video services ==
The Nintendo eShop offers a wide range of video streaming applications, which correspond to third party streaming services. Some of these services' applications are available for download on Nintendo 3DS and are preinstalled on North American Wii U consoles, such as Netflix, Hulu, and Amazon Prime Video applications. These streaming services are available independently from Nintendo Network services.

Additionally, some videos can either be downloaded to the system's memory through SpotPass. On the Nintendo 3DS, many of these videos are offered in autostereoscopic 3D; on the Wii U, only 2D high definition videos are available. The exact content available varies by region.

Content	Free or Subscription	Nintendo Switch	Wii U	Nintendo 3DS
Video services integrated within Nintendo TVii (cancelled in PAL regions)
Hulu (Japan and United States only)	Subscription	No	Discontinued	No
Amazon Prime Video (United States only)	Purchase (Optional Amazon Prime subscription available)	No	Discontinued	No
Netflix	Subscription	No	Discontinued	No
TiVo (DVR service officially announced but never released)	Purchase	No	Discontinued	No
Standalone video services
Netflix	Subscription	No	Delisted	
Hulu (United States only)	Subscription	Delisted		
Hulu Japan (Japan only; wholly separate service from American Hulu.)	Subscription	Yes	No	No
Prime Video (North America and Europe)	Purchase (Optional Amazon Prime subscription available)	No	Delisted	No
LoveFilm (Europe only)	Subscription	No	Delisted in favor of Amazon Video	No
YouTube	Free	Yes	Delisted	
Nintendo Video	Free	No		Disabled
YNN! (Japan only)	Subscription	No	Delisted	No
Nico Nico (Japan only)	Free	Yes	Delisted	
Crunchyroll (North America, Latin America, Europe and Oceania only)	Free and Subscription	Yes	Delisted	No
Funimation (North America, Latin America, Europe, and Oceania only)	Subscription	Delisted	No	
Tencent Video (Tencent Nintendo Switch units in Mainland China only)	Free and Subscription	Yes	No	
Twitch	Free and Subscription	Delisted	No	
AbemaTV (Japan only)	Free and Subscription	Yes	No	
Online Shows
Nintendo Direct conference videos	Free	Yes	Discontinued	
Nintendo eShop News	Free	No	Discontinued	
Other video services
Short Films	Free and Purchase	No		Discontinued (redownloadable)
Other services
InkyPen	Subscription	Yes	No	
Izneo	Subscription	Delisted	No	
Napster (Europe only)	Subscription	No	Disabled	No
Watchup	Free	No	Disabled	No

=== Discontinued services ===
- SpotPass TV – ceased operations on June 20, 2012.
- Eurosport – ceased operations on December 31, 2012.
- Hulu app shut down in 2019 for the Wii U and 3DS.

==== Nintendo Unleashed ====
Nintendo Unleashed was a video gaming online magazine published by Future Publishing for Nintendo Network. It is produced by the team behind the Official Nintendo Magazine and features video reviews and previews and footage of upcoming and recently released Nintendo games. Episodes are released monthly on the Nintendo eShop, Nintendo Channel and YouTube where users can watch all the latest news, reviews and previews of Wii, Wii U, Nintendo DS, Nintendo 3DS and Virtual Console games. The show's original name and format was called Nintendo TV. The show ended sometime in 2014 before the Official Nintendo Magazine ceased publication.

==== Nintendo Show 3D ====
Nintendo Show 3D was a video gaming online show produced by Nintendo and hosted by Jessie Cantrell. It featured video previews and footage of upcoming and recently released Nintendo 3DS retail and downloadable games. Episodes were released every two weeks on the Nintendo eShop free of charge. This series was exclusive to North American Nintendo 3DS consoles. Nintendo Show 3D released its last episode on March 28, 2013, two years after the North American release of the original Nintendo 3DS.

==== Nintendo eShop News ====
Japan exclusive news video conferences hosted by Satoru Iwata.

=== Short films ===
The Nintendo eShop offers a wide range of downloadable video content for the Nintendo 3DS. These videos are mostly offered in 3D and are downloaded to the system's storage. To produce and distribute these short films, Nintendo partnered with companies such as Breakthru Films, Black Box Productions, Atlantic Productions, Ka-Ching Cartoons and DreamWorks Animation.

== Litigation ==
The Norwegian Consumer Council (NCC) filed suit against Nintendo in February 2018, asserting that the eShop's policy on pre-order refunds violated European consumer law. As the NCC outlined, while European law requires digital storefronts to provide refunds on pre-orders, Nintendo bypassed this for the Switch eShop by having the user click an acknowledgement checkbox that waived their rights to refunds. NCC argued this violated the EU's Consumer Rights Directive 2011 as all pre-orders must be able to be refunded. Nintendo cited that under the directive that offering the checkbox to waive this right was valid. The German Federation of Consumer Organisation (Verbraucherzentrale Bundesverband e. V., or VBEV) took the lead on the lawsuit by December 2018 as Nintendo's European headquarters were located in Großostheim.

The Regional Court of Frankfurt ruled in December 2019 for Nintendo, but both the NCC and VBEV appealed the decision. During the appeal, in September 2020 Nintendo changed its pre-order policy to allow refunds for games but only a week before the game is scheduled for release. Despite this change, the Higher Regional Court of Frankfurt reversed the lower court's decision and ruled against Nintendo in December 2021, stating that its policy still violated the EU consumer's directive, as "the prerequisites for the right of revocation were not met, as the download made available after the pre-order did not yet contain any usable game."

== See also ==
- Nintendo Network
- PlayStation Store
- Xbox Games Store
