= Club Nintendo =

Defunct customer loyalty program by Nintendo

- Logo, depicting stylized artwork of Mario's cap
- Developer: Nintendo
- Type: Loyalty program Magazine
- Launched: EU: May 3, 2002; JP: October 31, 2003; AU: April 24, 2008; NA: October 2, 2008
- Discontinued: June 30, 2015 (North America); September 30, 2015 (Europe, Australia, and Japan)
- Status: Discontinued; replaced by My Nintendo
- Website: club.nintendo.com (redirects to my.nintendo.com)

Club Nintendo (stylized as club. nintendo) was a customer loyalty program and magazine that was provided by Nintendo. The loyalty program was free to join and provided rewards in exchange for consumer feedback and loyalty to purchasing official Nintendo products. Members of Club Nintendo earned credits or "coins" by submitting codes found on Nintendo products and systems, which could be traded in for special edition items only available on Club Nintendo. Rewards included objects such as playing cards, tote bags, controllers, downloadable content, and warranty extensions on select Nintendo products.

On January 20, 2015, it was announced that Club Nintendo would be discontinued in North America on June 30, 2015, and in Europe and Japan on September 30, 2015, due to the launch of My Nintendo the following year. Flipnote Studio 3D later became available to all North American Club Nintendo members for free for a limited time, and users who signed up to the European version of the new loyalty program during the launch period received Flipnote Studio 3D for free.

On March 17, 2015, after suddenly announcing their business partnership venture with DeNA, Nintendo stated that they were working with them on a new cross-platform membership service called My Nintendo to supersede Club Nintendo for the Wii U, Nintendo 3DS, and Nintendo Switch, alongside other devices such as tablets, smartphones and PCs. It was initially launched in Japan on March 17, 2016, alongside Nintendo's first mobile title, Miitomo.

== Publications ==
=== Europe ===
In Europe, Club Nintendo was the name of three magazines which started publishing in 1989. The European version was published in several languages, and there were separate publications for Germany, Spain, Greece, Cyprus, Austria, Switzerland, France, Belgium, Luxembourg, the Netherlands, Portugal, Sweden, Denmark, Norway, Finland, Italy, Hungary, Slovenia, Czech Republic, Slovakia, Serbia, Montenegro and South Africa. All were later discontinued and eventually replaced. The last German issue was published in August 2002.

=== Latin America ===
Club Nintendo was the name of the official Nintendo magazine in Mexico, Colombia, Venezuela, Argentina, Bolivia, Peru and Chile.

In Mexico, The magazine was founded in December 1991 by José "Pepe" Sierra and Gustavo "Gus" Rodríguez, which had previously worked on a bulletin for one of Nintendo's official stores in Mexico City. It was the first magazine in Mexico about Nintendo made by fans of video games, and quickly became the leading game magazine in Mexico. In January 2015 it changed to an online-only format, with December 2019 being its last issue.

=== Australia ===
In Australia Club Nintendo was a magazine that started in 1991 and was published by Catalyst Publishing in Melbourne. Roughly 31 pages in length, it featured very few screenshots of games. Australia eventually received their own version of Nintendo Magazine System by which time this magazine had ceased. Catalyst Publishing later took over Nintendo Magazine System in 1996 from the previous publisher.

== Loyalty program ==
The Club Nintendo loyalty program offers rewards to members who collect points (sometimes referred to as "Stars" or "Star Points", the program is also commonly known as the Stars Catalogue; the North American Club uses "Coins") which are gained primarily by purchasing and registering certain first-party hardware and software titles by Nintendo. Points are also awarded for the purchase of select third-party titles, and can also be obtained by participating in surveys, inviting others to become a Club Nintendo member or even simply visiting a web site.

Rewards range from digital content such as computer wallpaper, mobile phone ringtones, to a limited run of physical items such as keyrings, calendars, tote bags, exclusive pins, t-shirts, other clothing items, soundtrack albums, and game controllers. Premium rewards included Club Nintendo exclusive video games, offered as either digital content (WiiWare, DSiWare) or a physical item (Wii, DS). Many reward items were exclusive to particular Club Nintendo territories, and physical items sometimes were only available in limited quantities.

=== Japan ===
Club Nintendo (Japanese: クラブニンテンドー) is an official Nintendo club for Japanese fans. It launched on October 31, 2003, and was the second Nintendo reward program to be set (Coming after the European Nintendo VIP 24:7 program) but was the first to be called Club Nintendo.

The Japanese Club Nintendo offers rewards such as Wii Remotes with television remote control functionality, exclusive and unreleased to market games such as Tingle's Balloon Fight DS and Exclamation Warriors Sakeburein, game soundtrack CDs (like Touch! Generations Soundtrack) and exclusive accessories such as a Super Famicom style Classic Controller for the Wii.

=== Europe ===
Club Nintendo in Europe was launched as Nintendo VIP 24:7 on May 3, 2002, to coincide with the European launch of the GameCube. It promised exclusive news, reviews, previews and forums to members. However, because released titles are often delayed in European countries (usually due to localization), the exclusive features could be often found elsewhere on the Internet. To coincide with the release of the Wii, VIP 24:7 was renamed to Club Nintendo and adopted the Japanese Club Nintendo logo.

The Club Nintendo of Europe featured a Star Points system, where members could exchange stars earned by registering games and consoles for items in the Stars Catalogue, and for Wii Points to use in the Wii Shop Channel, which were available only in sets of 100, 300, 500 and 1000 Points. Originally, a maximum of two Wii Points Cards per day and per account were available for purchase; this later changed to one a day. Starting in September 2008, stars could also be used to buy singles and albums at the music online store, emusu.com, a website of which has shutdown.

Members enter PIN codes found on inserts included with certain games and hardware to earn stars. These can range from 100 to 1000 stars in value. Upon registering as a member on Nintendo of Europe's website, one is rewarded with 250 stars. Encouraging other people to register with Nintendo of Europe earns members 250 stars per sign-up. After registering, members can choose to receive special emails from Nintendo, which can include surveys which also reward members with stars. Daily visits to the website also once earned members 5 stars per day, but this was later removed.

=== North America ===
In 2002, a registration program titled My Nintendo (not to be confused with the loyalty program of the same name, My Nintendo) began in North America. It allowed consumers to register their games and consoles online using a printed code included with the products, with no direct physical rewards or benefits for doing so. Questions began being raised over Club Nintendo's conspicuous absence in the region by 2005. In 2007, then-vice president of Marketing and Corporate Affairs for Nintendo of America Inc. (NOA) Perrin Kaplan stated that the inclusion area of the United States is much larger than all the other Club Nintendo countries, and that the program was considered prohibitively expensive to set up. Kaplan also said that the company considered the pre-order bonuses and game registration promos it offered were an alternative to Club Nintendo. Nintendo of America ultimately relented due to customer demand and announced a Club Nintendo program for North America in October 2008.

The program was launched on December 15, 2008, retiring the My Nintendo registration program. The site experienced high traffic at its initial launch, resulting in login problems and slow load times for users. It was taken offline on December 24, 2008, reopening almost a week later on December 30 with noticeable infrastructure improvements. The North America catalog was developed in conjunction with Nintendo Australia and uses Coins instead of Stars.

Program participants who meet 300-Coin "Gold" or 600-Coin "Platinum" benchmarks within the Club Nintendo year (July 1–June 30) also receive exclusive items. Platinum Rewards are usually premium items, such as plush hats or posters. However, in 2014, there were no physical rewards for either Platinum or Gold, instead a selection of Wii/3DS games which were already released on the eShop were offered. In the past, some of the most notable Platinum Member rewards were a special standalone WiiWare version of Punch-Out!! titled Doc Louis's Punch-Out!! and a plastic statuette featuring the main characters from the Mario games. An advertisement for this was made in Punch-Out!! on the Wii, where if the player was losing, Doc Louis would say "Join The Nintendo Fun- uh I mean Club Nintendo today, Mac". This has been made a popular internet joke.

In 2011, Nintendo of America started offering download codes for downloadable games as rewards, available for the Nintendo 3DS and the Wii U consoles as well as the Wii or the Wii U via Wii Mode, of which would typically range from 100 to 250 coins. There were eight games offered (originally two to four), which would change roughly each month. When orders for the non-game rewards were closed from April 18, 2014, until May 13, 2014, 5 different games were added, making a total of 9 games.

=== Oceania ===
Club Nintendo in Australia was launched on April 24, 2008, to coincide with the release of Mario Kart Wii, with the website, catalogue and product registration going live on March 11, 2009, using the same system offered by Nintendo of Europe. Nintendo Australia asserted that the Australian Club Nintendo reward catalogue would be unique from that of Club Nintendo Europe and Club Nintendo Japan, and was developed in conjunction with Nintendo of America. However, unlike its North American counterpart, the Australian service used Stars instead of Coins – the same as its European counterpart.

Most games either distributed or published by Nintendo Australia after Mario Kart Wii contained a card that allows buyers to register their games for Club Nintendo points.

Club Nintendo Australia was available for both Australians and New Zealanders, as Nintendo Australia manages Nintendo's operations in New Zealand as well.

=== South Africa ===
Club Nintendo launched in South Africa in June 2008.

== Other ==
Club Nintendo was also the name given to a customer service program operating in Spain in the 1990s. Players buying a console, a video game or an accessory were able to fill a form and send it to Nintendo's headquarters in the country by mail. After doing it, the player would receive a Club Nintendo plastic card with their name, an associate number, the image of Mario and Nintendo's logo. The main purpose of this was to receive telephone support about clues and tricks on how to progress through the games and being able to receive the Club Nintendo magazine for free during a year.

== Criticism ==
Some criticism came from the fact that the Nintendo of Europe Stars Catalogue was only available to members in the United Kingdom and Ireland, the Netherlands, Germany, Belgium, France, Spain, Italy and later Portugal and Russia. Bergsala, which was responsible for all Nintendo-related distribution in Scandinavia, closed down Club Nintendo in the region at the end of the year 2006 because it was not economically viable to keep it going. In 2014, the American Club Nintendo came under fire for offering only digital games for its Platinum and Gold members, who need to spend much money to get to that position and were offered games they had already purchased. During the same timeframe, news sites repeatedly pointed out that Nintendo of America's offerings were much smaller than those of Europe and Japan. Digital Downloads were only available on the European (UK) Club Nintendo from the middle of March 2015 compared to the American Club Nintendo that had them for two additional months.

== Discontinuation ==
On January 20, 2015, Nintendo announced that it would be discontinuing Club Nintendo in all regions during the year, and succeeding it with a new loyalty program that the company has named My Nintendo. Prior to this announcement, in September 2014 the company had major changes done to the Japanese edition of Club Nintendo, including abolishing member rank and making hardware ineligible for registration, including the then-upcoming New Nintendo 3DS. This was later partially reflected on the Australian Club Nintendo, as members could not register the New Nintendo 3DS either, which was available in the region since November 2014. Throughout 2014, the North American Club Nintendo was experiencing a great lack of physical rewards compared to other regions.

In North America on February 2, 2015, Nintendo released a final batch of games with 117 titles (118 with the Club Nintendo exclusive title Grill-Off with Ultra Hand!, which was previously available). Among the final batch of games was also Doc Louis's Punch-Out!!, another previous Club Nintendo exclusive title. On January 20, 2015, products released after the date were not eligible for registration with Club Nintendo. The final day to earn Coins, register products with Club Nintendo, or sign up for new Club Nintendo membership was on March 31, 2015. In Europe, the final day was on October 1, 2015.

== Successor ==
My Nintendo (マイニンテンドー, Mai Nintendō) is a loyalty program provided by Nintendo, and the successor to Club Nintendo. The system rewards allows players to earn points from using software or purchasing games, which can then be spent on rewards such as digital games, physical items, or discounts. The program launched on March 17, 2016, in Japan and March 31, 2016, in the rest of the world, launching alongside Nintendo's first mobile app, Miitomo.
