= Nintendo Account =

User account system for Nintendo services

Nintendo Account is a single sign-on user account system used for Nintendo services on various platforms. Introduced in February 2016, it is used as the account system for Nintendo-published mobile apps, as well as the Nintendo Switch and Nintendo Switch 2 consoles and other services such as My Nintendo.

== History ==
Prior to his death in July 2015, Nintendo president Satoru Iwata secured a business alliance with Japanese mobile provider DeNA to develop mobile titles based on Nintendo's first-party franchises. During a presentation related to this business alliance on March 17, 2015, Iwata announced that a new membership program would be jointly developed by Nintendo and DeNA that encompasses the existing Nintendo 3DS and Wii U systems, smartphones and tablets, as well as a new gaming platform later revealed as the Nintendo Switch. According to Iwata, the new membership service would "create a connection between Nintendo and each individual consumer regardless of the device the consumer uses."

In anticipation of the launch of Nintendo's first app, Miitomo, as well as the launch of its new loyalty program, My Nintendo, Nintendo Account registration opened on February 17, 2016. Nintendo Account was extended to video game hardware with the March 2017 release of Nintendo Switch, where user profiles can be linked to an account for services such as online multiplayer and Nintendo eShop. In preparation for its release, the Nintendo Account ID system was introduced for display names. As of September 2018, Nintendo Accounts can no longer be unlinked from profiles on a Switch console. Nintendo eShop balances could also be merged between Nintendo Network and Nintendo Account profiles until March 2024.

In April 2020, Nintendo confirmed that up to 160,000 Nintendo Accounts were affected due to a leak of Nintendo Network ID (NNID) user and password information gained via credential stuffing from other breaches, which led to malicious users to use these accounts to purchase digital content on the owner's credit card or stored payment. By April 24, 2020, Nintendo disabled the NNID means to log into the Nintendo Account, emailed affected users to change their password, and recommended all users enable two-factor authentication for their Nintendo Account.

== Availability ==
Pre-registration for a Nintendo Account began on February 17, 2016, in 16 markets. A Nintendo Account is required to sign up on My Nintendo. On March 31, 2016, the Nintendo Account, and consequently My Nintendo, was released in 39 markets, and has since been released in more. As of March 2019, Nintendo Account recognizes up to 167 territories.

Similarly to predecessor Club Nintendo, as well as the Nintendo eShop, the Nintendo Network ID and My Nintendo, the Nintendo Account is not IP-restricted, and users from unlisted territories (as well as from listed territories with lesser services) can sign up for a Nintendo Account and use the service, in a country address different from their own without any known repercussions. However, persistent limits of the selected regional Nintendo eShop of choice applies. Regardless, the Nintendo Account is supported in more territories than Club Nintendo was, albeit many of the territories added later may be limited to only Nintendo mobile app support.

On May 31, 2023, Nintendo stopped operations in Russia through their European subsidiary, including payments on the Nintendo eShop and the creation of new Nintendo Accounts in the country. In addition, all payment information related to Russian consumers associated with their accounts was deleted.
