= Super Mario Run =

2016 mobile game

- Logo
- Developer: Nintendo EPD (Note: Additional work by DeNA and SRD)
- Publisher: Nintendo
- Director: Shigeru Miyamoto
- Producers: Takashi Tezuka; Shigeru Miyamoto
- Designer: Takashi Tezuka
- Series: Super Mario
- Engine: Unity (uncredited)
- Platforms: iOS; Android
- Release: iOS: WW: December 15, 2016; KOR: February 1, 2017; Android: NA/EU: March 22, 2017; EA/AU/HK/ROC: March 23, 2017
- Genres: Auto-running, platform
- Mode: Single-player

Super Mario Run (Note: Japanese: スーパーマリオ ラン, Hepburn: Sūpā Mario Ran) is a 2016 platform game developed and published by Nintendo for iOS and later Android. It is Nintendo's first mobile game that is part of one of the company's long-running and major franchises.

In Super Mario Run, the player controls Mario or other characters as they automatically run across the screen while timing jumps to collect coins and dodge enemies and hazards. As a Super Mario game, it contains a common plot wherein Mario must rescue Princess Peach, who has just been captured by Bowser. However, the player must also rebuild the Mushroom Kingdom destroyed by Bowser. The game had involvement of series creator Shigeru Miyamoto, and its development team consisted mostly of the original Super Mario development team, featuring many similar gameplay concepts adapted for ease of mobile controllers. The first four levels of Super Mario Run are free to play, but unlocking the rest of the game requires a one-time payment.

Super Mario Run received overall positive reviews by critics. Reviewers generally praised the game's replay value and addictive gameplay, though common criticism was directed towards its comparatively high price in the mobile market, as well as its required connectivity to the internet. With 50 million downloads, it became the most downloaded mobile game in the first week. The total figure of downloads was 300 million as of September 2018.

== Gameplay ==
Gameplay of Super Mario Run showing Mario standing on a pause block, halting his running as well as the timer at the top of the screen

Super Mario Run plays as a side-scrolling, auto-runner platform game. The plot begins with Mario accepting Princess Peach's invitation to her castle, only to witness Bowser kidnapping the Princess and destroying the Mushroom Kingdom, tasking Mario to undo his actions. Mario automatically runs from left to right and jumps on his own to clear small gaps or obstacles. The player can control Mario by tapping the touch screen to make him jump over larger obstacles; the longer the screen is touched, the higher he jumps. Like other Super Mario games, the player must maneuver Mario over gaps, onto enemies, and into coins to collect them. The player's end goal is to steer Mario safely across the level and reach the flagpole before time is exhausted and accumulate as many coins as possible. In addition to controlling when and how high he jumps, a hidden ability exists where the player swipes and holds the screen in the direction opposite of Mario, stalling his jumps during his descent and moving him slightly in that direction. Standing on pause blocks pauses the timer and Mario's running, and standing on blocks marked with directional arrows changes the direction of his jump. Bubbles are collectible items used to send him backward, letting the player repeat sections of the level. If a bubble is available, it is automatically used to rescue Mario from impending death. Otherwise, the player can only restart the level. Replayability comes from collecting all the normal coins and finding special coins in each level. First, the player must find five pink coins. Collecting those unlocks five purple coins and collecting those unlocks five black coins, so it takes at least three playthroughs to collect everything in a given level.

In addition to the main game, there is the "Toad Rally" game mode where players can challenge "ghost" versions of other players' prerecorded playthroughs of levels. Access to Toad Rally requires the player to use a Rally Ticket, which can be earned either through completing levels in the main game mode, trading My Nintendo coins, or other in-game tasks. Playing either game mode earns the player coins that can be used to buy items for creating and customizing their own "Mushroom Kingdom" in a third gameplay mode comparable to FarmVille. The player can gain or lose Toads that populate their Mushroom Kingdom in Toad Rallies. The player can unlock other characters to play as through these game modes, such as Luigi, Princess Peach, Toad, Toadette, and Yoshi. These characters have slightly different gameplay attributes; using the different characters is not required to complete any level, but they give players the tools for completing levels with different approaches.

Since launch, Nintendo has released updates introducing features and other changes. For example, a "Friendly Run" version of Toad Rally does not require any Rally Tickets, but can only be played up to five times per day, and will not earn the player coins for winning. An easy difficulty mode assists players having difficulty in beating levels in World Tour by granting them unlimited bubbles and removing the time limit. However, coins collected will not count while playing in that mode. Another update raised the maximum cap number of Toads from 9,999 to 99,999, and added support for Game Center and Google Play Games achievements. A later update added nine new levels, courses, Princess Daisy as a playable character, and buildings, all of which can be unlocked by completing various goals and challenges. The levels are themed as "a forest, a ship packed with coins, and a whole airship armada", and a new game mode, titled "Remix 10", has players run through ten very short levels in a random order, with each level only taking "a few seconds to complete."

== Development ==
The game was developed jointly by Nintendo and DeNA. Takashi Tezuka served as the game's designer and Shigeru Miyamoto as the producer and director. This was the first game that Miyamoto had been closely involved in its development since 2007's Super Mario Galaxy. The development team consisted mostly of the original Super Mario development team. Super Mario Run shares a similar 2.5D graphic style with New Super Mario Bros. The game's three gameplay modes were developed in parallel by separate groups within the development team. The game was built using the Unity engine. Shortly before release, Nintendo's Reggie Fils-Aimé said the game would not be coming to the Nintendo Switch, due to different development architecture.

Nintendo had been hesitant about developing titles for the mobile gaming market since its onset in the early 2010s, as the company was highly protective of its franchise characters and desired to have them only featured in games for their hardware. At that time, Nintendo president Satoru Iwata felt that by developing mobile titles, they would "cease to be Nintendo" and lose their identity. By 2014, the company recognized that the growth of the mobile market was impacting their financial performances, with sales of its hardware and software declining greatly and posting a $240 million loss for the financial year. By the next year, Iwata's views had shifted significantly, and he led Nintendo into a partnership with mobile developer DeNA to start bringing Nintendo's brands to mobile, including five planned Nintendo titles. The first of these was Miitomo, based on the Mii avatars used in Nintendo's console software. Separately, Nintendo collaborated with Niantic and The Pokémon Company to release Pokémon Go.

The concept of the game arose from ideas for new Mario games on the Wii, including one where the player would need to control Mario in time to the rhythm of the music. This concept was fleshed out further as part of New Super Mario Bros., but led to the idea of a simply-controlled game. Nintendo was also inspired by speedrunners, and had noticed that these players, in racing through the various Mario games, never let go of the forward direction control, effectively making Mario run all the time, and considered how to allow all players to have that experience. Similarly, they observed speedrunners were adept at performing certain types of difficult timed jumps that enabled quick completion times; Nintendo included special blocks that players would encounter in Super Mario Run to easily complete similar jumps, so that they could "give even beginner players an opportunity to get a taste for what's fun about the more skilled style of Mario play", according to Miyamoto. The game was developed to be played with the mobile device in a vertical orientation. This gave the developers more gameplay ideas to stretch the vertical space of the game, as well as to emphasize the simplicity of the game's controls.

Super Mario Run is the second mobile game under the DeNA partnership, and Nintendo's first mobile game to use one of their established intellectual properties. Miyamoto explained that some of their game franchises became increasingly more complex with every installment, making it difficult to attract new players, and that the company believed they could use mobile games with simplified controls not only to target the broadest audience of people, but also to draw them to their consoles by reintroducing these properties. While it would be possible for them to port their existing titles to mobile device with the creation of virtual controllers on the touchscreen, Miyamoto felt that would not be as "interesting", instead they were "more interested in looking at how we can be creative with Mario, and design for iPhones in a way that takes advantage of the uniqueness of that device and the uniqueness of that input and the features that that device has".

== Release and updates ==
The game was announced by Miyamoto on September 7, 2016, at Apple's annual iPhone event. The game initially launched in 10 languages in 150 countries. Super Mario Run was released on iOS devices on December 15, 2016, and on Android devices on March 22, 2017. For the iOS release, the game runs on both iPhone and iPad. While still using the freemium model, Nintendo eschewed requiring players to keep paying to access more levels, instead offering the game as a free demo with the first world unlocked and requiring a one-time payment to unlock the rest of the game. Part of the reason for this pricing scheme was to make it transparent to parents who may be purchasing the game for their children so that they would not incur further costs. Fearing piracy of the game, Nintendo added always-on DRM, which requires that players have a persistent Internet connection to play. Polygon speculated that Nintendo opted to develop the game first for the iOS platform because of its stronger security options and consistent ecosystem compared to Android.

Since its inception, Super Mario Run has seen updates that mostly expanded support for Nintendo accounts or added or changed gameplay content. An update released in January 2017 introduced "Easy Mode", reduced the number of Toads lost in Toad Rally, and added Korean language support. The game launched in South Korea on the same date. An April 2017 update allowed players to use Miitomo via their Nintendo Accounts to add friends already registered on their Nintendo Account, as well as customize their Mii icons, including implementing any costumes they own. A significant update in September that year added Daisy as a new character, World Star and the Remix 10 game mode.

== Reception ==
Reception

Aggregate score
Aggregator	Score
Metacritic	76/100

Review scores
Publication	Score
4Players	60/100
Destructoid	6/10
Edge	7/10
Electronic Gaming Monthly	6/10
Eurogamer	Recommended
Game Informer	7/10
GameSpot	7/10
GamesRadar+	4/5
GamesTM	6/10
IGN	8/10
Nintendo Life	8/10
Nintendo World Report	7.5/10
Pocket Gamer	4.5/5
Polygon	7/10
TouchArcade	3.5/5
USgamer	4/5

Upon release, Super Mario Run received "generally positive reviews" from critics, holding an aggregated Metacritic score of 76/100. Glixel stated that while the game was "deceptively simple" to play to reach the end of a level, it was "genuinely satisfying to work on the real meat of the game". IGN agreed, citing the game's addictive qualities and high replayability in its extra coin-collecting challenges, praising the game for successfully capturing the Super Mario charm, but criticizing it for lacking the originality in gameplay ideas that generally come with new entries in the series.

While the game received positive reviews from publications, players of the game were more critical. The BBC noted that the game's user-driven App Store rating after three days of release was 2.5 stars out of 5, with the most common complaints being about the need for a persistent Internet connection and the fixed US$10 price point compared to similar games on the store. The game's Toad Rally mode was a point of division for players, as while some praised the mode, others expressed concern that its competitive features would prevent players without high amount of skill from being able to advance development of their Mushroom Kingdom, as well as the Rally Ticket entry system being seemingly unnecessary for a game without microtransactions.

Industry analyst Michael Pachter suggested that the low user ratings reflect the non-traditional single-point-of-purchase approach for monetization, and that mobile gamers are more amenable towards free-to-play games that provide a larger amount of free content prior before any microtransactions are required to proceed forward. GamesIndustry.biz agreed, noted that mobile gamers have been highly critical of games with "hard" paywalls that require in-app purchases to continue, and the last several years of free-to-play mobile games has created consumers unwilling to pay for mobile games, a factor Nintendo will need to contend with for its future applications. Polygon considered that based on the negative feedback from players, that Nintendo kept too many of its own practices for its consoles and handhelds, such as the use of the Friend Code system and the lack of any planned expansions, into Super Mario Run, as well as eschewing typical mobile gaming practices, and believed that Nintendo should have worked better to adapt the game for the expectations of mobile gamers. Responding to the player complaints, Miyamoto acknowledged that Nintendo had made a mistake with the game's pricing. At The Game Awards 2017, it was nominated for "Best Mobile Game" and at the 17th Game Developers Choice Awards, it was nominated for "Best Mobile/Handheld Game".

=== Player count and revenue ===
Shortly after the game's announcement, Nintendo's stock soared to just under the high point it had reached after the release and success of Pokémon Go earlier in 2016. Financial analysts recognized that Super Mario Run would be more significant than Pokémon Go for Nintendo; whereas revenue from Pokémon Go must be split between Niantic and The Pokémon Company, nearly all revenue from Super Mario Run would go to Nintendo directly being an in-house developed title. After Super Mario Run's release date was announced in November, Nintendo's stock rose by 2.8%. Shortly before release, Nintendo provided a public look at the game during an episode of The Tonight Show Starring Jimmy Fallon featuring Nintendo of America president Reggie Fils-Aimé.

App-tracking service Apptopia reported that Super Mario Run was downloaded 2.85 million times on the day of its iOS release, while grossing over US$5 million. The title had 40 million downloads over the first four days, surpassing Pokémon Go as the most downloaded mobile game in the first week of release; that week's figure totaled over 50 million. App Annie estimates that about one million of those downloads lead to the user paying for the title, with 55 percent being from the United States, earning $14 million in sales. The iOS version of Super Mario Run was the tenth most downloaded app in 2016 and the top downloaded free game in 2017. With the company's end-year report for fiscal year 2016, which ended on March 31, 2017, the combined downloads for Super Mario Run across iOS and Android was approaching 150 million, and climbed to 200 million six months later.

Despite these numbers, the game missed some of the anticipated metrics, particularly in Japan. On the Monday following the game's release on iOS, Nintendo's and DeNA's stock price dropped over seven percent due to its poor market reception. By December 26, Super Mario Run was no longer the top grossing app in any nation, though remained one of the top downloaded apps in 63 countries. Nintendo's stocks had dropped over 18 percent within the first two weeks of release. Within three weeks, market analysis firm Newzoo estimated that the app had been downloaded over 90 million times, with approximately $30 million in revenue from the roughly three percent who had purchased the full game. Wall Street Journal's Dan Gallagher stated this conversion rate represented the difficulty in convincing mobile gamers to purchase content. Nintendo later reported in a total of 78 million downloads, with more than five percent paying for the full game, by January 2017 in fiscal year earnings report. This generated ¥6 billion ($53 million) in revenues from the game. The game sold 4 million paid downloads by this time.

Nintendo was anticipating that they would obtain 10 percent conversion of app downloads into full purchases, and noted in February 2017 that twenty countries account for 90 percent of the game's revenue, and that within those countries they were approaching this 10 percent conversion rate. However, Nintendo's president Tatsumi Kimishima was disappointed the next month, when the revenue from the iOS version failed to fulfill the company's expectations. Nintendo's next mobile title, Fire Emblem Heroes, released two months after Super Mario Run and which used the freemium payment approach, had only 10 percent of the previous title's downloads, yet had outperformed it in overall revenue by the end of Nintendo's fiscal year 2016. Kimishima said that Nintendo had learned several lessons in development and releasing of mobile games from Super Mario Run. Kimishima said that "we honestly prefer the Super Mario Run model", though in a June 2017 investor question-and-answer session, he said "in the future we will consider not only a single set price, but other methods that incorporate a wider variety of elements that allow as many consumers as possible to play", suggesting that Nintendo's mobile strategy may move away from the pay-once model.

Within days of the game's App Store release, journalists noted a number of unofficial video game clones that appeared on the Google Play store, which they believe was prompted by the lack of an Android version of Super Mario Run at the time and allowing developers to take advantage of uninformed consumers. In at least one case, an Android clone contained malware designed to collect sensitive information from a player's device. Super Mario Run was the most-downloaded game for Android devices in 2017.

By July 2018, Sensor Tower estimated that Super Mario Run had generated approximately US$60 million in revenue. As of September 2018, the game had been downloaded about 300 million times worldwide, with around 10 percent of those downloads originating in Japan. In January 2020, Super Mario Run was reported to be Nintendo’s most-downloaded mobile title, accounting for 244 million of the company’s 452 million total mobile game downloads. As of 2025, the game ranked as Nintendo’s fifth highest-grossing mobile title, with an estimated 384.4 million downloads and US$96.6 million in revenue.

== See also ==
- Sonic Runners
