= InkyPen =

2018 comics and manga reading application

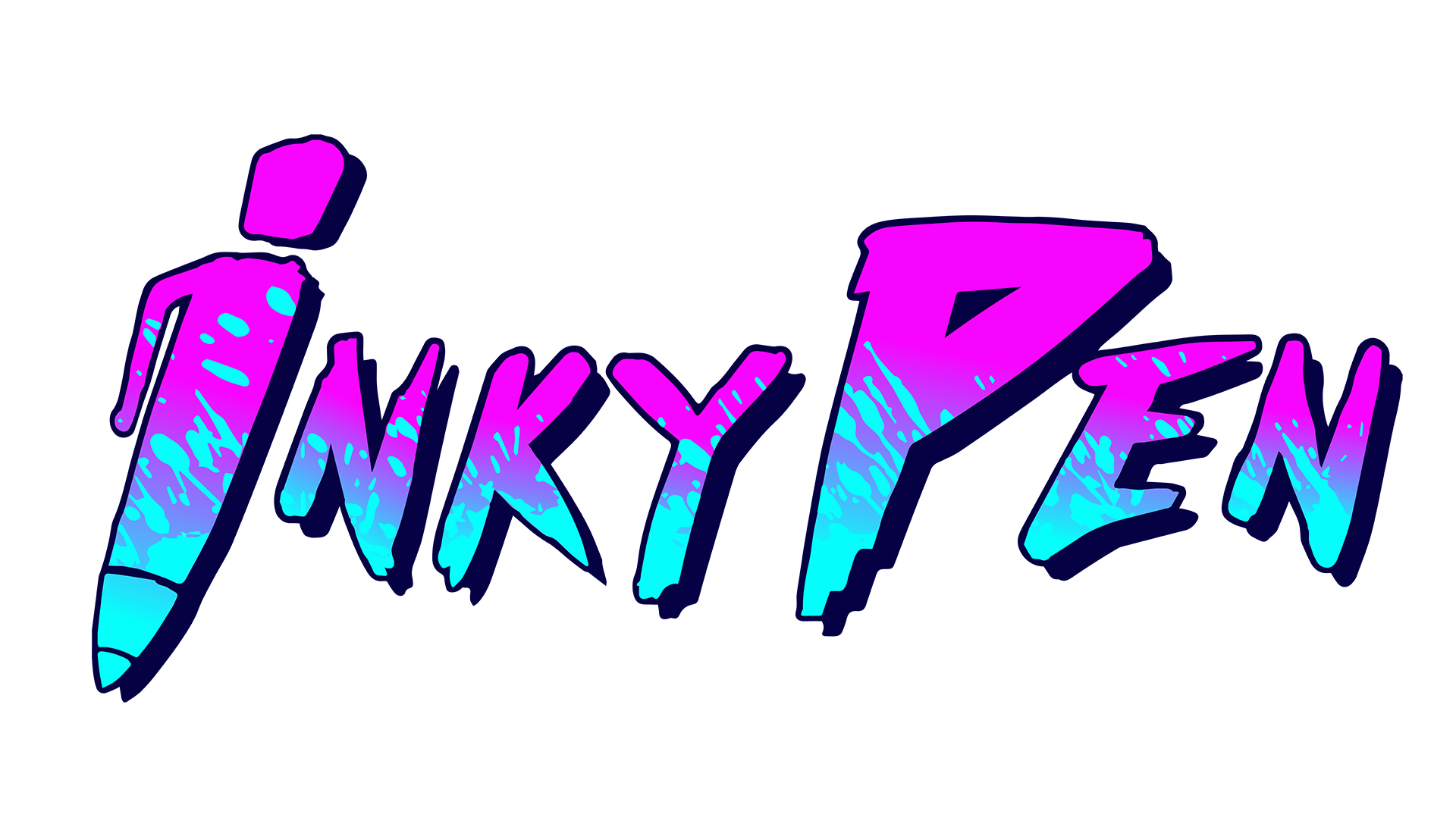
- Developer: InkyPen
- Platforms: Nintendo Switch, Microsoft Windows
- Release: Dec 17, 2018

InkyPen was a subscription-based comics and manga reading application on the Nintendo Switch, launched worldwide in most regions on December 17, 2018. Developed by a Norwegian startup company located in Norway also under the name of InkyPen.and in December 2025 they ceased operations

== History ==
InkyPen developers attended the GDC before launch on March 20, 2018. InkyPen launched on the Nintendo Switch on December 17, 2018, being one of the few non-gaming applications launched on the Nintendo Switch

InkyPen launched update 1.2.0 on March 16, 2020, allowing for reading in vertical mode while including performance updates.

InkyPen partnered with Kodansha USA on April 27, 2020, to provide manga through the InkyPen service. They also partnered with Rain Games and Studio Foglio to announce that InkyPen will assist Rain Games in adding a comics reader to the announced Girl Genius: Adventures in Castle Heterodyne video game. This arrangement also allowed for the Girl Genius comics to be freely readable on InkyPen.

As of June 2, 2025, the application is listed as one of the few applications unavailable on the Nintendo Switch 2.

InkyPen launched a Steam application on November 18, 2025. While active, InkyPen had cross-platform support, allowing users to log in to their accounts and utilize their subscriptions on all platforms InkyPen was available. On December 17, 2025, InkyPen announced they were declaring bankruptcy and servers would be shut down by the end of business on Friday, December 19. Developers announced that the app would be removed from Steam, unusable by people who had already downloaded due to servers going offline, and that all subscriptions would be cancelled.

== Partnerships ==
InkyPen has comics from publishers, Valiant Comics, Dynamite, IDW, Titan Comics, Humanoids Inc, Archie Comics, Studio Foglio, Dark Horse Comics, Andrews Mcmeel Universal, Papercutz, Daniel Lieske, Zilo Media, TPub Comics, Ubisoft Entertainment, Soaring Penguin Press, Snowcastle Games.
