= Fire Emblem Heroes =

2017 video game

- Original app icon
- Developer: Intelligent Systems (Note: Service infrastructure, My Nintendo integration, and development cooperation by DeNA)
- Publisher: Nintendo
- Directors: Kouhei Maeda; Shingo Matsushita
- Producers: Masahiro Higuchi; Yu Sasaki; Hideki Konno
- Programmers: Yuji Ohashi; Ryo Watanabe
- Writers: Kouta Nakamura; Kouhei Maeda; Satoko Kurihara; Yuu Ohshima
- Composer: Hiroki Morishita
- Series: Fire Emblem
- Platforms: Android, iOS
- Release: February 2, 2017
- Genre: Tactical role-playing
- Mode: Single-player

Fire Emblem Heroes (Note: Japanese: ファイアーエムブレム ヒーローズ, Hepburn: Faiā Emuburemu Hīrōzu) is a free-to-play tactical role-playing game developed by Intelligent Systems and published by Nintendo for Android and iOS. The game is a mobile spin-off of the Fire Emblem series featuring its characters, utilizing a more simplistic gameplay style as well as a gacha system in order to obtain characters from throughout the series. Fire Emblem Heroes was created as one of Nintendo's first attempts to create games for the mobile market, with developers at Intelligent Systems aiming to capture the core Fire Emblem gameplay formula while making it friendly for newcomers to the series. Heroes released worldwide on February 2, 2017. Since then, it has received consistent updates, which have added new gameplay modes and playable characters to the game.

At launch, Fire Emblem Heroes received a largely positive response from critics, who praised its gameplay and beginner friendliness, among other attributes. However, other critics felt the game's story was weak and that its stamina system at launch was detrimental to its playability. Fire Emblem Heroes received a number of awards and nominations in "Best Mobile Game" categories, and as of 2025 has grossed over $1.3 billion USD worldwide, becoming Nintendo's first mobile game to gross over $1 billion USD and the most profitable game in the Fire Emblem franchise. Characters and elements from the game would appear in other Nintendo and Fire Emblem series games following its release.

== Gameplay and plot ==
A sample map in Heroes. The area highlighted in red is the "Danger Area" that shows spaces within enemy attack range. Characters can be selected, and have their statistics and skills shown in the top section of the screen.

Fire Emblem Heroes is a tactical role-playing game. It uses a simplified version of the usual Fire Emblem gameplay style that removes many complex aspects of the main series, including "permadeath", a mechanic from the main series in which a character can no longer be used following their defeat in battle. In Fire Emblem Heroes, players control a team of up to four characters ("Heroes") against enemy teams of varying sizes on an 8x6 grid map. Different characters have different movement restrictions, with battlefields having numerous hazards that can restrict movement, such as destructible walls and mountainous terrain. The game strictly alternates between a player phase and an enemy phase every turn, with the player's units moving before the enemy's does soon after. In combat, heroes deal either physical or magical damage types; they also have a "color" that informs the player of a rock paper scissors-esque system that makes it so some units have advantageous match-ups over other units. If a hero is defeated in battle, they cannot be used again until after the battle is over. After combat, they will be restored to full health, but will not gain any experience points from the battle if they are defeated.

Battles available in the game include set story missions divided by chapters for the player to complete, rotating challenge missions, a training tower for increasing character's strength in random battles, and fights against other players' teams (albeit controlled by the game's AI) in the Arena. A form of player versus player combat was later added in 2021, dubbed Summoner Duels, which allow players to use their teams to battle against each other. Heroes will gain experience points by defeating enemies in these battles, but also gain "SP", which can be used to acquire skills that improve a hero's combat abilities. Another mechanic, "skill inheritance", allows characters to use weapons and skills that come from other heroes themselves.

The game has an in-game currency known as "orbs". Orbs are either earned by completing in-game activities or with in-app purchases. Orbs can be used to acquire new heroes, who primarily hail from prior Fire Emblem series games, via the game's "Summon" mechanic, which works on a gacha system. Random heroes are summoned using the orbs, with the heroes having a different star rating depending on strength; heroes of a lower star rating can be improved to a higher star rating using in-game items. If a player gains duplicates of the same character, the duplicates can be merged to create a single more powerful character. Though some heroes are obtained for free at the start of the game, most need to obtained using the summon mechanic. Other heroes can be gained for free by completing in-game missions of varying difficulty and effort. Other uses for orbs include to restore stamina. Missions cost stamina to play, and while stamina is recovered over time, players can either use orbs or a "stamina potion" item to replenish their stamina to full at any given time. The exact cost of missions and maximum of stamina held has varied over the course of the app. Orbs can also be used for other purchases, such as leveling up the player's "castle", which increases the amount of experience points gained in battles.

== Plot ==
The main conflict in Fire Emblem Heroes is a war between the nations of Askr and Embla. The protagonist, also known as the summoner, whose name can be chosen by the player, (Note: The default character name for the player is Kiran.) aids the Kingdom of Askr and its Order of Heroes, whose members include its Commander Anna, Prince Alfonse, and Princess Sharena. Embla is led by Princess Veronica and Prince Bruno. Both sides use summoned heroes from other worlds, with the other worlds being the settings of other Fire Emblem games. The story of the game is broken up into different "books", with each book having a different focus. Subsequent books focus on different realms based on those in Norse mythology: the second book focuses on Askr working alongside the kingdom of ice, Nifl, against the invading forces of Surtr, ruler of the kingdom of flame; the third focuses on a conflict with Hel, the realm of the dead; the fourth focuses on a conflict in the realm of dreams between the Dökkálfar and Ljósálfar; the fifth focuses on a conflict with Niðavellir, a technologically advanced realm; the sixth focuses on the resolution of the conflict between Askr and Embla as Askr tries to remove an Emblian bloodline curse; the seventh focuses on Askr working alongside Vanaheimr, the realm of light, to combat the threat of Gullveig, who can control time; the eighth focuses on a conflict against Yggdrasil; the ninth focuses on a conflict with Ásgarðr, who seek to capture a boy named Rune; and the tenth focuses on Rune, revealed to actually be the true Alfaðör and creator of all, summoning Fimbulvetr to attack and destroy Nifl.

== Development ==
Fire Emblem Heroes was initially conceived of by Nintendo, who at the time sought to expand into the mobile game market, and wanted a new Fire Emblem title as one of these titles. Fire Emblem Heroes is developed by Intelligent Systems, the studio within Nintendo that has produced the other games of the Fire Emblem series, with the company leading development of Heroes to ensure it would be a proper Fire Emblem game optimized for mobile devices. Many of Heroes' developers had also worked on the mainline Fire Emblem titles, and were heavily focused on ensuring the game's quality compared to mainline titles while maintaining a beginner-friendly, smaller-scale gameplay environment compared to them, notably in the form of the game's map design, which was kept smaller for simplicity. Kouhei Maeda and Shingo Matsushita serve as the directors of the game at Intelligent Systems and Nintendo, respectively. According to Matsushita, the game's free to play gameplay model was conceived of to allow for as many people to get interested in the game as possible. The overall development team also came up with the idea to bring back characters from prior games, with the team feeling as though the game's gacha mechanics would help players get familiar with characters from throughout the series they may be otherwise unfamiliar with.

The game was announced by Nintendo as the third mobile game made under the DeNA partnership in April 2016, alongside an Animal Crossing mobile game, and was originally set for release that year. The game's title and gameplay details were later revealed during a Nintendo Direct presentation in January 2017. Immediately afterwards, Nintendo launched an online "Choose Your Legends" promotion, in which players could vote for various characters from the series to be included in the game. The game was initially released in 39 countries for Android and iOS devices on February 2, 2017. As was the case with Nintendo's previously released mobile game Super Mario Run, Fire Emblem Heroes requires players to have an internet connection to play.

Since launch, the game has periodically released new characters and features. All characters in the game feature new artwork created specially for the game, with each hero also having unique voice lines. There are also many alternate variations of heroes that are added to the game present in different costumes, such as swimsuits. Matsushita compared a normal Fire Emblem game to a movie, and Heroes to a television series; there would be a constant demand for new "episodes", but there would also be a feedback loop between the producers and the players that could affect the initial vision of the product. In an interview with Polygon, Maeda stated that the development team constantly monitored player data for balancing purposes, changing things if they disrupted game balance and team diversity. Matsushita noted that the team was focused on combatting power creep, where new characters get more powerful as the game progresses and older units remain underpowered in comparison, as Matsushita wanted to ensure players could still continue to use their favorite characters as the game continued to expand. In an interview with Nintendo Life in 2019, Matsushita stated that the team's goals largely focused around adding new modes and expanding upon the game's original story, with the team taking player feedback to improve upon the game where possible.

The game features a number of in-game microtransactions, predominantly in the form of letting players buy orbs. The game was shut down in Belgium in 2019 due to legislation regarding gambling in video games in the country. In 2020, the Feh Pass was announced. The Feh Pass serves as a monthly subscription service, costing $9.49 USD per month, with the Pass letting players get extra rewards and other bonuses.

== Reception ==
Reception

Aggregate score
Aggregator	Score
Metacritic	72/100

Review scores
Publication	Score
Destructoid	8/10
Easy Allies	2.5/5
Game Informer	7.25/10
GameSpot	6/10
IGN	7.4/10
Nintendo Life	7/10
Nintendo World Report	8/10
Pocket Gamer	7/10
RPGFan	75%
TouchArcade	4/5
VentureBeat	80/100
Hobby Consolas	79/100

At the time of the game's release, Fire Emblem Heroes received mixed reception, according to review aggregator platform Metacritic. Critics felt as though the game was easy to start, enjoying the gameplay's strategy, beginner-friendliness, and similarity to mainline Fire Emblem gameplay. Others positively highlighted the game's presentation, such as its artstyle, voice acting, and soundtrack. Allegra Frank, writing for Polygon, found the game to be an entertaining adaptation of the traditional Fire Emblem gameplay style, though she felt the game's summoning system made it hard for players to obtain and use their favorite characters. Thomas Whitehead of Nintendo Life found the game to be best enjoyed in short bursts rather than long sessions, similarly finding it a game that was easy to start. GamingBolt's Shubhankar Parijat also found the game to be best enjoyed in smaller sessions, as due to the more simplified gameplay system, gameplay could become repetitive in longer sessions.

Nick Dincola, writing for PopMatters, criticized the game, finding its story and character writing weak, with Dincola feeling as though the game did not do anything to add on players' past attention to the series' characters. Nintendo World Report's Daan Koopman also felt that outside of a few interactions, most of the game's story was very forgettable, with Whitehead believing that the lack of an in-depth story was a missed opportunity for the game due to its large character roster.

IGN's Meghan Sullivan found the game's orb system to be a negative, as orbs were difficult to come by and were needed for numerous in-game functions. Other critics similarly responded negatively to the arbitrary play time constraint that the stamina limit created, as well as the fact that replenishing it with orbs often pushes players to make extra purchases with real world currency. Criticism of the stamina restrictions at launch were later met by an increase in the stamina cap as well as a reduction in the stamina spent to complete missions. The Verge noted that this response to player feedback helped to contribute to the game's overall popularity.

The introduction of the Feh Pass in 2020 resulted in strong negative reactions from players, who criticized its price point and the number of exclusive quality of life features locked behind a paywall.

=== Revenue ===
During the first day of release, Nintendo reported that the game generated more than $2.9 million. The game also ranked in third place in Japan when the game launched, also making shares skyrocket for the company. In its first year, Fire Emblem Heroes generated almost $300 million USD in revenue. By December 2017, the game had grossed $240 million from 12 million paid players. In February 2018, it was reported that Heroes had made roughly $295 million in its first year. By September 2018, the game had reached 14.1 million downloads and grossed $437 million. During the year, the game accounted for 66% of Nintendo's overall mobile game revenue. By February 2019, the game had grossed $500 million worldwide, with Japan accounting for 56% (about $280 million) of its revenue. As of January 2020, the game has grossed $656 million worldwide, making it Nintendo's highest-grossing mobile game. In 2022, Fire Emblem Heroes became Nintendo's first mobile game to cross $1 billion in earnings despite being Nintendo's fourth-most downloaded title. Spending was particularly high in Japan, which provided over half of the game's revenue. These figures also made the game the most profitable Fire Emblem series game of all time. By February 2025, the game had grossed more than $1.3 billion USD.

Commentators have noted that despite having an install base smaller than Super Mario Run, Fire Emblem Heroes is more financially lucrative for Nintendo. The Verge noted this was due both to being a "superior game" to Super Mario Run, and Tatsumi Kimishima, in a Siliconera article, said that Heroes targets a somewhat older audience willing and capable of paying microtransactions for more content. Game Developer stated that the game's unique quirks in regards to its gacha system make bigger spending in one go more lucrative for obtaining more characters, which encourages spending and was a big success for the game.

=== Accolades ===
The game won the award for "Best Game of 2017" in Google Play Japan, and for "Best Mobile Game" in Destructoid's Game of the Year Awards 2017, and it also won the People's Choice Award for the same category in IGN's Best of 2017 Awards. Polygon ranked it 20th on their list of the 50 best games of 2017.

Year	Award	Category	Result	Ref.
2017	Golden Joystick Awards	Handheld/Mobile Game of the Year	Nominated	
2017	The Game Awards 2017	Best Mobile Game	Nominated	
2018	New York Game Awards 2018	A-Train Award for Best Mobile Game	Nominated	
2018	21st Annual D.I.C.E. Awards	Mobile Game of the Year	Won	
2018	National Academy of Video Game Trade Reviewers Awards	Game, Strategy	Nominated	
2018	SXSW Gaming Awards	Mobile Game of the Year	Won	
2018	2018 Teen Choice Awards	Choice Videogame	Nominated	

=== In other media ===
Shortly following the game's release, an event was held in networking app Miitomo that let players unlock clothing cosmetic items based on Fire Emblem Heroes' characters. In 2019, the game would collaborate with Dragalia Lost, resulting in characters from the game, including Alfonse and Veronica, being included in Dragalia Lost as playable characters.

2023's Fire Emblem Engage would take heavily from Heroes. The weapons used by Alfonse, Sharena, and Anna can be unlocked in-game via a code taken from Heroes, and the game features a gacha system similar to Heroes' own. Additionally, many returning characters in Engage are characters who have won the Choose Your Heroes popularity poll in the past, and many take from their Heroes appearances; for example, the character Lucina uses bows as her main weapon in Engage, which she only uses in Heroes. Many voice actors introduced in Heroes also reprise their roles in Engage. Veronica would also be added to Engage as an unlockable DLC character, and would later be added as a playable character to the 2025 social deduction game Fire Emblem Shadows.
