= UWM Post =

Student newspaper of the University of Wisconsin–Milwaukee

- Type: Student newspaper
- Format: Tabloid (formerly, now online only)
- Owner: UWM Post Inc.
- Founded: 1915; 111 years ago
- Headquarters: Milwaukee, Wisconsin USA
- Price: Free
- Website: uwmpost.com

The UWM Post is a student newspaper independently run by the students of the University of Wisconsin–Milwaukee. Published weekly in print from 1915 to 2012, it became independently operated in 1956. The newspaper published a new issue every Monday during the fall and spring semesters and was distributed both on campus and in the Greater Milwaukee metropolitan area.

Once the largest independent college weekly in Wisconsin, the newspaper ended its print run in 2012, though it is published online.

== History ==
The UWM Post was formally founded with that title in 1956 after the merger of the Wisconsin State College - Milwaukee and UW Extension Milwaukee division merged that year to form the University of Wisconsin Milwaukee. The paper is ultimately descended from the publications of both schools and had frequently cited 1915 and 1888 as its founding year. It was the University of Wisconsin–Milwaukee's unofficial campus news outlet and served as the primary source of student news, collegiate athletics and on- and off-campus events and issues for students and alumni. From the 1980s to the early 2000s, it competed with other campus papers, including the UWM Times, the Sun and the Leader.

An independent student-run news outlet, the UWM Post was governed by a five-member Board of Directors elected by the staff, with the editor in chief serving as chair. The Board was responsible for financial solvency of the newspaper, employment and management decisions, and daily operations.

The UWM Post during its period of dominance served as the primary on-campus opportunity for students in journalism, graphic design, marketing and business administration. In addition, the paper was an active member of the community through sponsoring educational and social events and supporting non-profit organizations.

The UWM Post maintained national affiliations with UWIRE, the Associated Collegiate Press, the Student Press Law Center and the Society for Professional Journalists. It has won awards from the American Scholastic Press Association, Wisconsin Newspaper Association, Society for Professional Journalists and a Best of Show award from the Associated Collegiate Press. The UWM Post’s coverage on events and issues was regularly cited in student and other publications.

At its peak, the Post produced Monday and Thursday editions with press runs of 10,000 to 15,000 copies each Monday and Thursday during the fall and spring semesters, plus summer issues. Seventy-five percent of the newspapers were distributed on the UWM campus, with the remaining newspapers disseminated to locations throughout the East Side, Riverwest, downtown, Bay View and north side neighborhoods.

== Cessation of print format (2012) ==
The UWM Post printed its last print issue in November 2012. Because of lack of steady revenue, the Post cut its paper edition and ended salaries. An online-exclusive edition was launched in spring 2013.

== Litigation ==
The UWM Post has been party to numerous lawsuits over the years. These included at least two lawsuits brought by former staff against the paper over its control and resources.

Other legal actions saw the Post as plaintiff seeking to influence public policy. In 1991, the Post was lead plaintiff in an ACLU-supported action against the University of Wisconsin Regents which resulted in the declaration that the university's campus speech codes were unconstitutional.

On November 11, 2009, the UWM Post and former editor in chief Jonathan Anderson filed a lawsuit against the University of Wisconsin-Milwaukee claiming the university violated Wisconsin's public records law by redacting records the UWM Post requested regarding the university's Union Policy Board. The university argued it redacted the records pursuant to the Family Educational Rights and Privacy Act (FERPA), a federal student privacy law, because students were members of the board. The newspaper contended that the university was over-complying with FERPA and misinterpreting the law's intent. The dispute was settled out of court, with the university agreeing to release all the records requested. Kevin Lessmiller won the 2010 Wisconsin Newspaper Association's Freedom of Information Award for his coverage of the lawsuit.

== See also ==
- List of college newspapers
