= Perrin Kaplan =

American businesswoman

- Occupations: Founder, Zebra Partners, LLC; Former Vice President, Marketing & Corporate Affairs for Nintendo of America, Inc.

Perrin Kaplan is the former vice president of Marketing and Corporate Affairs for Nintendo of America Inc. In 2009, Kaplan joined former Nintendo colleagues Beth Llewelyn and Kelli Koenig Horner to form Zebra Partners, a Marketing and PR firm, based in Seattle.

Before leaving Nintendo, Perrin Kaplan oversaw public relations, government affairs, investor relations and internal communications for the Western Hemisphere and played a key role in global coordination inside the Nintendo corporation. She was also a leader in the company's top marketing team.

Kaplan joined Nintendo as corporate communications manager in 1992. In 1996, she became Director of Corporate Affairs, expanded her responsibilities and built the department that represents the company today.

Before joining Nintendo, Kaplan was vice president of The Rockey Company, a Seattle-based public relations and public affairs firm. Prior to that, she worked as a member of the Washington State Department of Ecology's public affairs team. Kaplan also worked on the Washington State Senate communications staff and was a reporter/editor for KING Broadcasting, Seattle's NBC affiliate.

A Seattle native, Kaplan holds a Bachelor of Arts degree in communications and political science from the University of Washington.

On October 11, 2007, Kaplan announced that she would retire from the company at the end of the year officially leaving in December 2007.

She has since been replaced by Denise Kaigler who joined Nintendo of America's Bay Side Office Team as vice president of Marketing and Corporate Affairs

Feeling talkative and confident from Nintendo of Japan's success with the Wii, Kaplan was reported as saying, "Gamers Were Bored Before Wii..."

She appeared on a panel at the Penny Arcade Expo in 2008 on "Sex, Violence, and Video Games". In her introduction, she stated that after she left Nintendo, she traveled the world and decided to start up her own company. She is also the founder of Saving Great Animals, a dog rescue non-profit.
