= Fire Emblem Shadows =

2025 video game

- Key artwork, featuring Zasha (left), Kurt (middle), and Estel (right)
- Developer: Intelligent Systems (Note: Service infrastructure and development cooperation by DeNA)
- Publisher: Nintendo
- Directors: Kouhei Maeda; Junichi Iida
- Producers: Masahiro Higuchi; Kouhei Maeda; Tetsuya Iguchi; Yuki Babazono
- Programmers: Kei Matsubara; Tetsuro Matsuzaki
- Artist: Daisuke Yasumatsu
- Writers: Kouhei Maeda; Satoko Kurihara; Kouta Nakamura; Azumi Sakurada
- Composer: Shoh Murakami
- Series: Fire Emblem
- Platforms: Android, iOS
- Release: September 25, 2025
- Genres: Strategy, social deduction
- Mode: Multiplayer

Fire Emblem Shadows (Note: Japanese: ファイアーエムブレム シャドウズ, Hepburn: Faiā Emuburemu Shadows) is a 2025 social deduction strategy video game developed by Intelligent Systems and published by Nintendo for Android and iOS. It is the second mobile spin-off of the Fire Emblem series following Fire Emblem Heroes (2017). Unlike Heroes, the game forgoes the series' traditional tactical role-playing gameplay in favor of multiplayer social deduction.

Players engage in combat where one of their number is secretly a traitor who can sabotage others. After combat's completion, players vote on who they think is the traitor and subsequently must fight the traitor afterwards. The game features an in-game story split in two halves; the light half focuses on the journeys of heroes such as Kurt, a royal who is forced to flee her home country after it is attacked by the Goddess of Shadows, Fenris, while the dark half provides additional context to the actions of involved characters, including a focus on servants of both Fenris and the Light Goddess Naga as they engage in combat with each other.

The game was announced and released on September 25, 2025. The game received negative reviews from critics, who felt the gameplay was simple and that its social deduction gameplay was lacking in depth.

== Gameplay and plot ==
=== Gameplay ===
A first in the series, Shadows features real time strategy gameplay with social deduction elements. In online multiplayer battles, three players work together against a series of enemies, with one player secretly serving the Goddess of Shadows, Fenris; this player can attack and sabotage their allies. Combat is automatic, with characters moving on their own; players can control when they use magic and healing abilities. Players can adjust the skills and weapons they use outside of combat. Each game is split into two rounds; in the first, losing is impossible, and players may do whatever they wish to convince or demonstrate to the others that they are not the traitor. After combat, players must vote on who they believe is the Fenris-aligned player; if players associated with the light guess correctly, they receive additional revivals, allowing a player's character to heal themselves if they are defeated. Once the traitor is revealed, they transform into an animalistic version of themselves based on a particular trait present on their body. Players then must fight the traitor in combat during the second round; whichever side prevails in combat wins the game.

=== Plot ===
An image of combat in Fire Emblem Shadows, with the player controlling Kurt preparing to use a spell to attack enemies

The game is split into parallel light and shadow stories that are told in short, visual novel-style chapters and grouped into episodes known as Books. The player can unlock chapters by playing multiplayer battles.

In the first chapter of the story, Kurt, the prince of the Kingdom of Ast, flees the country after it is invaded by servants of Fenris. Kurt, actually a woman who is hiding her gender due to a lack of male heirs, and her retainers and allies, seek to flee to the neighboring kingdom of Holtz, where Kurt's fiancee, Rose, will grant them safety. Servants of Fenris, Hati and Skoll, attack them throughout the journey, with Skoll attempting to kill Kurt in what she believes to be a nightmare. The group realizes there is a traitor feeding information to them, revealed to be a member of Kurt's allies, Gotthold, who became a servant to save Kurt's life from Skoll. Gotthold lets himself die rather than harm Kurt, and the group subsequently makes it to Holtz. Servants of Naga, Sai and Shea, begin to combat the forces of Fenris, recruiting an amnesiac woman named Lyn.

The second chapter of the story focuses on the character Joachim, a boy descended from Fenris who lives in a village with disciples of Naga. Joachim's village is destroyed by servants of Fenris, and Hati and Skoll attempt to recruit him. Erma and Yuni, two servants of Naga, reunite Joachim with his friends, with Yuni intending to kill the servant of Fenris among them. Joachim is suspected of being the traitor, though it is revealed Joachim's friend Estel is the true traitor, having joined with Fenris to save Joachim's life. Joachim kills Estel, who lets herself die by his hand. Kurt, through her royal blood, receives warning that one day, she and Joachim will end up in conflict. Meanwhile, Sai, Shea, and Lyn end up in conflict with Hati and Skoll.

The third chapter is set in the kingdom of Notia, which is home to a labyrinth filled with monsters. Though given a holy axe by Naga to combat the threat, the royalty is destroyed and are unable to stop the monsters. A sole survivor of the royalty, Rusty, prepares to enter the labyrinth and claim the axe as his own. Ananke, a woman who serves Fenris, is enlisted by Skoll to kill Rusty as he claims the axe so the new royalty can claim it as their own. Rusty ends up claiming the axe, and he reveals the axe allows for control over the labyrinth's monsters. He uses the axe to stop agents of the new royalty, as well as kill Ananke. Rusty prepares to head to Saule to obtain aid for a revolution to overthrow the new royalty. Sai, Shea, Hati, and Skoll observe the proceedings, with Hati and Skoll stating that they will to continue to attempt to recruit Rusty to their cause.

== Release and reception ==
=== Release ===
Fire Emblem Shadows was revealed and immediately released on September 25, 2025 in over 70 countries on multiple devices, including iOS and Android. Barring licensed releases, it was the first mobile game to be released by Nintendo in six years since the 2019 release of Mario Kart Tour. It is the second Fire Emblem game released on mobile, following the 2017 release of Fire Emblem Heroes. Shadows was developed by Intelligent Systems in conjunction with the company DeNA.

The game uses a free to play model. Unlike Heroes, a gacha game, Shadows uses microtransactions, including a season pass, which allowed players to unlock returning character Lyn until October 28. Following the release of Shadows, the game's incarnation of Lyn was added to Heroes, which caused the latter game to experience a surge in revenue. Returning character Corrin was added as the second season pass's character in late October 2025. Subsequent season pass characters were released on a monthly schedule, with each featuring returning characters from throughout the series, who were either main characters or highly popular characters among Fire Emblem fans. Following the release of Fire Emblem: Fortune's Weave in 2026, the "Royal Sword" weapon available in Shadows was gifted to players of Fortune's Weave as part of a post-launch patch.

=== Critical reception ===
Reception

Aggregate score
Aggregator	Score
Metacritic	37/100

Review scores
Publication	Score
GameSpot	3/10
Nintendo Life	3.8/10
Multiplayer.it	4.5/10

The game received "generally unfavorable" reviews according to review aggregator website Metacritic, achieving a score of 37/100 based on 5 reviews. Metacritic would later rank the game as the second-worst reviewed game of 2025 on the platform, only being ahead of MindsEye. Madsen, writing for Inverse, criticized the game as being "too simple", feeling it would not be very appealing to players after a few rounds of gameplay. Polygon's Giovanni Colantonio also felt the gameplay lacked depth, particularly in terms of the social elements of the game, additionally criticizing the microtransactions in the game, as players who bought stronger gear could simply overwhelm other players even if they do not engage with the social elements. The game was noted by critics as having a gameplay style resembling the 2018 social deduction game Among Us.

GameSpot's Cameron Koch felt the game went by too quickly for the social deduction aspects to be incorporated effectively, and that microtransactions allowed players to brute force their way into victory regardless of their success in social deduction. Though Koch highlighted the game's character designs and story, feeling that they were effective elements, he noted the fact that they were locked beyond gameplay that he felt was boring. Nintendo Life's PJ O'Reilly also found that the gameplay was boring, and that the story was rigid and basic in addition to the overly slow gameplay pace. Lorenzo Kobe Fazio, writing for Multiplayer.it, criticized the lack of a strong story and the fast-paced gameplay, which he felt resulted in a lack of strong interest for the former and the social deduction gameplay being considerably less effective, respectively. He did, however, positively highlight the game's graphics.

=== Revenue ===
In the game's first week, the game made $90,000 USD in revenue, a decrease from previous Fire Emblem mobile game Heroes, which made over $400,000 USD in its first week. Over half of Shadows's revenue hails from Japanese players, with 32% hailing from players in the United States and only 1% hailing from Canada. In its first month, it made $200,000 USD in revenue, with spending for the game peaking one day after its release and steadily declining from there. By the end of its first six months, Shadows grossed $578,000 USD, with monthly player spending declining each month, though a spending boost occurred when a new season pass released each month. Within this same span of time, Heroes grossed $20.6 million USD, with Shadows' gross equally 3% of that total.
