= My Nintendo =

Nintendo loyalty program

- Developer: Nintendo
- Type: Loyalty program
- Launched: NA: March 17, 2016; EU: March 31, 2016
- Status: Active
- Website: nintendo.com

My Nintendo (Note: Japanese: マイニンテンドー, Hepburn: Mai Nintendō) is a loyalty program provided by Nintendo and the successor to Club Nintendo. The system allows players to earn points from using software or purchasing games, which can then be spent on rewards such as digital games or discounts. The program launched worldwide in March 2016, releasing alongside Nintendo's first mobile app, Miitomo.

My Nintendo was originally the name of a registration program provided by Nintendo of America that launched in 2002. It allowed users to register their games and consoles on Nintendo's website using a printed code included with the products. Signing up gave customers access to digital rewards, including screen savers, wallpapers, downloadable tips, and access to the Nintendo NSider forums, Nintendo's official discussion board. Registering specific games (such as Kirby: Canvas Curse) rewarded players with exclusive physical items, although these types of products were not typically offered. This service was replaced by a North American version of Club Nintendo in December 2008.

== Features ==
By clearing various "missions", players earn three different kinds of currency; Gold Points, Platinum Points, and app-centric Platinum Points, which could be exchanged for rewards, including digital game downloads for the Wii U and Nintendo 3DS, discounts on software purchased from the Nintendo eShop or the official Nintendo online store, and other digital items such as downloadable themes for the Nintendo 3DS. Gold Points are earned by purchasing software (automatically added to account if digital purchase, physical purchase only redeemable within set time from games release) while Platinum Points are earned by performing actions such as linking with social media or signing into the Nintendo eShop or (formerly) Miiverse weekly. App-centric Platinum Points are earned by clearing missions within Nintendo's mobile apps, and can either be used to purchase rewards within the app or combined with regular Platinum Points to be spent on the main rewards. On March 6, 2018, the ability to use Gold Points in the Nintendo Switch eShop became available. On September 8, 2020, the first set of physical rewards was available using Platinum Points.

== History ==
In January 2015, Nintendo announced that Club Nintendo would be discontinued in all regions, with announcements for a new loyalty program at a later date. Club Nintendo was discontinued in North America on June 30.

In February 2016, it was announced that its replacement, My Nintendo, would launch the following month in 39 countries, alongside Nintendo's new mobile app Miitomo and the new Nintendo Account system.

On December 1, 2016, My Nintendo added child account support, allowing users under 13 years to use the service with parental or guardian control. Adult user accounts can also add children between the age of 13 and 17 inclusively.

On March 27, 2023, Nintendo discontinued Wii U and 3DS theme, game, and game add-on rewards, coinciding with the closure of the Wii U and 3DS eShops and the 3DS Theme Store.

On February 18, 2025, Nintendo announced that Gold Points would be discontinued on March 24.

== Other ==
My Nintendo was also the name given to a service in North America, which allowed users to register their games online to gain access to exclusive bonuses like screensavers.
