= Miitomo =

Former free-to-use social network app (2016–2018)

- Android app icon
- Developer: Nintendo EPD (Note: Additional work by DeNA)
- Release: Japan; March 17, 2016; U.S.; March 31, 2016
- Final release: 2.4.0 /: January 21, 2018; Discontinued; May 9, 2018
- Engine: Cocos2D-X
- Platform: iOS; Android
- Available in: 12 languages
- List of languages: Arabic; Chinese; English; Dutch; French; German; Italian; Japanese; Korean; Portuguese; Russian; Spanish
- Type: Social networking service
- License: Freemium
- Website: Miitomo.com

Miitomo (Note: Japanese: ミートモ, Hepburn: Mītomo) was a social networking app developed by Nintendo for iOS and Android devices. The app, Nintendo's first, had users make personalized Mii avatars and converse with friends by answering various pre-made questions and sharing their responses. Miis could be customized with clothing, purchased within a shop using a virtual currency attainable through minigames or in-app purchases. Users could also take custom photographs of their Miis, called Miifotos, and post them online.

Miitomo began production around 2014 by Ryutaro Takahashi and Yoshio Sakamoto, both key developers on Tomodachi Life (2013), amid an internal company push to develop smartphone apps. They experimented with conceptualizing Mii characters in different contexts beyond traditional video games, and settled on an interpersonal communication service. Nintendo partnered with DeNA to build the app's backend infrastructure and determine appropriate price-points for the title's in-app purchases.

Miitomo was released in March 2016 for iOS and two months later for Android, launching alongside the My Nintendo service. Its implementation of microtransactions, deemed non-intrusive, and Miifotos mechanic were praised by critics, while opinions on its presentation and social features were more mixed. Miitomo was a commercial success on launch, amassing over ten million downloads worldwide a month after release. Nintendo discontinued Miitomo on May 9, 2018, citing the app's by then dwindling userbase and a desire to allocate resources on other smartphone endeavors.

== Features ==
A Mii greeting the player. Users could visit their own Miis' rooms to answer questions and send messages.

Miitomo served as a free-to-play social networking application for mobile devices where users created Miis and communicated with friends by answering and sharing preset questions concerning a variety of topics. Examples of such questions include "What did you do over the weekend?", "What was the most emotional thing that happened to you lately?", and "If you became a celebrity, what would you want to be famous for?"

Miis are customizable avatars whose facial features are adjusted to create caricatures of real-world people or fictional characters, and previously appeared on the Wii, Wii U, and Nintendo 3DS consoles. Such features include face shapes, head hair, facial hair, eyes, noses, mouths, and glasses. Users could generate Miis in Miitomo through a number of avenues. These included making Miis from scratch, automatically generating one using a selfie, transferring an existing avatar from the user's My Nintendo account, or inputting a QR code from a Wii U or Nintendo 3DS. The Miis are then manually assigned a synthesized voice and personality, akin to the Mii-creation mechanics in Tomodachi Life (2013), and placed inside a small room.

Users could add friends in Miitomo by communicating locally with their friends' devices or by linking the app to their Facebook or Twitter accounts. Users could answer questions by tapping on their Mii themselves, while tapping a Mii's thought bubble displays responses from other friends. Users could visit, or be visited by, their friends and answer specific questions that would only be shared with a specific friend. Users could react to their friends' responses by "liking" or "commenting" on their messages. Pictures of a user's Mii, known as Miifotos, could be taken, utilizing custom backdrops, text, or stickers, and shared between friends or online via Twitter, Facebook, Line, and Instagram.

Performing various actions in the app, such as answering questions and completing daily missions, would earn virtual coins, which could also be obtained through in-app purchases. These coins could be spent in a shop to purchase clothing items for customizing the user's Mii. Exclusive clothing could be obtained through the pachinko-style Miitomo Drop minigame, which could be played by either spending coins or using "game tickets" earned through play. The app was tied into My Nintendo's rewards scheme, with users able to earn Platinum Points by clearing objectives such as getting a certain number of likes from friends or linking their social media accounts. Platinum Points could then be exchanged for special items, additional game tickets, or miscellaneous My Nintendo rewards.

== Development and release ==
Miitomo was developed by Nintendo EPD, including several key production members of Tomodachi Life under the supervision of Ryutaro Takahashi and Yoshio Sakamoto. Miitomo's development team consisted of 50 employees in total—30 core developers and 20 additional backend and promotional staff. The title's conceptualization occurred around 2014 amid an internal company push to develop smartphone games, in light of increasing customer demand. Takahashi and Sakamoto discussed potential applications for Mii characters beyond traditional video games. He became convinced that the Miis were versatile enough to have a place in a communication-centered smartphone service; the Miitomo team worked towards developing a platform geared to as large a demographic as possible. Nintendo of America president Reggie Fils-Aimé stated in an interview that Miitomo intentionally prioritizes communication with solely friends to maintain a pleasant user experience. He also viewed Miitomo as a means for customers to intimately re-engage with Nintendo, particularly through the app's My Nintendo integration.

Nintendo partnered with DeNA due to their experience in mobile platforms; DeNA were responsible for the service's infrastructure and the inclusion of My Nintendo services. While Miitomo employs a freemium monetization model with the inclusion of in-app purchases, the team wanted to ensure Miitomo could be enjoyed without spending money. Sakamoto consulted with DeNA to determine appropriate price-points for specific features. The team intended to continue updating the app further with additional content beyond launch. Sakamoto stated that one of the most intensive aspects of development was finding ways to entice users to open the app every day by releasing a steady stream of new features. He expressed hope that Miitomo could evolve into a communication platform whose content is spearheaded by the users themselves.

=== Release ===
Miitomo was initially announced on October 25, 2015 as Nintendo's first-ever smartphone app. It was the first of five Nintendo-developed apps due to release before the end of March 2017. Initially projected to release within 2015, Miitomo's global launch was delayed to March 2016. Reception to the initial announcement and delay was unfavorable among Nintendo's investors, with the company's share value dropping 9%. This was credited to disappointment from analysts who expected Nintendo's first mobile app to be connected with its flagship series The Legend of Zelda or Mario. Miitomo debuted in Nintendo's home market of Japan on March 17, 2016, and was later released in Western territories on March 31, 2016, for iOS and Android mobile devices. By the end of the month, it became available in all sixteen countries that were eligible for a pre-registration period attached to My Nintendo. (Note: Australia, Austria, Belgium, Canada, France, Germany, Republic of Ireland, Italy, Japan, Luxembourg, Netherlands, New Zealand, Russia, Spain, United Kingdom, and United States) Nintendo announced plans to update it further beyond the launch period.

The app was released alongside the My Nintendo service in supported countries. An update in November 2016 added five new features, enabling users to send messages to friends, customize their rooms, share their outfits with the world in "Style Central", publicly answer questions in "Answer Central", and allow for the creation of "Sidekick" Mii characters, which have their own rooms. Along with the major update, Miitomo launched in forty additional countries on the same day without any official announcement. (Note: Argentina, Aruba, Bahamas, Barbados, Belarus, Bolivia, Botswana, Chile, Colombia, Denmark, Dominican Republic, Ecuador, El Salvador, Finland, Ghana, Guatemala, Honduras, India, Madagascar, Malta, Mauritius, Republic of Moldova, Namibia, Nicaragua, Norway, Panama, Papua New Guinea, Paraguay, Peru, Philippines, Portugal, Rwanda, Seychelles, Singapore, Suriname, Sweden, Trinidad and Tobago, Uganda, Zambia, and Zimbabwe)

==== Shutdown ====
In January 2018, Nintendo announced that Miitomo would be discontinued, its servers being shut down on May 9, 2018. They cited the app's dwindling userbase and a desire to re-allocate resources on other smartphone-based endeavors as reasoning for the closure. Nintendo stated on April 30 that a browser-based Mii Maker tool would be released in late May, which could be used to transfer and save Mii characters created within Miitomo.

== Reception ==
=== Critical response ===
Reception

Aggregate score
Aggregator	Score
Metacritic	(iOS) 72/100 (Note: Based on 8 reviews)

Review scores
Publication	Score
Pocket Gamer	3.5/5
USgamer	4/5
Nintendojo	B
PCMag	4/5
Cubed3	7/10
UWM Post	6.5/10

Miitomo garnered "mixed or average reviews" according to the review aggregator website Metacritic.

Miitomo's implementation of in-app purchases was commended as non-intrusive and largely secondary to the core gameplay experience. Critics appreciated that virtual currency and cosmetics could be accumulated through other means, (Note: Attributed to multiple sources:) though Jack Fennimore of The UWM Post criticized the Miitomo Drop minigame as mechanically frustrating and too reliant on luck. Cassidee Moser of Shacknews had negative opinions on the in-app purchases, calling Miitomo a "hollow microtransaction generator" lacking in innovation, a quality she felt was uncharacteristic for a Nintendo product.

The app's presentation was met with mixed responses. Cubed3 writer Jorge Ba-oh commended Miitomo's lack of pop-up advertisements, calling it overall a "solid start" for DeNA and Nintendo. Nintendojo's Robert Marrujo appreciated Miitomo's simple user interface, while Sam Byford of The Verge critiqued long load times and consistent graphical glitches. Fennimore critiqued Miitomo's gameplay as lackluster and too dependent on the commitment of the user's friends to remain interesting. He lauded Miifotos as a mechanic he wished was the app's core focus. Clio Chang of The New Republic attributed Miitomo's early success among users to the versatility of Miifotos, and, echoing Fennimore's sentiment, personally found Miitomo's communication aspects auxiliary to them. Brian Feldman of New York magazine described the app as "a goofier version of The Sims," while Quartz author Mike Murphy compared its question-answering premise to a game of Mad Libs.

Opinions towards Miitomo's dedicated social features were also lukewarm. Fennimore thought creating a friends list was a simpler process compared to previous Nintendo products, while Feldman conversely opined that adding friends was cumbersome. Feldman was surprised by the lack of a profanity filter, and presumed this was due to what he felt was the convoluted nature of attaining friends. Marrujo felt that the app could lack significant appeal for users who did not already have friends to communicate with, calling it "a social experience more than a true game". Stuart Dredge of The Guardian felt Miitomo would be most enjoyable among large friend groups, particularly those consisting of devoted Nintendo fans, while Jordan Minor of PCMag felt it remained engaging even when playing alone by way of its charming atmosphere. Damien McFarren of Nintendo Life found it unique and more personable than its social network competitors, but predicted that most customers would abandon it once its novelty wore off. He neglected to score Miitomo on the grounds that "it simply isn't a game in the strictest sense of the word - giving it a score would be like reviewing Twitter or Facebook". Writing for Digital Trends, Mike Epstein remarked that Miitomo had little inherent utility in everyday life. In comparing its features to those of Snapchat, he wrote that the game's focus on being simply "a fun product" was the result of "a fundamental misunderstanding of what draws phone users to apps."

==== Analysis ====
In a study centering on virtual self-expression conducted by Anna Kasunic and Geoff Kaufman for the Association for Computing Machinery (ACM), it was found that users were as likely to present themselves authentically through their Miis as they were to exhibit more fictionalized behaviors, the latter in line with the Proteus effect. Kasunic and Kaufman opined that this aspect of the app could hold significance for future social networking design with regards to incorporating elements of fantasy alongside authenticity.

=== Sales ===
In less than 24 hours after its worldwide launch on March 31, it had three million users globally, and also rose to the top of the U.S. App Store. Miitomo later accumulated 1.6 million downloads within its first four days in the United States. In Japan, Miitomo had one million users within three days of its launch, overtaking the instant messenger Line as the most downloaded free app on the Japanese App Store. In the week after its initial launch, Nintendo's shares grew by eight percent. By April 2016, Miitomo had a user base of over 10 million users with 300 million conversations between friends and 20 million screenshots taken within the app itself.

Later observations conducted by SurveyMonkey found that only a quarter of the people who had downloaded it regularly opened Miitomo by May 2016, using it half as much as Candy Crush Saga and Clash Royale.
