= Social deduction game =

Category of game

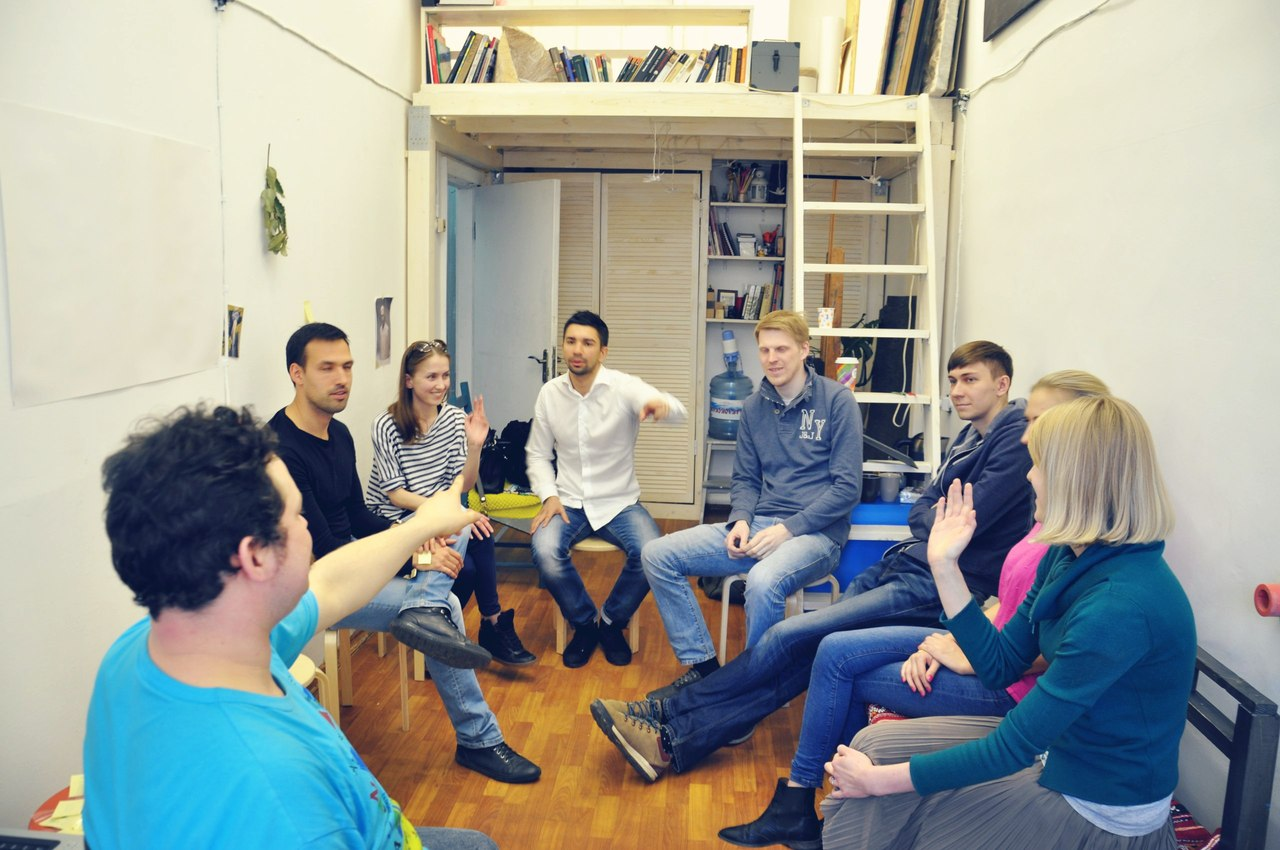
- Players making accusations in a game of "Mafia"
- Genres: Social game

Related games
- Murder mystery game

A social deduction game is a game in which players attempt to uncover each other's hidden role or team allegiance. Commonly, these games are played with teams, with one team being considered "good" and another being "bad", though some games have multiple teams or unique hidden roles for every player. During gameplay, players can use logic and deductive reasoning to try to deduce one another's roles, while other players can bluff to keep players from suspecting them.

Early social deduction games, such as Hoax (1981) and Mafia (1986), were board or card games, and social deduction video games such as Space Station 13 (2003), Town of Salem (2014), and Among Us (2018) began to be created in the 2000s. Both card game and video game social deduction games rose in prominence in the late 2010s.

== Definition ==
A social deduction game is a game, typically a card game, board game, or video game, in which players attempt to uncover each other's hidden role or team allegiance. Commonly, these games are played with teams, with one team being considered "good" and another being "bad". During gameplay, players can use logic and deductive reasoning to try to deduce one another's roles, while other players can bluff to keep players from suspecting them. The genre has also been loosely defined as one where discussion is split between "private" knowledge and discussion and a "public square" phase in which accusations can be made or knowledge can be made public.

Examples of social deduction games include Mafia, in which only the mafia know who is mafia and what the mafia players' roles are; Bang!, in which only the sheriff's role is known to everyone; and Secret Hitler, in which only the fascists know who the fascists are, except for the player who plays as Hitler.

One important element of strategy in some social deduction games is determining how long to stick to one's story in the light of information obtained from other players. A Monte Carlo tree search has been suggested for making decisions in social deduction games. Additionally, the presence of multiple rounds of the game with the same players introduces a strong meta-gaming social component, wherein players must think of not only how to win the current round, but how other players have acted in prior rounds or how they might need to act in future rounds if they are on the other team.

== Early games ==
Social deductions grew out of earlier party games or parlour games such as wink murder, in which a secretly selected player is able to "kill" others by winking at them, while the surviving players try to identify the killer. The premise of the manga series They Were Eleven (1975) was a precursor to social deduction games such as Raging Loop (2015), Among Us (2018) and Gnosia (2019).

One of the earliest social deduction games was Hoax in 1981, a card game without teams in which every player may or may not be lying about which of the seven possible characters they are playing as, and players must deduce the truth or successfully bluff that they are lying to win.

A more prominent early example was Mafia, also known as Werewolf, which began as an academic psychological experiment in Russia before being turned into a popular card game, which used the concept of a "good" and "bad" team, with players on the "good" team trying to determine who the "bad" players were. Mafia and variants thereof continued to grow in popularity over the years, with multiple versions published in the 2000s, such as Ultimate Werewolf. In 2010, Margaret Robinson of Wired said that the game had "infected almost every significant tech event around the world". Matt Casey of Boing Boing claimed in 2014 that every social deduction game since "draws at least some of its inspiration" from Mafia. As social deduction games evolved in the 2000s, they were designed to remove elements of Mafia that were seen as negative, such as long periods where players eliminated earlier could not participate, or the need for a non-playing referee.

== Video games ==
Social deduction games have been adapted to video games numerous times through mods or full games. One instances of such adaptations are custom maps for StarCraft: Brood War including Changeling and The Thing. These custom maps inspired later Warcraft III custom maps including "Mafia", "Werewolf", "Zerg Infestation", "Changeling", and "The Thing". Other notable examples include Garry's Mod "Trouble in Terrorist Town" game mode, Raging Loop (2015), Town of Salem, StarCraft II's Phantom Mode mod, and Gnosia (2019).

Among Us (2018) rose to great popularity in 2020, with the COVID-19 pandemic frequently cited as a reason, as it allowed for socializing despite social distancing. PC Gamer's Wes Fenlon claimed that Among Us brought improvements to the genre over other popular tabletop games that had been inspired by Mafia and over other video games that were more direct copies of the gameplay of the board and card games, by adding active tasks for the players to complete alongside the social deduction.

== Notable games ==
=== Board and card games ===
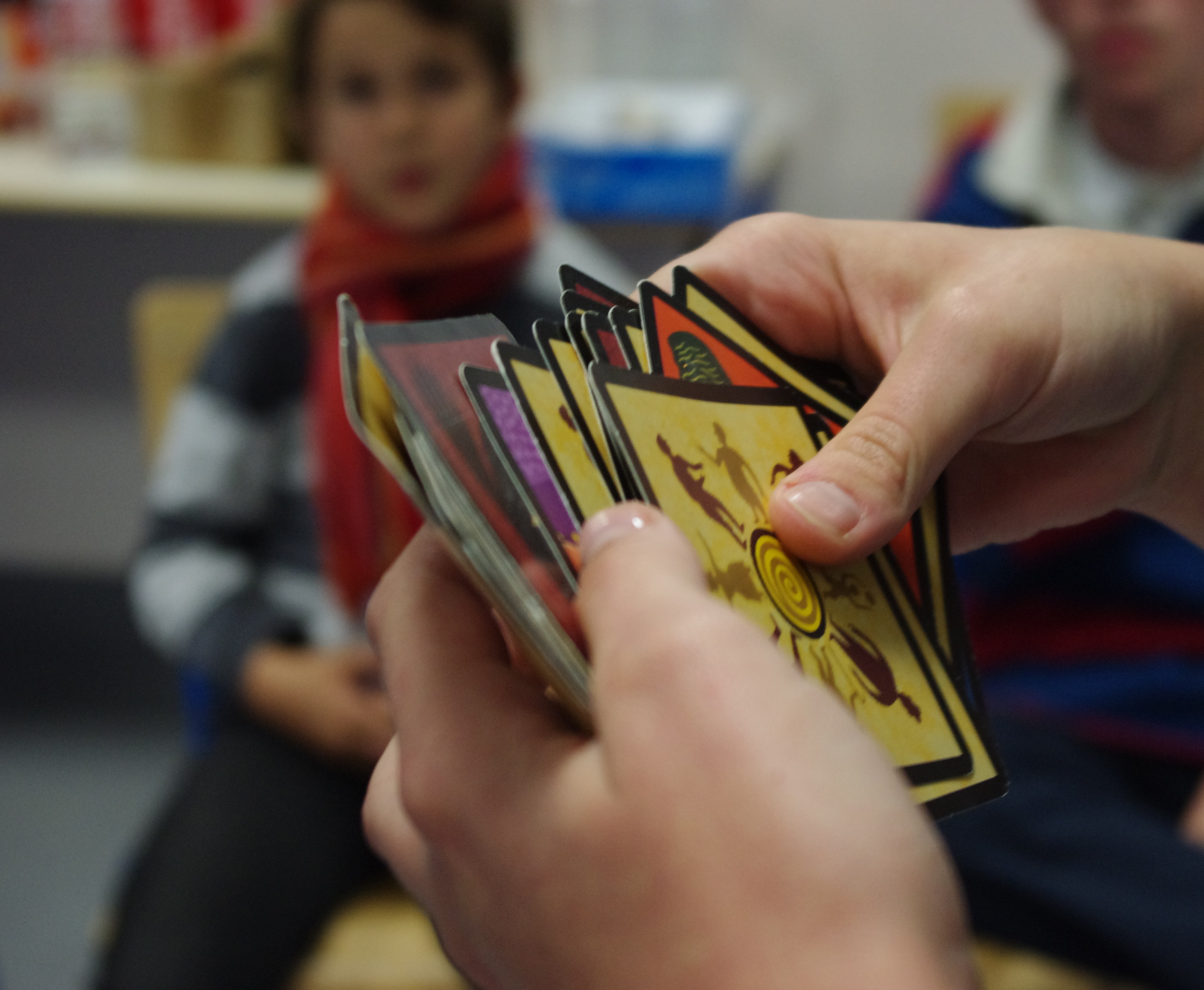
Cards from The Werewolves of Millers Hollow

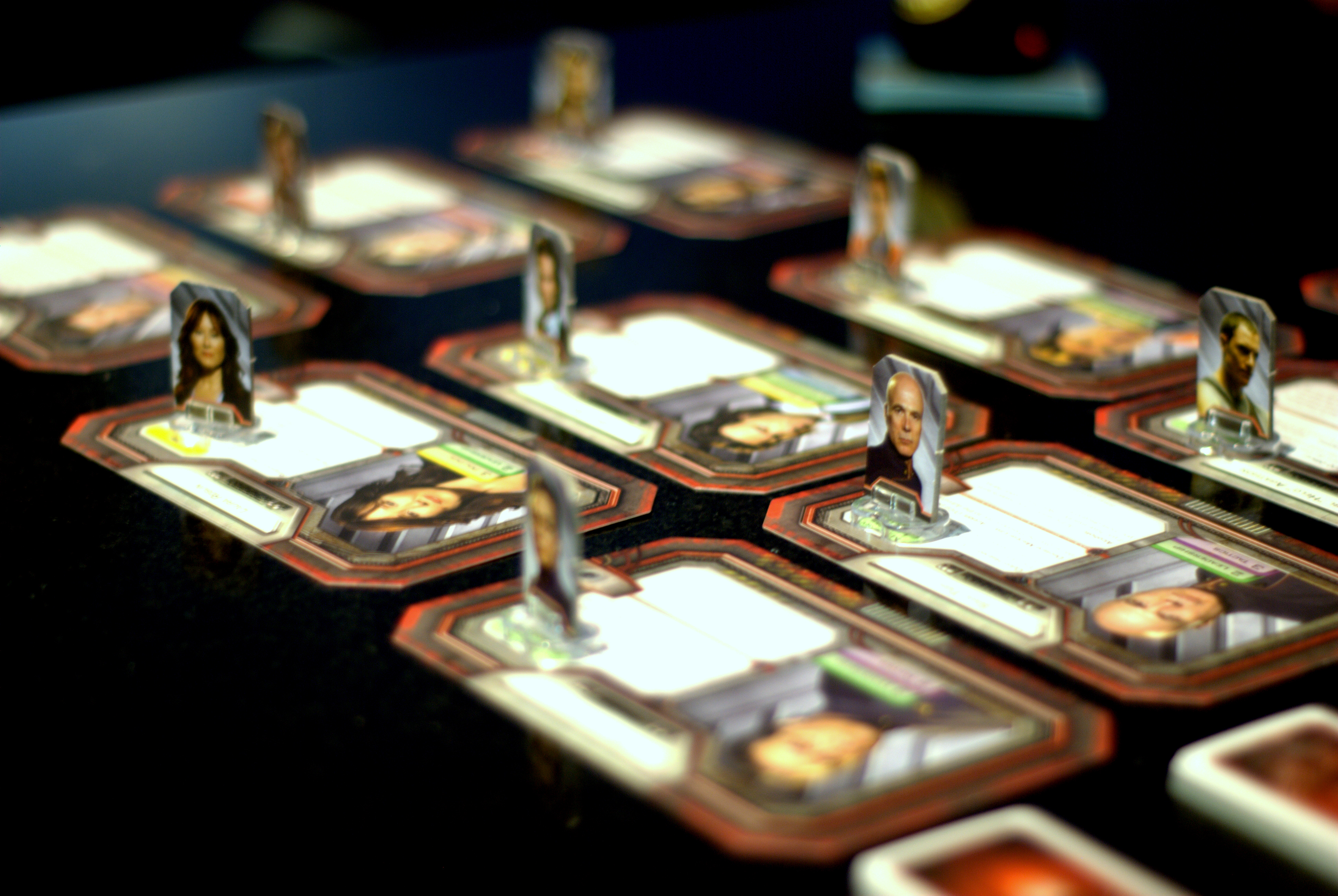
Character Cards from Battlestar Galactica: The Board Game

- Hoax (1981)
- Mafia (1986)
- The Werewolves of Millers Hollow (2001)
- Bang! (2002)
- Battlestar Galactica: The Board Game (2008)
- Ultimate Werewolf (2008)
- The Resistance (2009)
- Coup (2012)
- A Fake Artist Goes to New York (2012)
- Avalon (2012)
- Love Letter (2012)
- Two Rooms and a Boom (2013)
- Deception: Murder in Hong Kong (2014)
- Spyfall (2014)
- Secret Hitler (2016)
- Witch Hunt (2016)
- Crossfire (2017)
- Werewords (2017)
- Dracula's Feast (2017)
- The Chameleon (2017)
- Cheese Thief (2020)
- Ghost Letters (2020)
- Bunker (2020)
- Blood on the Clocktower (2022)
- Feed the Kraken (2022)

=== Video games ===
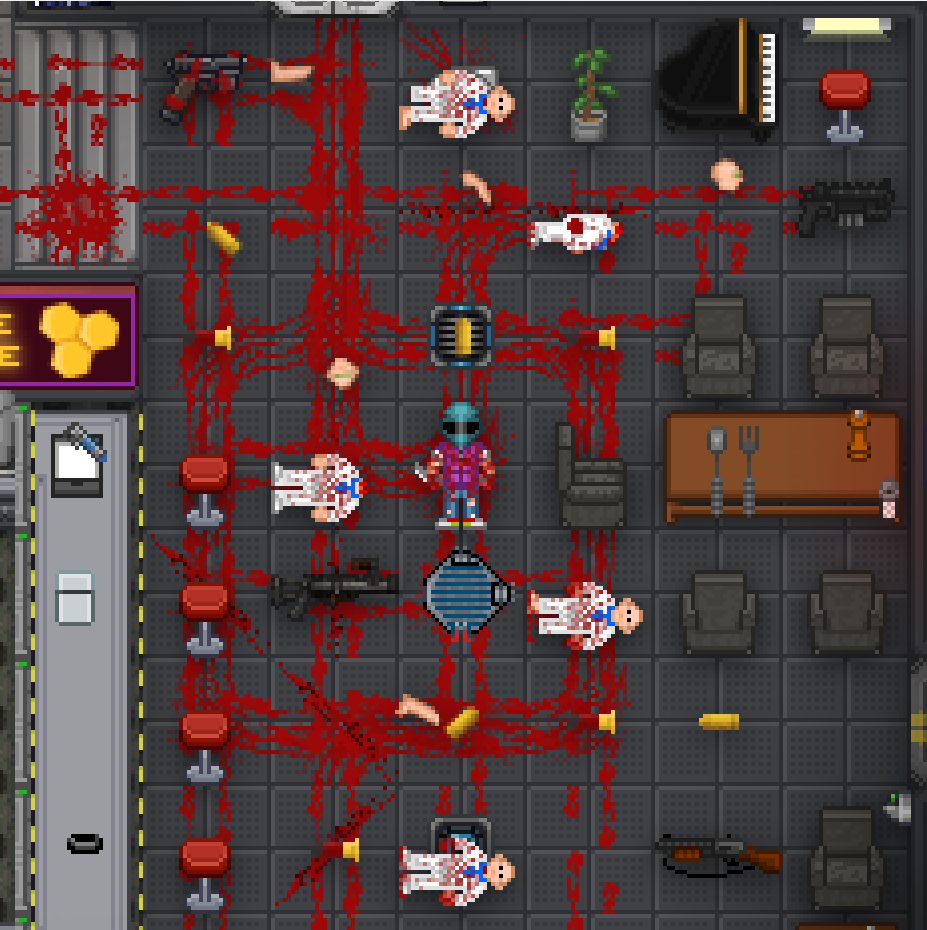
Space Station 13

- Space Station 13 (2003)
- An unnamed multiplayer mode in Mystic Nights (2005)
- Trouble in Terrorist Town (2009), a modification of Garry's Mod (2006)
- EpicMafia (2010), a real-time browser-based implementation of Mafia with over 100 roles and custom setups, shut down in 2021
- Hidden in Plain Sight (2011)
- Mush (2013)
- Town of Salem (2014)
- Murder Mystery 2, a Roblox experience (2014)
- Fakin' It, a minigame included in The Jackbox Party Pack 3 (2016)
- Werewolves Within (2016)
- Mindnight (2017)
- Triple Agent (2017)
- Deceit (2017)
- Triple Agent (2017)
- Throne of Lies (2017)
- Among Us (2018)
- Flicker, a Roblox experience (2018)
- Wolvesville (2018)
- Secret Neighbor, a spin-off of the survival horror stealth game, Hello Neighbor (2018)
- SpyParty (2018)
- Gnosia (2019), a single-player social deduction game
- Project Winter (2019)
- Push the Button, a minigame included in The Jackbox Party Pack 6 (2019)
- Unfortunate Spacemen (2020)
- Goose Goose Duck (2021)
- Suspects: Mystery Mansion (2021)
- Untrusted (2021)
- First Class Trouble (2021)
- Impostors, a game mode in Fortnite (2021)
- Weapons Drawn, a minigame included in The Jackbox Party Pack 8 (2021)
- Dread Hunger (2022)
- Crimesight (2022)
- Among Us VR (2022)
- Traitors, a game mode in Barotrauma (2023)
- Treason (2023)
- Town of Salem 2, a sequel to Town of Salem (2023)
- Ultimafia (2023), a free open-source browser-based successor to EpicMafia supporting Mafia, Werewolf, Secret Hitler and The Resistance
- Hypnotorious, a minigame in The Jackbox Party Pack 10 (2023)
- LOCKDOWN Protocol (2024)
- Dale & Dawson Stationery Supplies (2024)
- Death Note: Killer Within (2024)
- Crypto: The Game (2024)
- Fakin' It All Night Long, a minigame included in The Jackbox Naughty Pack (2024)
- The Snakes, a Roblox experience (2024)
- Carnage, a Roblox experience (2025)
- Mafia [REMADE], a Roblox experience (2025)
- Fire Emblem Shadows (2025)
- Suspectives, a minigame in The Jackbox Party Pack 11 (2025)

=== Television ===
- They Were Eleven (1986), anime TV film based on the 1975 manga, the premise was a precursor to social deduction games.
- De Mol (1998), Belgian reality game show franchise where one contestant is secretly a Mole. The series has been adapted internationally in various countries, including in the Netherlands under the title Wie is de Mol?, in Poland as Agent, and in the United States, Australia and the United Kingdom as The Mole.
- Trapped! (2007), a British children's show where one contestant is secretly a Saboteur
- The Hustler (2021), US quiz show where one contestant is secretly given the answers in advance
- The Traitors, a reality gameshow franchise based on Werewolf/Mafia. The series originally aired in the Netherlands as De Verraders (2021), and local variants have been adapted in more than 30 countries.
- Million Dollar Secret (2025), a Netflix reality show where contestants trying to find who has the million dollar and eliminate contestants. Whoever has the million dollar at the end wins.

== See also ==
- Deduction board game
