= Raging Loop =

2015 visual novel by Kemco

- Developer: Kemco
- Publisher: Kemco: NA/EU: PQube (NS, PS4)
- Directors: Makiko Watanabe; Shuhei Nobuki
- Producer: Masaomi Kurokawa
- Programmer: Yoshihiko Yanagisawa
- Artist: Kageyoshi
- Writer: amphibian
- Composer: NOxNO²
- Platforms: Android, iOS, PlayStation Vita, PlayStation 4, Nintendo Switch, Windows, PlayStation 5, Xbox One, Xbox Series X/S
- Release: December 3, 2015: Android; JP: December 3, 2015; WW: April 22, 2021 iOS; JP: December 3, 2015 PlayStation Vita; JP: January 11, 2017 PlayStation 4; JP: March 1, 2017; EU: October 18, 2019; NA: October 22, 2019 Nintendo Switch; JP: August 3, 2017; EU: October 18, 2019; NA: October 22, 2019 Windows; JP: August 3, 2017; WW: December 5, 2019 PS5, Xbox One, Series X/S; WW: August 30, 2024
- Genre: Visual novel
- Mode: Single-player

Raging Loop (レイジングループ, Reijingu Rūpu; stylized as Rei-Jin-G-Lu-P) is a Japanese visual novel video game developed and published by Kemco in cooperation with Dwango. It was released for Android and iOS on December 3, 2015, and was later ported to PlayStation Vita, PlayStation 4, Nintendo Switch, and Windows in 2017. An English version was released in late 2019 for home consoles and PC, and in 2021 for Android. The PlayStation 5, Xbox One, and Xbox Series X/S versions released in 2024 worldwide.

== Gameplay ==
Raging Loop is an interactive visual novel with a branching plotline, in which the player's choices affect the direction of the story. Certain choices reward the player with keys, which can be used to unlock additional choices and explore more of the story. A Scenario Chart allows the player to return to any given scene or choice. There are four main endings, as well as many bad endings, some of which are optional. While the player has some freedom to explore different paths, the main endings must be played in a linear order due to the locked choices.

Many of the game's choices are at key moments in the Feast of the Yomi-Purge, a Werewolf-like social deduction game in which characters attempt to find the identities of the "wolves" hidden among them.

Clearing the fourth and final ending unlocks "Revelation Mode," which allows players to replay the story with additional content. Revelation Mode includes side characters' internal thoughts, additional narration, and scenes that occur outside the protagonist's perspective, such as the wolves' actions. Along with Revelation Mode, two additional endings and five epilogues become available.

== Plot ==
On a trip from Tokyo, Haruaki Fusaishi crashes his bike into the remote mountain village of Yasumizu, where he befriends college student Chiemi Serizawa. Before he can leave, Yasumizu is enshrouded by mist, and everyone in town must begin the Feast of the Yomi-Purge, an event in which several villagers become "wolves" and must kill one person each night. During the day, the villagers share information and vote to hang someone to eliminate the wolves. According to legend, the wolves are yomibito risen from the dead, and must be purged.

As the Feast continues, Haruaki discovers his ability to loop back in time after death, returning to the day he entered the village and repeating his actions. Unable to escape the loop, Haruaki relies on his memories, in the hopes of learning the truth about the Feast's origin, Yasumizu's secrets, and the truth behind the looping.

In one route, Haruaki bonds with Chiemi and learns her fear of God and the supernatural corruption plaguing Yasumizu. The wolves win the Feast and reveal that the mountain god Shin'nai told them the humans are the true yomibito who need to be saved. Haruaki and Chiemi attempt to run away, but they are unable to escape and Chiemi rots away into the mist.

In another route, Haruaki gains the role of the "snake," allowing him to learn whether someone is a wolf or human each night. His deductions lead the humans to victory over the wolves. During the Feast, he grows close to Rikako Uematsu, a mysterious priestess with the power to heal others by taking in their corruption. Haruaki plans to start a new life with her after the Feast ends, but the remaining villagers are suddenly massacred and Haruaki loops back once again.

In the third route, Haruaki becomes a wolf and learns the inner workings of the Feast. He gets to know his fellow wolf Haru Makishima, a girl who lost her parents in a previous Feast eight years prior. Haru is possessed by a god named Mujina, who is aware of Haruaki's looping ability. By questioning her, Haruaki learns more about Yasumizu's gods. Haruaki ultimately wins the Feast, and a monstrous being appears in the sky. Haruaki is greeted by a sheep who explains to him that he is within someone else's dream, and the dreamer is resetting time to awaken the being. The sheep tells him it has been allowing Haruaki to keep his memories, and sends him back in time to prevent the country's destruction.

Haruaki reconvenes with Chiemi and realizes that she also remembers each time loop. Together, they make numerous attempts to escape the mists and change the events of the Feast, but they remain trapped. Haruaki returns to a number of key points in previous Feasts to speak with other villagers, and begins to understand the truth: the Feast is a man-made game devised by the Miguruma clan, a powerful family in the neighboring village of Fujiyoshi. The Migurumas would ostracize certain people and send them to live in Yasumizu, and fabricated their legends and culture to keep the villagers dedicated to purging yomibito.

Haruaki visits the sheep once more, and asks to be sent back as far as possible. Armed with his knowledge, he returns to Yasumizu and poses as a god, asking the villagers to stop the Feast, and restoring their faith in Mujina. He confronts Rikako, the dreamer responsible for looping time. She reveals that she wanted all the villagers to die in the Feast to revive the Tsuchigumo of Dreams, the being that appeared after Haruaki won the Feast as a wolf. With her plans thwarted, Rikako discovers she can no longer reset time with her death. Lastly, Haruaki confronts the Migurumas and puts an end to their control over Yasumizu.

Haruaki leaves Yasumizu and returns to his normal life, considering the events in Yasumizu to be a dream. However, he is later visited by Chiemi, who asks him to take her out on the bike ride he promised her when they first met. Haruaki agrees, and they set out on their trip.

== Music ==
SweepRecord released an Original Soundtrack CD in late 2018.

== Reception ==
Reception

Aggregate score
Aggregator	Score
Metacritic	79/100

Review scores
Publication	Score
Famitsu	8/8/8/8 (Note: Each of the four reviewers in Famitsu scored the game on a ten point scale)
Nintendo Life	5/10
Digitally Downloaded	4.5/5
Gamereactor	7/10
MeriStation	7.8/10

Raging Loop was well received by critics, according to the review aggregator Metacritic.

== Adaptations ==
- Raging Loop

レイジングループ (Reijingu Rūpu)
- Manga
- Published by: Kodansha
- Imprint: Seikaisha Comics
- Published: April 12, 2019
- Volumes: 1
- Light novel
- Written by: amphibian
- Illustrated by: Kageyoshi
- Published by: Kodansha
- Imprint: Seikaisha Fictions
- Original run: April 15, 2019 – October 15, 2019
- Volumes: 7

A "Perfect Book" (完全読本; lit. Complete Guidebook) was published on March 30, 2018.

=== Manga ===
A 128-page manga anthology was published on April 12, 2019.

=== Novelization ===
A 7-volume novelization by the original author was released from April 15, 2019 to October 15, 2019.

== See also ==
- They Were Eleven
