= Feed the Kraken =

Hidden role board game

- Designers: Maikel Cheney, Dr. Hans Joachim Höh, Tobias Immich
- Publishers: Funtails
- Players: 5–11
- Setup time: approx. 5 minutes
- Playing time: 45–90 minutes
- Skills: Bluffing, deduction, negotiation, social skills

Feed the Kraken is a hidden role deduction board game where players command a ship and attempt to guide it toward various locations. Each player is a member of one of three asymmetric factions (Sailors, Pirates, Cult), each with its own preferred destination.

The game supports 5 to 11 players, with a recommended age of 12+, and sessions last approximately 45 to 90 minutes. It uses mechanisms such as hidden roles, voting, acting, bluffing, variable player powers, and team-based play.

== Gameplay ==
At the beginning of the game, each player gets a secret role card that tells them if they are a Sailor, a Pirate, or a member of the Cult. The Pirates know who their fellow team members are, but the Sailors and Cult members do not. Throughout the game, players attempt to identify allies and pursue their faction's navigation objective. In some cases, members of the Cult may attempt to convert other players to join their faction.

Any faction whose preferred destination is reached wins, but the Cult can also win by sacrificing the Cult Leader to the Kraken.

=== Each round ===
At the start of a round, the current Captain selects a Lieutenant and a Navigator. Players may attempt to persuade the Captain to assign them these positions. If the crew doesn't trust the captain's chosen team, they can initiate a mutiny. Each player (except the captain) secretly places 0 or more of their guns in one fist. The unused guns remain hidden in the other hand. All players hold their closed fist visibly over the table and then open their fists simultaneously and reveal their guns. The mutiny succeeds if the total amount of revealed guns surpass a threshold based on the number of players: if this occurs, the new captain becomes whoever revealed the most guns, and a new round begins from the start.

If a successful mutiny does not occur, the Captain and Lieutenant each draw navigation cards, secretly discarding one card and placing the remaining card face-down. The Navigator then examines the two remaining cards and chooses one to set the ship’s course, discarding the other.

After each navigation at the end of the round, a number of officers depending on the number of players receive temporary off-duty markers. 1 to 3 are given to the navigator, lieutenant, and captain in that order, and an off-duty marker disqualifies the recipient from being chosen as lieutenant or navigator (not captain) in the next round.

== Design ==
The game was designed by Dr. Hans Joachim Höh, Maikel Cheney and Tobias Immich and illustrated by Hendrik Noack and James Churchill.

In an interview, Cheney stated that the designers aimed to develop a game that bridged the playtime gap between shorter hidden role games, such as The Resistance and its variant Avalon, and Battlestar Galactica: The Board Game. He noted that the design sought to ensure that players remained involved throughout the game by limiting periods of inactivity. The designers also introduced a resource-based voting system using limited "gun" tokens, intended to create strategic decision-making around leadership challenges. Höh additionally remarked that the game was structured to reduce player elimination and to conclude with a distinct endgame event.

== Reception ==
Feed the Kraken has received positive reviews from board game critics.

Wyrd Science praised the production quality, basic mechanics and the physical representation of how well each faction is doing by the placement of the ship on the map, which stands out among hidden role games. However, it said the Character Cards were largely superfluous to the game and criticized the mutiny mechanic for being "maybe a little too distributed to really get a proper handle on".

Board Games Land also praised the mechanics, production quality, and physical representation, also liking the Character Cards, but said that the game could be a little complex and players may accidentally break rules early on.
