= Coup (card game) =

Social deception card game

- Manufacturers: Indie Boards & Cards
- Designers: Rikki Tahta; Sacha Alexander; Haig Tahta
- Publishers: La Mame Games
- Publication: 2012; 14 years ago
- Genres: Card game; Party game; Social deduction game
- Players: 2–6
- Playing time: 15 minutes
- Age range: 14+

Coup is a social deduction card game designed by Rikki Tahta and published in 2012 by Indie Boards & Cards and La Mame Games. Players are given two cards and attempt to eliminate the other players by lying and calling their bluffs until only one player remains.

== Gameplay ==
Each player has two face-down character cards, with the remaining cards being placed in a Court Deck in the centre of the play area. Players take turns performing actions, while the other players have the opportunity to challenge or enact a counteraction.

Character	Action	Effect	Counteraction
	Income	Take 1 coin	
	Foreign Aid	Take 2 coins	
	Coup	Pay 7 coins to force a player to lose a character card	
Duke	Tax	Take 3 coins	Block foreign aid
Assassin	Assassinate	Pay 3 coins to force a player to lose a character card	
Ambassador	Exchange	Take two cards and return two cards to Court Deck	Block stealing
Captain	Steal	Take two coins from another player	Block stealing
Contessa			Block assassination

Some actions and counteractions require a player to claim to have a specific character card (which they can do regardless of whether or not they have it). Such claims can be challenged by anyone in the game, regardless of whether they are directly involved in the action. If a player is challenged, they must prove they had the played character card by revealing it from their face-down cards. If they can not or do not want to prove it, they lose the challenge, but if they can, the challenger loses. Whoever loses the challenge immediately loses one of their character cards. When a player loses both their character cards, that player is eliminated. The winner is the remaining player after all others have been eliminated.

== Spin-offs and expansions ==
=== Coup: Reformation ===
In 2014, the game Coup: Reformation was also released by Rikki Tahta and La Mame Games. In this version, each player must declare themself as either Loyalist or Reformist and can target only members of the other faction. Conversion between factions is possible by paying a donation to the Almshouse (treasury). After the other faction has all been eliminated or converted, all remaining players within a faction descend into in-fighting, and the game proceeds as in Coup (2012). Moreover, it introduces the Inquisitor role which can replace the Ambassador, increasing the total number of roles in the game to six. Additionally, by having five cards for each role, the game can accommodate up to 10 players.

==== Coup: Promo Cards Mini Expansion ====
This is a mini expansion introduced to the game. It introduces additional roles: Speculator and Bureaucrat which can replace the Duke as well as Jester and Socialist which can replace the Ambassador.

Character	Action	Effect	Counteraction
	Income	Take 1 coin	
	Foreign Aid	Take 2 coins	
	Coup	Pay 7 coins to force a player to lose a character card. Must Coup, if you have 10 or more coins.	
	Convert	Pay 1 coin to Treasury Reserve to change your allegiance or 2 coins to Treasury Reserve to change another player's allegiance.	
	Embezzle	Take all coins from Treasury Reserve by claiming you don't have Duke, Bureaucrat, or Speculator.	
Duke	Tax	Take 3 coins	Block foreign aid
Assassin	Assassinate	Pay 3 coins to force a player to lose a character card	
Ambassador	Exchange	Take two cards and return two cards to Court Deck	Block stealing
Captain	Steal	Take two coins from another player	Block stealing
Contessa			Block assassination
Inquisitor	Exchange OR Examine	Take a card and return a card to Court Deck OR Examine another player's card and may force them to exchange with a card from Deck	Block stealing
Bureaucrat	Cooperation	Take 3 coins and give one of them to another player	Block foreign aid
Jester	Disorder	Take a card from Court Deck and a card from a player and return a card to Court Deck and the player	Block disorder Block stealing
Speculator	Gamble	Take coins equal to your coins (max 5). If it is successfully challenged, the acquired coins are returned and the first challenger takes all the player's coins.	Block foreign aid
Socialist	Share	Take a coin or a card from all other players. Add a card and choose one card to keep. Then add one random card from Court Deck, shuffle, and return a card to players and Court Deck.	Block stealing

=== Coup: Rebellion Guatemala 1954 ===
A spin-off, Coup: Rebellion Guatemala 1954 (also known as Coup: Rebellion G54), was released in 2014, which included a variable deck of 25 characters. The rules and gameplay are the same as Coup (2012) but with different possible characters, of which five out of the 25 are chosen in each game.

==== Coup: Rebellion G54 – Anarchy ====
An expansion of this called Coup: Rebellion G54 – Anarchy was released in 2016 which added six new roles (Anarchist, Paramilitary, Arms Dealer, Financier, Plantation Owner, and Socialist) as well as the new Social Media general action to the game.

== Reception ==
Upon its release, Coup received generally positive reviews. A review from Wirecutter praised its simplicity, engagement, and replayability. Clayton Ashley from Polygon praised the game's simplicity and bluffing mechanism. IGN listed Coup as one of the "best beginner board games" in 2026 for its quick and simple gameplay. Alex Walker, writing from Kotaku, complemented Coup: Rebellion for its ease of play, quick rounds, and mechanics. However, he also described that the game could "drag on over longer sessions" compared to the original.
