= Blood on the Clocktower =

Social deduction game

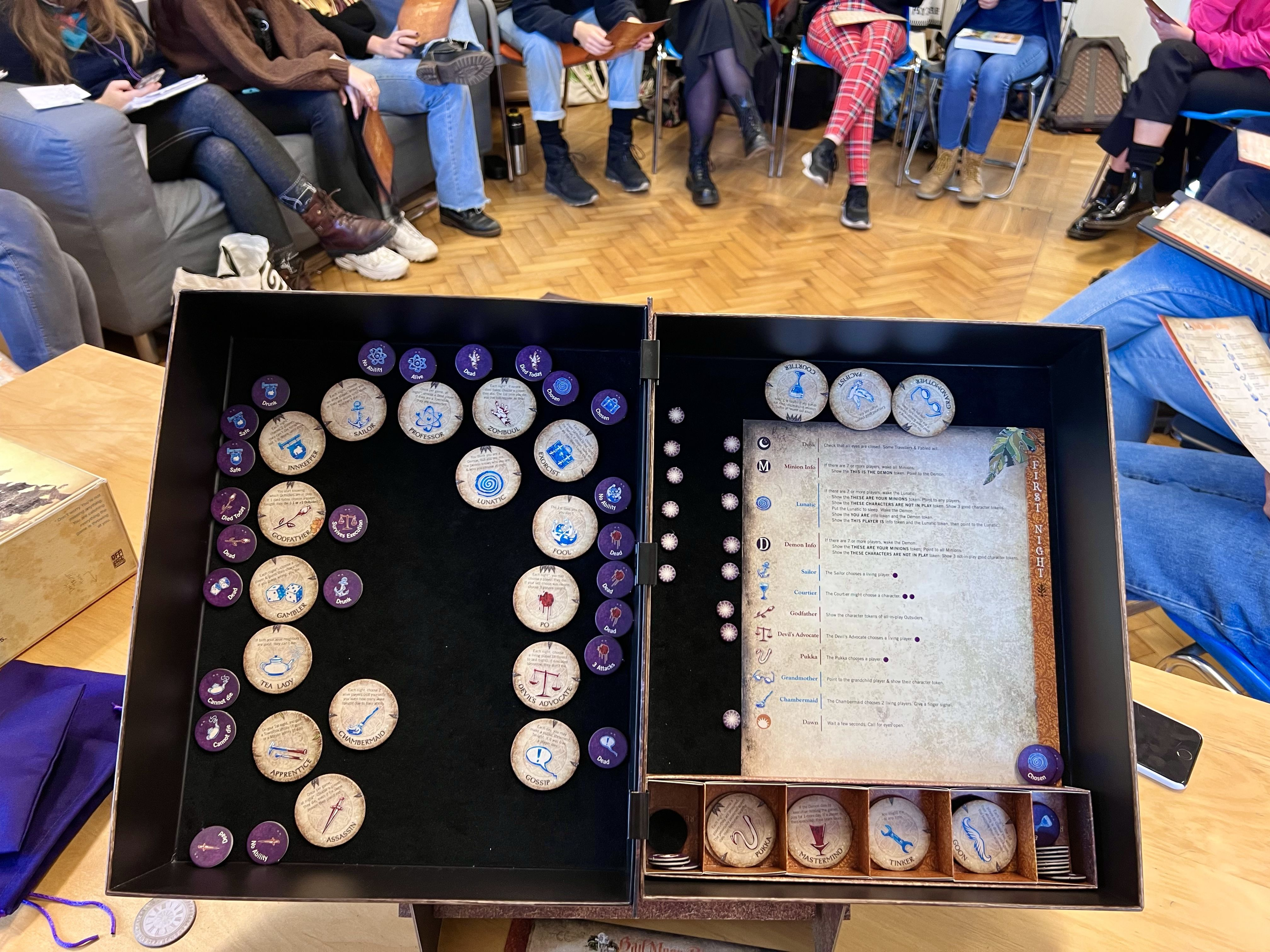
- The game's "grimoire" shows the game state to the storyteller, corresponding to players seated in a circle.
- Designers: Steven Medway
- Illustrators: Lachlan Bastiaen; Micaela Dawn; Aidan Roberts; John Van Fleet; Grace Van Fleet
- Publishers: The Pandemonium Institute
- Publication: 2022; 4 years ago
- Genres: Social deduction game; Party game
- Players: 5–20
- Playing time: 30–120 minutes
- Age range: 14+
- Website: www.bloodontheclocktower.com

Blood on the Clocktower is a social deduction game created by Steven Medway and published by The Pandemonium Institute. The game was released in board game format in 2022, first via Kickstarter. The game can also be played online via a web app and via Discord communities. Gameplay is also live streamed on several Twitch channels, including an official channel by The Pandemonium Institute.

The game shares core mechanics with Mafia, featuring a conflict between two teams of players: an evil team made up of a "demon" and supporting "minions" (the informed minority), and a good team (the uninformed majority). A neutral gamemaster called the Storyteller runs the game.

Each player is randomly assigned a secret good or evil role with a unique ability and must help their team achieve its win condition. The game is divided into days and nights. Each day, players can vote to remove one player (known as an "execution"), and each night, most demon characters may choose to remove another player. Normally, the good team wins by executing the demon, and the evil team wins by keeping the demon alive until only two players remain.

== Gameplay ==
=== Setup ===
Before the game begins, the Storyteller selects a script (or cast of characters), featuring 22–25 character roles in a standard game or 12 in a "Teensyville" game, and determines which of those roles will be in play for the game. Good players can either be Townsfolk, players with abilities that benefit the good team, or Outsiders, players with abilities that hinder the good team. Evil players can either be the Demon, who has the power to kill during the night and who must be killed for the good team to win, or Minions, supporters of the Demon with abilities that hinder the good team. The number of Minions and Outsiders depends on the number of players.

If a player is uncertain whether they can stay the entire game or they enter late, they can play as Travellers with special abilities. All players know what character the Traveller is, but not if they are good or evil.

=== Game phases ===
The game has two alternating phases: a night phase, during which players close their eyes and are "woken" one at a time by the Storyteller to gather information or perform actions; and a day phase, in which players socialize openly or in private, eventually resulting in a player's execution if a majority agrees.

During the night phase, actions are performed secretly for characters that act at night. The Storyteller may give misinformation to players who are "drunk" or "poisoned". On the first night, Minions and the Demon learn who each other are if there are seven or more players.

During the day phase, players wake and can choose to either speak privately with each other or publicly in the "Town Square". Good players use social deduction and the group's collective information to deduce who the evil players are. Evil players can exchange information and bluffs, as well as spread misinformation among the good players. Dead players are not eliminated and can participate freely in discussions. After an amount of time decided by the Storyteller, all players meet in the Town Square and have the opportunity to nominate players for execution. Execution occurs on a majority vote. Dead players each have one vote they can use for the remainder of the game.

In most cases, the game ends when the demon is executed, resulting in a good win, or there are only two living players remaining, resulting in an evil win.

== Scripts ==
There are currently three official scripts available from The Pandemonium Institute, which each come with their own roles and mechanics: "Trouble Brewing", "Sects & Violets", and "Bad Moon Rising". The three official scripts are bundled together when buying the game.

Three additional official scripts, "Garden of Sin", "The Tomb", and "Midnight in the House of the Damned", are being developed.

The Pandemonium Institute provides an online tool that allows players to create custom scripts by combining characters from different editions together, along with experimental characters that can be purchased separately as part of "The Carousel", a set of experimental character tokens.

== Reception ==
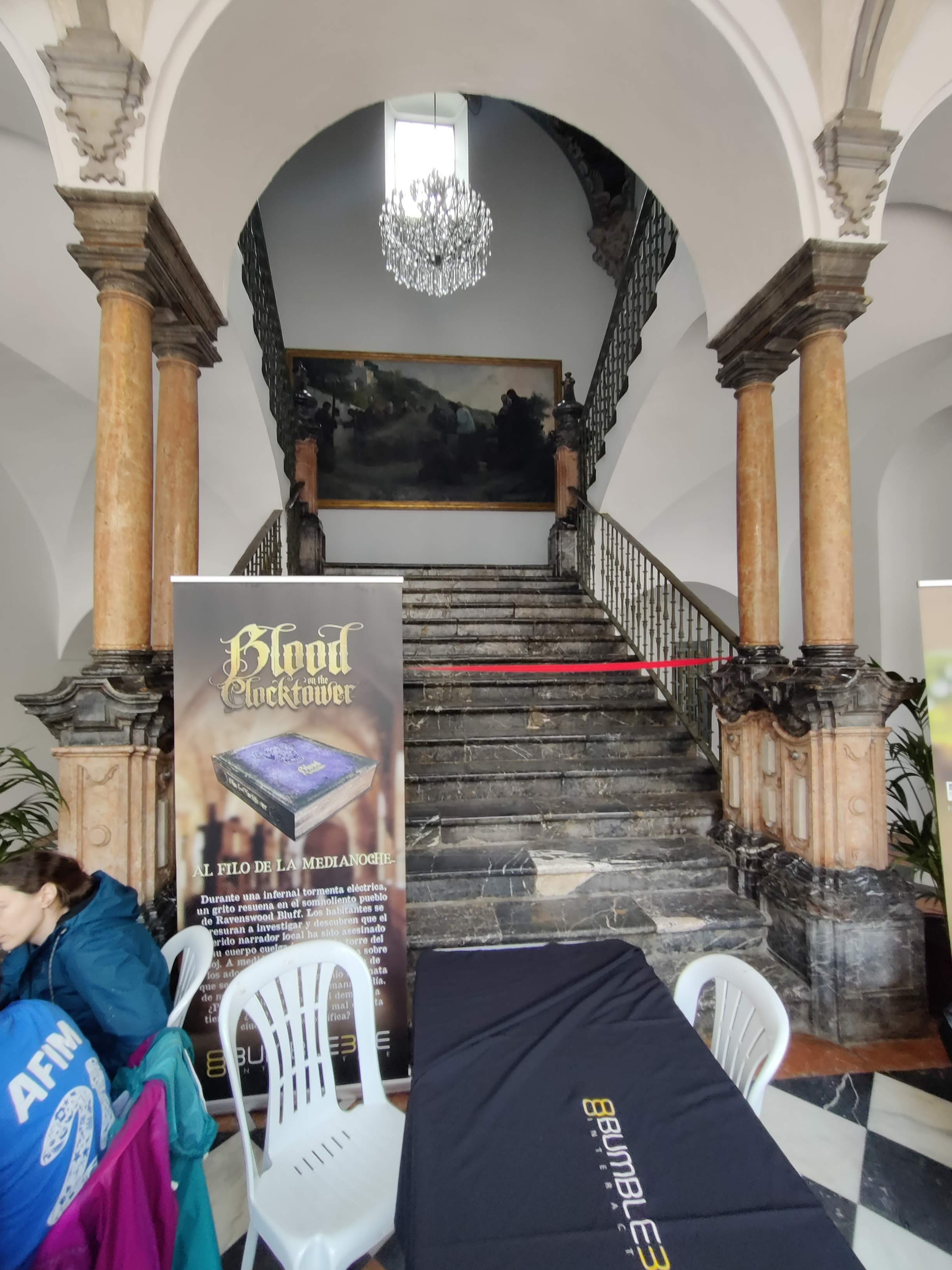
Roll-up in the Festival Internacional de Juegos en Córdoba 2024

Funding for Blood on the Clocktower began in 2018 with a Kickstarter campaign that raised more than $570,000 on a $65,000 goal. The game had already been in playtesting for years. During its development, the game was exhibited at various conventions and expos, including PAX 2018 and UK Games Expo 2018, and funds were raised for various "Clocktower Conventions" after its release.

During the Kickstarter campaign, Shut Up & Sit Down released a video review in which reviewer Quintin Smith called it his "favorite game".

A review for Wargamer described Blood on the Clocktower as the "all-round best social deduction game," stating that it "nails everything a great social deduction game needs, and it fixes many of the major problems the genre has."

Vanessa McGinnis and Charlie Hall of Polygon listed it as one of "The best board games we played in 2023," with McGinnis writing that "if the Storyteller plays their cards right, their players will be left with a new, exciting story to share each game. Those stories are what makes Clocktower so special".

In a brief review for The Guardian, Alex Hern described Blood on the Clocktower as "the Ulysses of the board games world", concluding that "neither small nor cheap, it’s not an ideal introduction to board games, but it’s the one that will stick with you for the longest."

In 2022, the game won "Best Party Game" by Tabletop Gaming. Christopher Eggett, editor of Tabletop Gaming, praised it for its enjoyable gameplay and "longevity" due to the many roles and setups. The game was also runner up for "Best Party Game" in BoardGameGeek's 2022 Golden Geek Awards.

=== Stage show adaptation ===
Blood on the Clocktower was adapted into an unscripted comedy show Blood on the Clocktower: Live! which has performed at various locations including Dynasty Typewriter, at the Old Red Lion Theatre in 2022, and at the Edinburgh Festival Fringe in 2024.

In a review of the show at the Edinburgh Festival Fringe in 2024, Ed Fortune of Starburst magazine noted the "charming and mischievous presence" of storyteller and host Jon Gracey, as well as Gracey's skill at choosing comedians to play the game on stage.
