= Dread Hunger =

2022 video game

- Developer: Dread Hunger Team
- Publisher: Digital Confectioners
- Platform: Microsoft Windows
- Release: January 26, 2022

Dread Hunger was a 2022 online multiplayer survival and social deduction game developed by Dread Hunger Team and published by Digital Confectioners.

As of December 2023, it is no longer available for sale and no longer has official servers, but tools for players to host their own games have been made available.

== Concept ==
The players are cast as the crew of a ship that must make its way through an arctic pass that is blocked by an iceberg. The crew must work together to survive, and find explosives in the environment to destroy the iceberg and sail the ship through the pass. However, their efforts are hampered by two of the crewmen secretly being "Dread Thralls", dangerous cannibalistic lunatics who seek to kill the rest of the crew and feast on their flesh. The Thralls must co-operate to stymie the crew's efforts and kill them one by one, while the crew must remain observant to figure out who among them is a traitorous Thrall, kill them, and escape.

== Gameplay ==
Dread Hunger was a social deception survival game with PvP and PvE elements.

== Development ==
The game was originally scheduled to release in late 2021.

On November 13, 2023, Dread Hunger Team announced that Dread Hunger's official servers would be shut down due to the inability to "support the surprisingly high ongoing server costs" as a result of the servers "being subjected to frequent and severe DDOS attacks". Dread Hunger's server tools will be transferred to players in order to "ensure that the spirit of the game remains alive in the hands of its most passionate supporters".

Dread Hunger was delisted from Steam on December 1, 2023, the game's official servers set to shut down on January 1, 2024. After official support ended, its community discovered ways to modify the game. The active community gathers on an unofficial Discord, which features a bot that can create lobbies for users to play with their friends.

== Reception ==
Reception

Aggregate score
Aggregator	Score
Metacritic	73/100

Dread Hunger received "mixed or average" reviews according to review aggregator Metacritic.

=== Sales ===
Dread Hunger has sold more than 1 million copies.
