= Copenhagen Game Collective =

Game design collective based in Denmark

Copenhagen Game Collective (CGC) is a multinational, non-profit game design collective based in Copenhagen, Denmark. It comprises a network of companies, non-commercial projects, and individuals.

CGC creates games of many types, including browser-based games, pervasive games, card games, board games, Wiimote games, social network games, mods, interactive stories, and other hybrids.

Copenhagen Game Collective has organized several game related events, including the first games and play festival in Copenhagen called w00t.

== Research ==
Some research papers and studies are done or published in relation to CGC, including:

- P. Jarnfelt, S. Selvig, D. Dimovska. Towards Tailoring Player Experience in Physical Wii Games: A Case Study on Relaxation. In Proceedings of the International Conference on Advances in Computer Entertainment Technology Conference (ACE ‘09). Athens, Greece. October 2009.
- D. Wilson, D. Dimovska, S. Selvig, P. Jarnfelt. Face-off in the Magic Circle: Getting Players to Look at Each Other, not the Screen. In Proceedings of the International Conference on Advances in Computer Entertainment Technology Conference (ACE ‘09). Athens, Greece. October 2009.
- D. Wilson, M. Sicart. Abusing the Player, and Making Them Like it Too! In Proceedings of the Digital Games Research Association (DiGRA ‘09). London, UK. September 2009.
- D. Dimovska, S. Selvig, P. Jarnfelt. Towards Tailoring the Emotional Experience in a Physical Wii Game through Artificial Neural Networks based on Physiology and Gesture Data. Masters Thesis, IT University of Copenhagen. Copenhagen, Denmark. August 2009.

== Games ==
A number of games were developed by the CGC, including:

- Face-off in the Magic Circle
- Where is my Heart?
- B.U.T.T.O.N
- Mutatione
- Collectible Business Card Game
- Train Mafia
- Game Studies Card Game
- 5 Minute MMORPG
- Dark Room
- Magnetize Me
- Idiots Attack the Top Noodle
