= Emiliano Sciarra =

Italian game designer

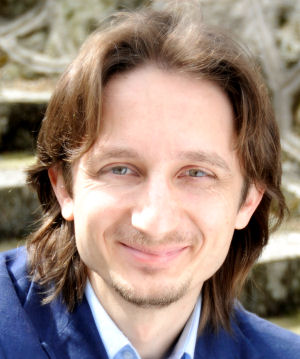
Emiliano Sciarra

Emiliano Sciarra (born December 6, 1971, in Civitavecchia, Rome, Italy) is a game designer of board games, card games and videogames.

He is the author of Bang!, a Wild West themed card game published by daVinci Editrice.

== Biography ==
He has been fascinated by games since when he was 12 years old, and he wrote simple board games and word games for his schoolmates and relatives. In the same time he also showed interest in computers (years later he earned a degree in Computer Science at Sapienza University of Rome).

In 1988 he published his first game: a shoot 'em up videogame for the Commodore 64 called Ciuffy (Systems Editoriale), created using the software SEUCK by Sensible Software.

Starting from 1999 he wrote several reviews, games and articles for the magazine PowerKaos and the fanzine Un'Altra Cosa, along with a brief "Little Informal Dictionary of Computer Science" (Piccolo Dizionario Informale di Informatica). His topics included logic puzzles, original games and theoretic discussions about the meaning of the game and its role in the human society.

Before becoming a professional game designer, he acquired experience as freelance computer programmer and Privacy advisor for several companies in Italy.

In 2000 he published Invader, a board game inspired by early 80s videogames like Space Invaders, on issues 69 and 70 of the magazine PowerKaos by Nexus Editrice.

In 2002 he published with daVinci Editrice, which was born shortly before, the card game Bang!, created two years earlier. Sciarra decided to submit the game after the members of the local Chess Club (founded by Sciarra himself in 1998) were so addicted to the game that they preferred to play Bang! instead of Chess. The game was illustrated by Alessandro Pierangelini with Stefano De Fazi as Art Director: they were all born in Civitavecchia, too, as well as the daVinci Executive Director, Domenico Di Giorgio.

Bang! hit the shelves in July 2002: without any marketing by daVinci, the game entirely sold the first run (2400 copies) in less than three months, instead of the three years estimated by the company. According to official figures by daVinci, the game sold more than 3,000,000 copies and is distributed in 22 countries over the world.

In 2003 he won an Origins Award for Best Traditional Card Game; another Origins Award was assigned to Stefano De Fazi and Alessandro Pierangelini for Best Graphic Design of a Card Game or Expansion. The game won also in 2002 the Best of Show Award at the Lucca Comics and Games fair.

He published several expansions for Bang!, including High Noon, Dodge City, Bang! - Face Off, and A Fistful of Cards.

In 2010 he published the book L'Arte del Gioco (The art of play, Mursia) with an own definition of game suitable for game critic as well as the view of the game as a form of art.

Apart from games, Emiliano Sciarra is also a skilled musician (he wrote the stage music for the local Live Pieces of Chess, as well as stage music for shows and movies) and he also organizes and is invited to public speeches regarding traditional arts and sciences, videogames and ludology.

== Publications ==
=== Videogames ===
- Ciuffy, Systems Editoriale (published on issue no. 19 of the magazine Software Club), 1988, for the Commodore 64.

=== Games ===
- Bang!, daVinci Editrice, 2002. The game was published in France also with the name of Wanted!. Illustrations by Alessandro Pierangelini
- Bang! High Noon, daVinci Editrice, 2003 (expansion for Bang!). Illustrations by Toni Cittadini
- Bang! Dodge City, daVinci Editrice, 2004 (expansion for Bang!). Illustrations by Alessandro Pierangelini
- Bang! - Face Off, Arima/daVinci, 2005 (game only in PDF). Illustrations by eriadan (Paolo Aldighieri)
- Bang! A Fistful of Cards, daVinci Editrice, 2005 (expansion for Bang!). Illustrations by eriadan
- Bang! - The Bullet, daVinci Editrice, 2007 (deluxe version with all the expansion and promotional characters until 2009).
- Bang! Wild West Show, dV Games (ex daVinci Editrice), 2010 (expansion for Bang!). Illustrations by Alberto Bontempi
- Bang! Gold Rush, dV Games, 2011 (expansion for Bang!). Illustrations by eriadan
- Samurai Sword, dV Games, 2011. Illustrations by Werther Dell'Edera
- Samurai Sword - Rising Sun, dV Games, 2014 (expansion for Samurai Sword). Illustrations by Werther Dell'Edera
- Bang! The Valley of Shadows, dV Games, 2014 (expansion for Bang!). Illustrations by Alberto Bontempi
- Bang! The Duel, dV Games, 2015. Illustrations by Rossana Berretta
- Bang! The Walking Dead, dV Games, 2015. Illustrations by "The Walking Dead" comics
- Bang! Halo, USAopoly, 2015
- Bang! Heroes of the Storm, USAopoly, 2015
- Bang! Armed & Dangerous, dV Giochi, 2017 (expansion for Bang!). Illustrations by Stefano Landini
- Captain Marvel: Secret Skrulls, USAopoli, 2019 (Bang! version with Marvel licence)
- Bang! The Duel - Renegades (expansion for Bang! - The Duel), 2019. Illustrations by Rossana Beretta
- FARMED, 2020 (didactic game for IFAD). Illustrations by Alberto Bontempi
- Bang! The Great Train Robbery, dV Games, 2022 (expansion for Bang!). Illustrations by Stefano Landini.

=== Books ===
- Family Games: The 100 Best (chapter on Knightmare Chess), by James Lowder (ed.), Green Ronin Pub., Seattle 2010
- L'Arte del Gioco [The Art of Play], Mursia, Milan 2010
