= DV Giochi =

Italian tabletop game publisher

dV Giochi, formerly daVinci Games, is an Italian publisher of board games and card games. The company was established in 2001 in Italy and its original name is an homage to the Italian genius and inventor Leonardo da Vinci.

Following its initial success, it concluded trade agreements with a wide network of international partners, and its games, with the dV Giochi brand, have been distributed worldwide, winning great recognition in Italy and abroad.

== Information ==
Once the company began working on commercials and making better relationships with international partners, the success of the company grew. dV Giochi also was able to win awards in Italy and other countries abroad. The games produced by dV Giochi are known by the highly interactive gameplay that is involved with them. The goal of the company is to provide a fun alternative to the usual forms of entertainment that include television, bars, nightclubs and movies.

dV Giochi collaborated with Mayfair Games until August 2008 and with them released the Origins award winning Bang!

== Games ==
Other popular daVinci games are:

Title	Year	Author	Description
BANG!	2002	Emiliano Sciarra	The best card game that recreates an old-fashioned spaghetti western shoot-out
Lupus in Tabula	2002	Domenico Di Giorgio	A game for large groups that is already a classic
BANG! High Noon	2003	Emiliano Sciarra	BANG! expansion
BANG! Dodge City	2004	Emiliano Sciarra	BANG! expansion
BANG! A Fistful of Cards	2005	Emiliano Sciarra & Co.	BANG! expansion
BANG! The Bullet	2007	Emiliano Sciarra	A special edition in a bullet-shaped metal box that includes BANG! and three expansions
BANG! New Edition	2008	Emiliano Sciarra	New edition
Lupus in Tabula - New Edition	2009	Domenico Di Giorgio	New edition
BANG! Wild West Show	2010	Emiliano Sciarra	BANG! expansion
BANG! Gold Rush	2011	Emiliano Sciarra	BANG! expansion
Samurai Sword	2012	Emiliano Sciarra	A game based on the proven BANG! mechanisms and set in feudal Japan.
Samurai Sword - Rising Sun	2014	Emiliano Sciarra	Samurai Sword expansion
Dark Tales	2014	Pierluca Zizzi	A card game inspired by classic fairy tales, retold in a dark style
Bang! The Duel	2015	Emiliano Sciarra	A two-player version of BANG!
Bang! The Walking Dead	2015	Emiliano Sciarra	A card game based on BANG! in which factions from The Walking Dead face off in a battle to survive
Dark Tales: Little Red Riding Hood	2015	Pierluca Zizzi	Dark Tales expansion
BANG! The Dice Game: Old Saloon	2016	Michael Palm, Lukas Zach	BANG! The Dice Game expansion
13 Clues	2016	Andrés J.Voicu	A simple yet brilliant deduction game
Dark Tales: Cinderella	2016	Pierluca Zizzi	Dark Tales expansion
Deckscape: Test Time	2017	Martino Chiacchiera, Silvano Sorrentino	First title of the tabletop escape room series
Deckscape: The Fate of London	2017	Martino Chiacchiera, Silvano Sorrentino	Second title of the tabletop escape room series
Dark Tales: The Little Mermaid	2017	Pierluca Zizzi	Dark Tales expansion
3 Secrets	2017	Martino Chiacchiera, Pierluca Zizzi	A cooperative card game about elusive characters and hidden truths
BANG! - Armed & Dangerous	2017	Emiliano Sciarra	BANG! expansion
Minute Realms	2017	Stefano Castelli	The most compact city-building game ever
Origami	2017	Christian Giove	Combine the abilities of your cards to earn the title of "Best Origami Artist"
Catalyst	2018	Permar Rodaser	A card drafting and combo-building game with an innovative twist on classic game mechanics
Deckscape: Heist in Venice	2018	Martino Chiacchiera, Silvano Sorrentino	Third title of the tabletop escape room series
Deckscape: The Mystery of Eldorado	2018	Martino Chiacchiera, Silvano Sorrentino	Fourth title of the tabletop escape room series
Stoplight	2018	Martino Chiacchiera	A high-speed game with squishy dice
3 Segreti - Crime Time	2019	Martino Chiacchiera, Pierluca Zizzi	From the same game line: 3 Secrets. Includes two game modes: cooperative and competitive.
BANG! The Dice Game - Undead or alive	2019	Michael Palm, Lukas Zach	BANG! The Dice Game expansion
BANG! The Duel - Renegades	2019	Emiliano Sciarra	BANG! The Duel expansion
Deckscape: Behind the Curtain	2019	Martino Chiacchiera, Silvano Sorrentino	Fifth title of the tabletop escape room series
Deckscape: The curse of the Sphinx	2019	Martino Chiacchiera, Silvano Sorrentino	Sixth title of the tabletop escape room series
Decktective: Bloody-red Roses	2019	Martino Chiacchiera, Silvano Sorrentino	First game in a line of pocket mystery crime with a 3D crime scene
Origami: Legends	2019	Christian Giove	A fast, fun card game for everyone. Combine it with Origami for an even more challenging play.
Decktective: The Gaze of the Ghost	2020	Martino Chiacchiera, Silvano Sorrentino	Second game in a line of pocket mystery crime with a 3D crime scene
Deckscape: Escape from Alcatraz	2020	Martino Chiacchiera, Silvano Sorrentino	Seventh title of the tabletop escape room series
Decktective: Nightmare in the Mirror	2021	Martino Chiacchiera, Silvano Sorrentino	Third game in a line of pocket mystery crime with a 3D crime scene
Deckscape Crew vs Crew: Pirates' Island	2021	Martino Chiacchiera, Silvano Sorrentino	Eighth title of the tabletop escape room series
Decktective: The Will without an Heir	2021	Martino Chiacchiera, Silvano Sorrentino	Fourth game in a line of pocket mystery crime with a 3D crime scene
Deckscape: Dracula's Castle	2021	Martino Chiacchiera, Silvano Sorrentino	Ninth title of the tabletop escape room series
Wonder Book	2021	Martino Chiacchiera, Michele Piccolini	A cooperative, narrative-driven dungeon-crawler game played on an interactive pop-up scenario
