= Dale & Dawson Stationery Supplies =

2024 video game

- Developer: Striped Panda Studios
- Publisher: Striped Panda Studios
- Engine: Unity
- Platform: Windows
- Release: 30 August 2024
- Genre: Social deduction
- Mode: Multiplayer

Dale & Dawson Stationery Supplies is a multiplayer social deduction video game developed and published by Striped Panda Studios for Windows.

== Development ==
The game was released on 30 August 2024 through Steam.

== Gameplay ==
Players perform tasks in an office space and can be assigned one of three roles at the beginning of a round. Specialists perform positive tasks, while slackers perform negative tasks. The goal of the specialists is for the manager to fire all of the slackers. The slackers can win a round if enough specialists are fired, or if they perform enough tasks to outperform the specialists.

If a manager does not fire an employee in a certain timeframe, then they are automatically fired and replaced by another player.

== Reception ==
The game gained popularity through the social media platforms YouTube and Twitch. Trevor Ford of TheGamer selected it as a nominee for the website's game of the year award.
