= Deception (board game) =

Board game

Deception: Murder in Hong Kong
- Designers: Tobey Ho
- Illustrators: Tommy Ng, Ari Wong
- Publishers: Grey Fox games (2015)
- Players: 4-12
- Setup time: 5 minutes
- Playing time: 20 minutes
- Chance: Low
- Skills: Deduction, logic

Deception: Murder in Hong Kong is a board game for 4 to 12 players designed by Tobey Ho and published by Grey Fox games in 2015. Set as a detective investigation scene, in Deception players find themselves in a scenario of intrigue and murder, deduction and deception. Players take on the roles of investigators attempting to solve a murder case, but one of the investigators is actually the killer. Different roles are randomly assigned at the start of play. As the investigators attempt to deduce the truth, the murderer's team must deceive and mislead.

The game was originally released via Kickstarter, raising over $65000. Deception received positive reviews, and was awarded with the Dice Tower Seal of Excellence.

== Gameplay ==
In Deception: Murder in Hong Kong, each player first receives a secret role: Forensic Scientist, Witness, Investigator, Murderer, or Accomplice. Everyone then closes their eyes except for the forensic scientist, who instructs the murderer to open his eyes. The murderer does so, revealing himself to the scientist, and he points to one of the five murder weapons in front of them and one of their five pieces of evidence.

The Scientist has the solution but can express the clues only using special scene tiles while the investigators (and the murderer) attempt to interpret the evidence. In order to succeed, the investigators must deduce the truth from the clues of the Forensic Scientist. The Murderer and his Accomplice try to secretly mislead the real detectives by picking the wrong weapon and clue.

== Release and reception ==
Deception: Murder in Hong Kong was initially sold via Kickstarter, with 1,796 backers contributing $65,777 during the campaign. It was delivered to backers in December 2015 and then released in retail stores.

Deception: Murder in Hong Kong won the Dice Tower Seal of Excellence. The website BoardGameGeek gave it the score of 7.5/10.

== Expansions ==
The first expansion, Undercover Allies, was released in December 2017, adding three new roles to the game (Lab Technician, Protective Detail, and Inside Man). It adds also more clue cards and tokens to the game, allowing it to be played by 14 players.

== See also ==
- The Resistance (game)
- Mafia
- Werewolves
