= Bang! (card game) =

2002 card game

- Designers: Emiliano Sciarra
- Illustrators: Alex Pierangelini
- Publishers: DV Giochi; Mayfair Games
- Players: 4–7 (3–8 with expansion sets)
- Setup time: approx. 5–10 min.
- Playing time: 20–90 minutes
- Chance: Card drawing
- Skills: Card playing

Bang! is a Spaghetti Western-themed social deduction card game designed by Emiliano Sciarra and released by Italian publisher DV Giochi in 2002. In 2004, Bang! won the Origins Award for Best Traditional Card Game of 2003 and Best Graphic Design of a Card Game or Expansion.

The game is known worldwide as Bang!, except in France, where it was known as Wanted! until September 2009.

== Overview ==
The game is played by four to seven players (up to eight players with variants and expansions). Each player receives a unique character card with special abilities and a number of 'bullets' (representing life points), and takes one of the four roles with different objectives:

- Sheriff (always one), whose objective is to kill all Outlaws and the Renegade(s); the player with this role has one extra bullet (life point), which is added to their max life point count, and reveals their role card to all players.
- Deputy (from zero to two), whose objective is the same as the Sheriff's.
- Outlaw (from two to three), whose objective is to kill the Sheriff.
- Renegade (one in the base game; an expansion can add an extra one), whose objective is to be the last player still in play, with the Sheriff being the last one dead.

The game is played in turns, in clockwise order, starting with the Sheriff. Each player's turn has three phases:

Draw: Draw cards from the draw pile, two by default.
Play: Play cards to heal or buff the player's character (any number can be played, although some have timing limitations), or attack other players in an attempt to eliminate them. When attacking, the player can only target other players within distance, based on the weapon they have in play.
Discard: Discard cards down to the hand size limit (equal to the number of bullets shown on the player's character card).

Each character comes with a set number of life points and a unique ability. For instance, from the 16 characters in the base game set, "Bart Cassidy" (based on Butch Cassidy) starts with 4 bullets and draws a card every time he loses a life point, while "Willy the Kid" (based on Billy the Kid) starts with 4 bullets and can play any number of "Bang!" cards during his turn.

A player who loses their last bullet is considered dead; they are out of the game with their role card revealed. Penalties and rewards also apply to encourage the social deduction aspects of the game. For example, if the Sheriff player eliminates a Deputy, that player must discard all the cards in hand and in play.

The game ends as soon as the Sheriff dies or the last Outlaw and/or Renegade dies, after which the winners are determined. Players who are already dead when the game ends are still considered to have won if their team's win condition is met.

== Strategy ==
In 2002, designer Emiliano Sciarra posted strategy tips on BoardGameGeek.

As only the Sheriff is known to all players, it is hard to know who has what role. Generally, a player's role is implied if they try to shoot, or otherwise harm, the Sheriff. Others' roles can be implied if they try to harm those who harmed the Sheriff. The advantage of keeping one's role hidden from enemies must be weighed against the need to accomplish one's goal.

Since the Renegade loses if the Sheriff dies while there are still other players in play, that player must defend the Sheriff to some extent. On the other hand, their ultimate goal is killing the Sheriff. This leads to a "two-faced" nature of the Renegade, trying to weaken each side (Outlaws and Deputies) while keeping the Sheriff alive until the end. This also makes it harder to ascertain who is an Outlaw, who is a Deputy, and who is a Renegade, as their actions may be similar.

== Expansions ==
- Bang! High Noon (2003): The expansion (referencing 1952 film High Noon) contains thirteen scenario cards. When playing with these cards, the Sheriff player gets to reveal one at the start of their turn; each scenario is effective until the next one is revealed. These cards include "Shootout" (each player can play an extra "Bang!" attack on their turn), and the final scenario "High Noon" (each player loses 1 life point when they start their turn for the remainder of the game).
- Bang! Dodge City (2004): The expansion (referencing 1939 film Dodge City) adds 15 new characters, 40 new playing cards and 8 "role" cards (7 duplicates) allowing up to 8 people to play. It features a new symbol, meaning "discard another card to play this card", and new green-bordered cards that take effect in the next opponent's turn (in case of a Missed! effect) or the owner's next turn (in all other cases).
- Bang! A Fistful Of Cards (2005): The expansion (referencing 1964 film A Fistful of Dollars) contains fifteen new scenario cards, which can be mixed with the High Noon expansion. These were designed by players and selected by the original author. The titular "Fistful of Cards" can be used as an alternative to "High Noon" as the last scenario card, and makes each player the target of as many "Bang!" attacks as the number of cards in hand at the start of their turn.
- Bang! Wild West Show (2010): The expansion features characters that parody iconic western movie genre actors and directors, such as "Flint Westwood" (Clint Eastwood), "Gregory Deck" (Gregory Peck), "Lee Van Kliff" (Lee van Cleef), "Big Spencer" (Bud Spencer), "Teren Kill" (Terence Hill), "Gary Looter" (Gary Cooper), "Youl Grinner" (Yul Brynner) and "John Pain" (John Wayne). It also includes 10 special cards that play similarly to the scenario cards in High Noon and A Fistful of Cards, but are revealed differently, namely every time a "Stagecoach" or "Wells Fargo" is played. With the titular "Wild West Show", killing the Sheriff no longer ends the game (although roles otherwise apply as normal) as the game objective is changed to simply being the last player alive.
- Bang! Gold Rush (2011): The expansion introduces a new resource called Gold Nuggets, which are mainly used to purchase equipments. It also introduces a new role mechanic called the Shadow-Gunslinger, which allows an eliminated player to return to the game as if they were still alive. It includes 8 new characters and 24 equipment cards.
- Bang! The Valley of Shadows (2014): The expansion adds 8 new characters and 16 playing cards. It was first unofficially released in September 2011 in Czechia and Slovakia, and officially released on October 16, 2014 by the Czech editor ALBI.
- Bang! Armed & Dangerous (2017): The expansion introduces a new resource called Loads, and features new orange-bordered cards that require Loads for their effects to take place. It includes 8 new characters and 28 playing cards.
- Bang! Great Train Robbery (2021): The expansion introduces a new mechanic called the Train, and features Station tiles, Railcar cards and a double-sided Locomotive card; the Railcars each have beneficial effects, but must first be acquired by paying the cost as indicated on the corresponding Station before they can be used. It includes 8 new characters and 16 additional playing cards.
- Bang! Legends (2024): The expansion introduces alternative character cards that can be used in place of the base game character cards; these cards are double-sided, with the other side featuring the "Legendary" version with an enhanced ability. For this purpose, the expansion also includes 16 Feat tiles and 35 wooden Fame tokens in 7 different shapes and colors.

== Special releases ==
- Bang! The Bullet! (2007): This deluxe version included the base game (3rd ed) High Noon (2nd ed), Dodge City (2nd ed), and A Fistful of Cards (2nd edition), along two additional High Noon cards, and three special character cards: "Uncle Will" (named after Will Niebling, former CEO of Mayfair Games which published the game in the USA until 2008); "Johnny Kisch" (named after Jo Nikisch, CEO of Abacus Spiele, the German publisher of the game), and 'Claus "The Saint"' (who gives an extra card to other players each turn; the author considers this character to be unbalanced and not suited for serious play; it was originally a bonus "unglued" card included in the online daVinci newsletter). The 2009 reprint, which follows the 4th edition rules of the basic game and the 3rd edition rules of Dodge City, does not include player boards or wooden bullets as found in the boxed version of BANG! 4th edition.
- Bang! 10th Anniversary Edition (2012): The set comes in a metal tin, and contained the complete most recent version of the base game with the original 16 characters. It also contains 30 wooden bullet markers for keeping track of health, 7 player boards with different artwork, and 10 extra characters — "Annie Versary", who may use any card as a "Bang!" card, and nine characters from previous expansions.
- Bang! Dynamite Box Standard Edition (2023): Released to celebrate the game's 20th Anniversary, it contains a storage box designed to store the BANG! base game and expansions (not included). It also contains a Stick of Dynamite used in a new game variant, 34 wooden bullet markers for keeping track of players' life points, and 8 premium dual-layer player boards with different artwork and recessed slots to house cards and wooden bullets.
- Bang! Dynamite Box Collector's Edition (2023): The set contains the contents from the Standard Edition as well as the base game and expansions, and 9 promo cards including "Annie Versary", and a new "Emiliano" character named after BANG! designer Emiliano Sciarra.

== Spin-offs ==
=== Bang! The Dice Game ===
This is a standalone game where, instead of laying down cards, players roll dice during each of their turns. The game also introduces an exclusive gameplay mechanic where players can receive an arrow from a dice roll; once all arrow tokens are taken, players lose life points based on the number of arrows they have, and the arrow tokens are returned. The overall gameplay is otherwise the same as the original card game.

=== Bang! The Duel ===
This is a two-player standalone game, where one player controls a team of law enforcers, while the other player controls a team of bandits. It contains 12 enforcer characters and 12 bandit characters.

== Computer versions ==
On October 29, 2009, Palzoun Entertainment (which acquired the official license from DaVinci Games) announced the development of a Bang! video game. The game was developed in partnership with SpinVector. It was published on the iTunes App Store on December 18, 2010. A console version was also expected to arrive in March 2011 but has been delayed.

BoardGameArena (BGA) is a real time board game online game system that allows to play Bang! along with some of its expansions. It was published on the 23 February 2022.

Some unofficial online versions of Bang! have been released during the years, however those using copyrighted assets have received DMCA takedown notices. Others have replaced the images.

== Lawsuit ==
In 2014, DaVinci Editrice initiated a lawsuit against Ziko Games, the Chinese manufacturer that had published Legends of the Three Kingdoms, a game that DaVinci claimed was a clone of Bang!, simply changing the Wild West theme and art to that of ancient China. While the court found there was potential for copyright infringement on its initial hearing, it ultimately ruled in favor of Ziko Games and dismissed the case in 2016.

== Reviews ==
- Family Games: The 100 Best
- Pyramid
- Rebel Times #15

== See also ==
- Mafia (party game)
