= The Werewolves of Millers Hollow =

Card party game

The Werewolves of Miller's Hollow
- Designers: Philippe des Pallières and Hervé Marly
- Illustrators: Alexios Tjoyas (Basic Game, New Moon and The Village); Misda and Christine Deschamps (Characters)
- Publishers: Asmodee Editions
- Years active: 2001: Basic Game; 2006: New Moon; 2009: The Village; 2012: Characters; 2014: The Pact
- Genres: Character game
- Languages: French
- Players: between 8 and 47
- Playing time: half an hour
- Age range: 10+
- Website: lesloupsgarous.free.fr

The Werewolves of Miller's Hollow (French: Les Loups-garous de Thiercelieux, or sometimes only referred as Loups-garous) is a card game created by the French authors Philippe des Pallières and Hervé Marly that can be played with 8 to 18 players. The game is based on the Russian game Mafia. It was nominated for the 2003 Spiel des Jahres award. It is named after Thiercelieux, a small French village with less than 60 citizens.

== Gameplay ==
Before the game starts, a person will be designated as the game master. That person then randomly gives each player a card, after which each player secretly discovers their identity by looking at the card.

All players are divided into two teams: the townsfolk (some of them having special roles) and the werewolves. The townsfolk's aim is to uncover and eliminate all werewolves, while the werewolves' aim is to stay undiscovered and eliminate all townspeople.

The game follows a day-night cycle and is structured as follows:

- During the night, all players close their eyes and any form of communication is prohibited. When called by the game master, the werewolves wake up and, via gestures, designate a townsperson to be their victim. Townspeople with special roles will also be called out in order to use their respective abilities.
- Once the day comes back, all players reopen their eyes and the game master reveals the identity of the victims, said victims being not allowed to further participate in the game but being able to keep their eyes open and spectate. The townspeople try to unmask the werewolves, while the werewolves must avoid being uncovered by redirecting the suspicions onto someone else.

Once the debate ends, each player points at the person they think is a werewolf. The player with the majority of the votes is then "executed", and the game master reveals their identity. Said player is then eliminated, and the game resumes on the arrival of the night.

During the first day, an additional action may be done before designating the werewolf: it's namely voting for the village's Sheriff. Anyone can present themselves, and the Sheriff is nominated by majority vote. Their power can stack on top of their eventual additional skills, and they are very important: in fact, the vote of the Sheriff counts as two. Should the Sheriff be eliminated, they designate their successor.

The game ends when there are only townspeople or only werewolves left.

== In other media ==
=== Television ===
The game was adapted into a game show titled Loups-Garous in 2024. The show premiered on October 11, 2024, on Canal+.

BNNVARA produced a Dutch reality show titled Wolven, based on the card game. It was hosted by Soundos El Ahmadi and Pieter Derks. It premiered on August 29, 2026, on NPO 1 and Disney+.

=== Film ===
The Werewolves of Miller's Hollow was adapted for Netflix into a 2024 French live-action fantasy-comedy film titled Loups-Garous (Family Pack in English).

Directed by François Uzan, Family Pack centers on a family that get magically transported into the medieval world of Miller's Hollow; to go back home, they must help the townspeople identify and eliminate the bloodthirsty werewolves.

The official teaser for Family Pack was released on April 5, 2024, and the official trailer on September 6, 2024. The film was released on Netflix on October 23, 2024.

== Reviews ==
- Rue Morgue #37
