= The Resistance (game) =

Social role-playing game

The Resistance Avalon
- Designers: Don Eskridge
- Publication: 2010
- Players: 5 to 10
- Setup time: less than 6 minutes
- Playing time: 15–30 minutes
- Chance: Low
- Skills: Precise logical deduction; Strategic thought; Team play; Social skills; Roleplay

The Resistance is a social role-playing card-based social deduction party game. The game's premise involves a war between government and resistance groups, and players are assigned various roles related to these groups. A King Arthur themed-variant with additional roles is marketed as Avalon. Like other social deduction games, The Resistance and Avalon rely on certain players attempting to disrupt the larger group working together, while the rest of the players work to reveal the spy working against them.

Games take upwards of half an hour, and are played with five to ten players. The Resistance was initially playable with a standard 52-card deck of playing cards, but the newest version of the game includes extra cards which cannot be simulated in such a way. The published version of the game includes a board to track progress, role cards, voting cards, mission success and fail cards, tokens, and additional game-modifying plot cards. Thematically, the game shares the same dystopian setting as Coup and Grifters, two other games by Indie Board & Cards.

== Gameplay ==
At the start of the game, one third of the set of players (rounded up) is randomly and secretly chosen to be government spies infiltrating the rest of the group (the Resistance). One of the players (either a spy or Resistance member) is selected to be the Mission Leader. The government spies are made aware of each other without the Resistance knowing – the only thing the Resistance knows is how many government spies exist, not who they are. This process is conducted by the first Mission Leader, who instructs the group to close their eyes, for the spies to open their eyes and see each other, for the spies to close their eyes again, and then for everyone to open their eyes and begin the game (with long pauses at each stage). Players may never reveal their identity cards to other players (unless the game is being played with "Plot Cards" as discussed below).

Number of Resistance Members & Government Spies
Number of players:	5	6	7	8	9	10
Resistance	3	4	4	5	6	6
Spies	2	2	3	3	3	4

=== Rounds ===
During each round of the game, the player to the left of the previous Leader becomes the new Leader. The Leader selects a certain number of players to send out on a mission, starting with Mission 1. The table below shows the required number of players to go out on each mission. All of the players then discuss the Leader's choice and, simultaneous and in public, vote on whether to accept the team make-up or not. If a majority of players votes no to the proposal or if it is a tie, leadership passes on to the next player to the left and the process repeats with this Leader. This continues until a majority of players agrees with the current Leader's mission assignment. After five successively rejected mission proposals in a single mission, the Spies immediately win the game.

Number of Players Per Mission
Number of players:	5	6	7	8	9	10
1st Mission Team	2	2	2	3	3	3
2nd Mission Team	3	3	3	4	4	4
3rd Mission Team	2	4	3	4	4	4
4th Mission Team	3	3	4	5	5	5
5th Mission Team	3	4	4	5	5	5

Once a mission team is agreed on, the players then "go" on the mission. To "go" on a mission, players on the mission are given a set of Mission Cards, one for indicating Success, the other indicating Fail. Each player turns in a Mission card, face down. Resistance players are required to play a Mission Success card. Spies may either secretly turn in a Mission Success (to keep their identity a secret) or Mission Fail (to win the mission with the risk of their identity being revealed) card. The cards are shuffled and then revealed. If one (or two in Mission 4 when at least 7 players are playing) Mission Fail cards were turned in, the Spies win a point for the active mission. Otherwise, the Resistance players win a point for the active mission. The game continues until either one team wins by accumulating 3 points or 5 mission assignments in a single mission have been rejected.

=== Other details ===
In the game's second edition, the full game comes with several additional Plot Cards which are handed out by the Leader at the start of each round. Plot cards have special effects when played. These effects allow a player to view specific hidden information, or to change the usual flow of play. The Plot Cards are not included in the third edition, though the Inquisitor role is.

=== Avalon variant ===
A variant of The Resistance was released in 2012 called Avalon. Reviewers from Ars Technica praised the game's engagement, and described the gameplay "requires more than a little cunning, treachery, and a willingness to make wild, baseless accusations".

Avalon includes six new character roles which alter the game: two good and four evil. Most notably, Merlin knows the identity of some or all evil players, but must be careful not to reveal themself to the evil Assassin. Another pair of roles are Percival and Morgana- Percival secretly learns that two players are Merlin and Morgana, but does not know which player is which role. Finally, Mordred is unknown to Merlin while Oberon is unknown to other evil players, and thus these roles can be utilized to help balance gameplay.

== Expansions ==
=== Hidden Agenda ===
Hidden Agenda introduces three rule modules to the base game that may be played alone or combined with one another.

- Assassin Module: This ruleset reflavors the roles from The Resistance: Avalon to be compatible with Resistance's dystopian setting, e.g. Merlin becoming the Commander.
- Defector Module: One spy and one resistance operative are defectors who randomly swap their allegiances within the game.
- Trapper Module: The Leader selects an additional operative to go on the mission thereby increasing the odds that a spy is selected, but the leader must select, view, then discard one player's mission card.

=== Hostile Intent ===
Hostile Intent also introduces three more rule modules to the base game:

- Inquisitor Module: The Inquisitor may secretly look another player's loyalty after each mission. It is open information who has the Inquisitor ability, and it is passed on to whichever player was just examined. A player who has had the Inquisitor ability cannot be investigated.
- Reverser Module: Both spy and resistance sides have one Reverser which can alter the results of any mission they're on.
- Hunter Module: Both spy and resistance sides have one Chief and one Hunter in their ranks. Each Hunter must identify the opposing side's Chief to win.

=== The Plot Thickens ===
The Plot Thickens adds new rulesets to the game and includes new copies of base game components including character cards, mission cards, and tokens. The plot cards from the second edition return to the third edition, and the Sergeant and Rogue modules which were originally released bonuses with the 2014 Kickstarter campaign for Hostile Intent and Hidden Agenda make an appearance.

- The Plot Thickens Module: Plot cards are single-use abilities granted to each Mission Leader for use later at critical times.
- Sergeant Module: When embarking on a mission, that turn's Leader may assign another mission member the Sergeant role. The Sergeant may secretly view and alter one other player's mission card.
- Rogue Module: One spy and one resistance operative are considered Rogues and have win conditions separate from their respective teams.

== Differences from similar games ==
The Resistance was designed to have several distinctions from similar games like Mafia or Werewolf. In Mafia, a player is eliminated during every day round and every night round. Being eliminated from the game early prevents one from playing most of the game. In The Resistance, on the other hand, players are never eliminated, and get to play in every round. In Mafia, the players never have any information about the mafiosi given away by the game (until they successfully lynch a mafia). The players never know which way any of the mafia voted. In The Resistance, a failed mission gives definite information that at least one of the players who went on the mission is an Imperial Spy. However, in games like Mafia there is a Narrator, a person with an omniscient point of view which allows more of the storytelling aspect that Resistance lacks.

Deception is a similar game using investigators and items clues to guess who is the murderer.
