= Mafia (party game) =

Social deduction game

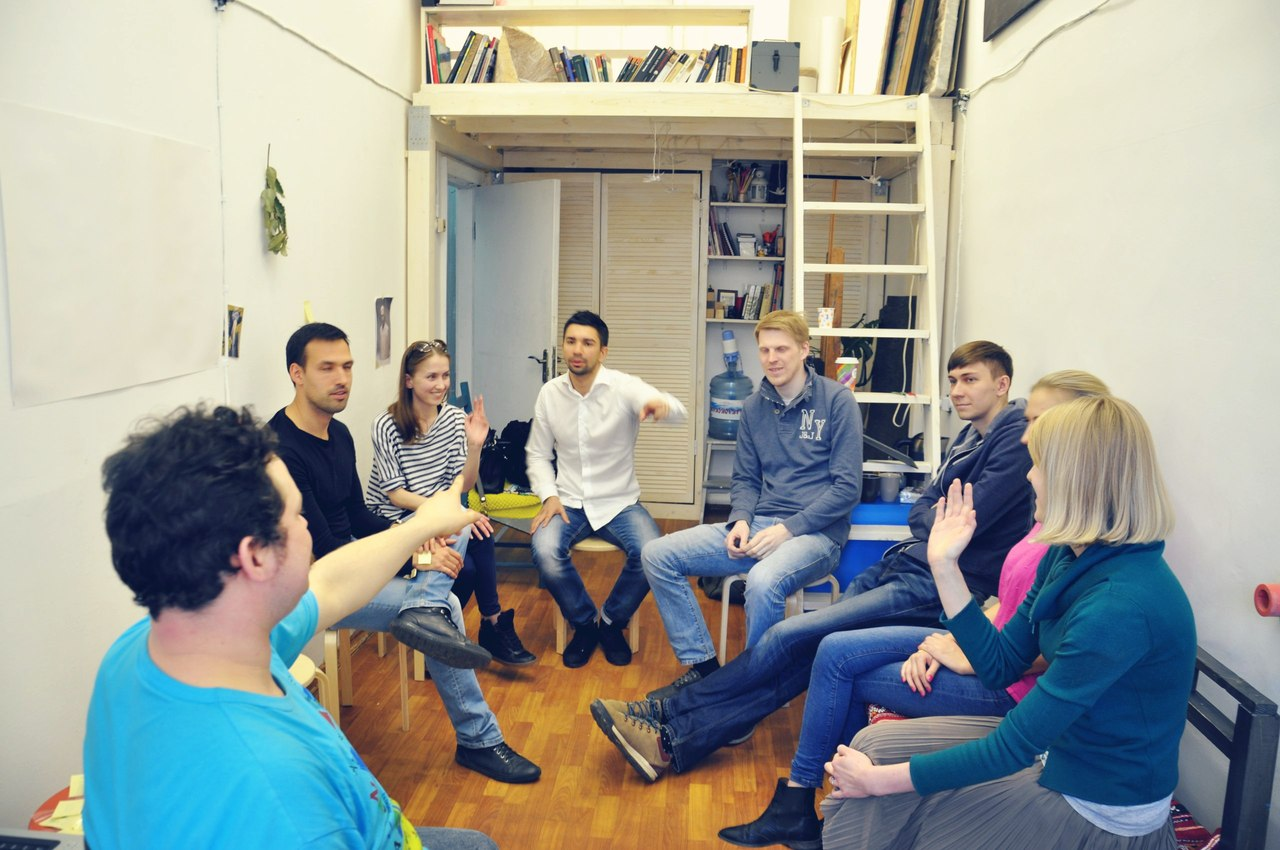
- Players making accusations in a game of Mafia
- Other names: Werewolf
- Designers: Dmitry Davidoff
- Players: At least 6; 10 for classic
- Setup time: < 6 minutes
- Playing time: 15–90 minutes
- Age range: 9+ or 10+
- Skills: Strategy, team play, social skills, roleplay, lying

Mafia, also known as Werewolf, is a social deduction game created in 1986 by Dmitry Davidoff, then a psychology student at Moscow State University. The game models a conflict between two groups: an informed minority (the mafiosi or the werewolves) and an uninformed majority (the villagers). At the start of the game, each player is secretly assigned a role affiliated with one of these teams. The game has two alternating phases: first, a night-phase, during which those with night-killing-powers may covertly kill other players, and second, a day-phase, in which all surviving players debate and vote to eliminate a suspect. The game continues until a faction achieves its win condition; for the village, this usually means eliminating the evil minority, while for the minority, this usually means reaching numerical parity with the village and eliminating any rival evil groups.

== History ==
Dimitry Davidoff (Russian: Дми́трий Давы́дов, Dmitry Davydov) is generally acknowledged as the game's creator. He dates the first game of Mafia to spring 1987 at the Psychology Department of Moscow State University, from where it spread to the classrooms, dorms, and summer camps. Davidoff says that he brought Mafia into the Psychology department classrooms for research and it spread (as a meme) from there to dormitories and likely over next summer, through student summer camps. He credits this game-based methodology to pioneering 1920s psychologist Lev Vygotsky and the Turing test. He developed the game to combine psychology research with his duties teaching high school students. It became popular in other colleges and schools in the Soviet Union, often associated with hugely popular TV series La Piovra, which first ran in 1986. In the 1990s, it began to be played in other parts of Europe (in some countries under the name City of Palermo) and then the United States. By the mid 1990s, a version of the game became a Latvian television series with a parliamentary setting, and played by Latvian celebrities.

In 1997, the werewolf theme was added to the game by Andrew Plotkin (also known as Zarf), arguing that the mafia had less cultural resonance, and that the werewolf concept fit the idea of a hidden enemy who looked normal during the daytime.

The Werewolf variant of Mafia became widespread at major tech events, including the Game Developers Conference, ETech, Foo Camps, and South By Southwest. In 1998, the Kaliningrad Higher school of the Internal Affairs Ministry published the methodical textbook Nonverbal communications. Developing role-playing games 'Mafia' and 'Murderer' for a course on Visual psychodiagnostics, to teach reading body language and nonverbal signals. In September 1998, Mafia was introduced to the Graduate College at Princeton University, where several variants were developed. The werewolf theme was also incorporated in the French adaption of Mafia, The Werewolves of Millers Hollow.

In 2016, a film, Mafia: The Game of Survival was made in Russia based on the game; however, it received negative reviews.

== Gameplay ==
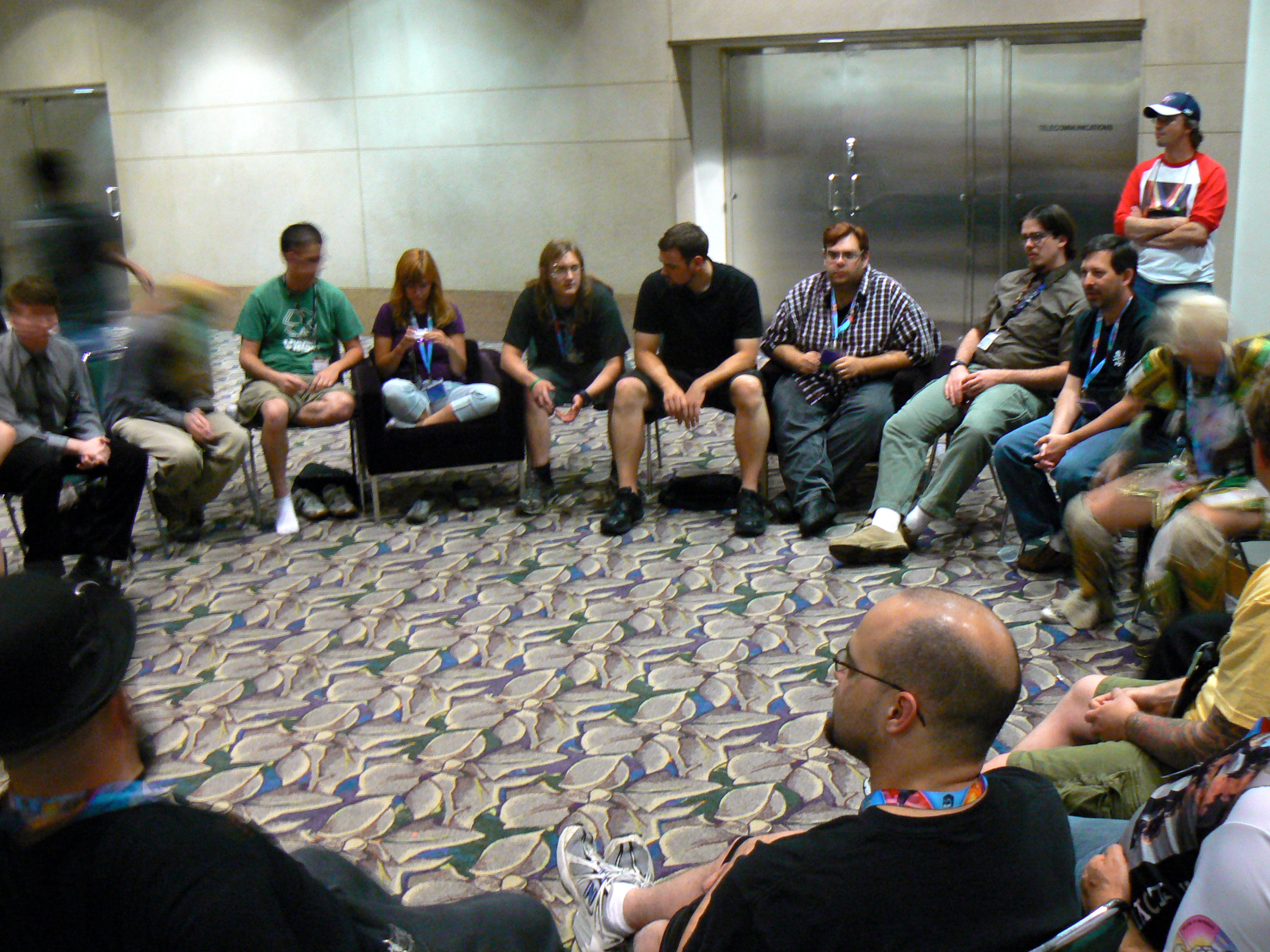
Players often sit in a circle.

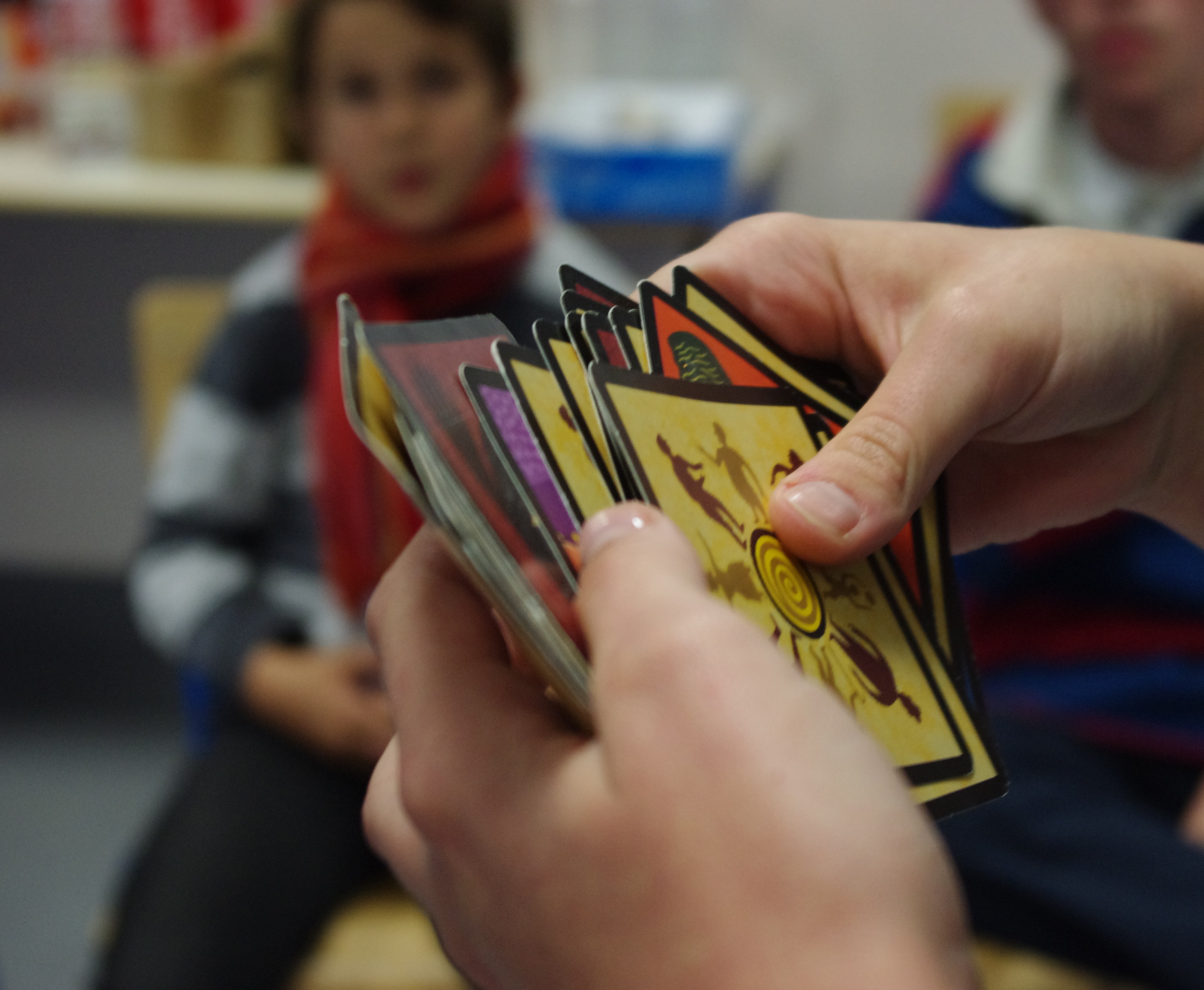
Cards for a Werewolf version of Mafia are held by the dealer at the beginning of the game.

In its simplest form, Mafia is played by two teams: the mafiosi and the villagers. Live games require a moderator who does not participate as a player, and identities are assigned by handing out cards, or by other non-verbal methods such as physically tapping players. At the start of the game, every mafioso is given the identities of their teammates, whereas the innocents only receive the number of mafiosi in the game.

In an open setup, the numbers of each power role (e.g. militia) present in the game is known to the players, while in a closed setup, this information is not revealed, and in a semi-open setup, only limited or tentative information about the power roles is revealed.

There are two phases: night and day. At night, certain players secretly perform special actions; during day, players discuss and vote to eliminate one player. These phases alternate with each other until all mafiosi have been eliminated or they reach numerical parity with the innocents.

Some players may be given roles with special abilities (see below). Common special roles include an investigative role, a protector role, and some association roles.

Andrew Plotkin recommends having exactly two mafiosi, whereas the original Davidoff rules suggest a third of the players (rounding to the nearest whole number) be mafiosi. Davidoff's original game does not include roles with special abilities. In his rules for "Werewolf", Plotkin recommends that the first phase be night and that there be an odd number of players (including the moderator). These specifications avoid tie votes for eliminations and ensure that the game will end dramatically on an elimination rather than anticlimactically with murder as a foregone conclusion.

=== Night ===
Werewolves discussing whom to kill during the night

All players are told to close their eyes. The moderator then instructs all mafiosi to open their eyes and acknowledge their accomplices via tap on the shoulder. The mafiosi pick a "victim" by silently gesturing to indicate their target and to show unanimity then close their eyes again.

A similar process occurs for other roles with nightly actions. In the case of the seer, the moderator may indicate the target's innocence or guilt by using gestures such as nodding or head shaking. Night may be accompanied by players tapping gently to mask sounds made by gesturing.

=== Day ===
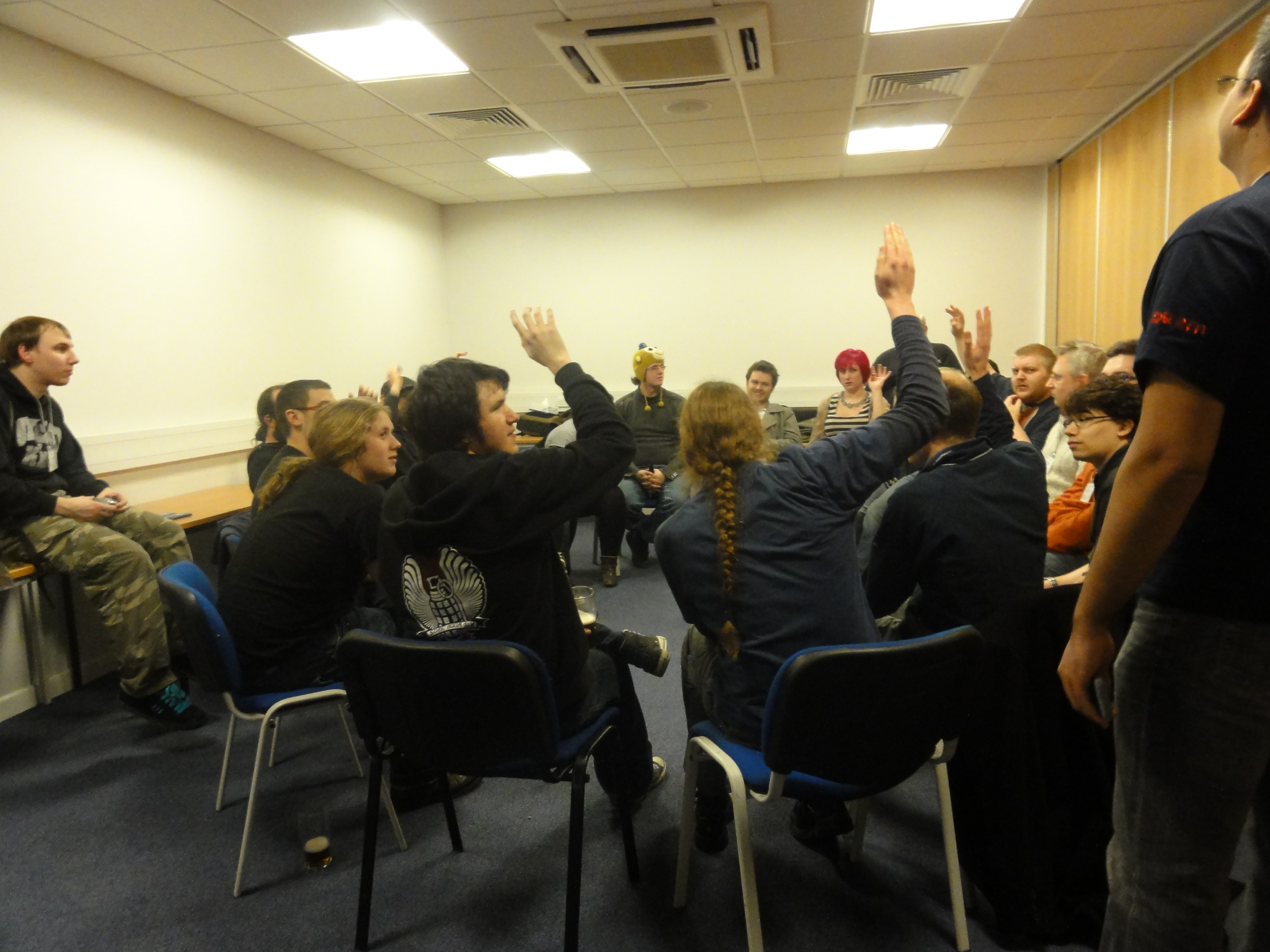
During the "day" phase, players vote on whom to eliminate.

The moderator instructs players to open their eyes and announces who "died" the previous night. Discussion ensues among the living players. At any point, a player may accuse someone of being a mafioso and prompt others to vote to eliminate them. If over half of the players do so, the accused person is eliminated and night begins. Otherwise, the phase continues until an elimination occurs.

According to some rules, the role of dead players should be revealed; according to others, for example, if the protector dies, nobody should know that. In both cases, dead players are not permitted to attempt to influence the remainder of the game.

Because players have more freedom to deliberate, days tend to be longer than nights.

== Game theory ==
=== Mathematical study ===
Mafia is a complicated game to model, so most analyses of optimal play have assumed both (a) that there are only townsfolk and Mafiosi and (b) that the townsfolk never have a probability of identifying the Mafia that is better than chance. Early treatment of the game concentrated on simulation, while more recent studies have tried to derive closed-form equilibrium solutions for perfect play.

In 2006, the computer scientists Braverman, Etesami and Mossel proved that without detectives and with perfect players the randomized strategy is optimal for both citizens and mafia. When there is a large enough number of players, to give both groups similar probability of winning, they showed that the initial number of mafiosi m needs to be proportional to the square root of the total number of players P, that is ${\textstyle m \propto \sqrt{P}}$. With a simulation, they confirmed that 50 mafiosi would have almost a 50% chance to win among 10,000. The Mafia's chance of victory is

$$W(m, P) \approx \frac{m}{\sqrt{P}} ,$$

which is a good approximation when the right hand side is below 40%. If any detectives are added to the game, Braverman et al. proved that the number of Mafiosi must remain at a fixed proportion of the total number of players for their chance of winning to remain constant. (Note: The single detective publishes a large list of innocents, and asks to be lynched to guarantee its veracity (under the standard rules in which the detective's role is revealed after she is killed, no strategic interference from the Mafia is possible): Braverman, M.; Etesami, O.; Mossel, E. (2008). "Mafia: A Theoretical Study of Players and Coalitions in a Partial Information Environment". Annals of Applied Probability. 18 (3): 12. arXiv:math/0609534. Bibcode:2006math......9534B. doi:10.1214/07-aap456. S2CID 14668989.)

In 2008, Erlin Yao derived specific analytical bounds for the mafia's win probability when there are no detectives.

In a paper from 2010, the exact formula for the probability that the mafia wins was found. Moreover, it was shown that the parity of the initial number of players plays an important role. In particular, when the number of mafiosi is fixed and an odd player is added to the game (and ties are resolved by coin flips), the mafia-winning chance do not drop but rise by a factor of approx. $\sqrt{\pi/2}$ (equality in the limit of the infinite number of players).

In 2023, a modification to the strategy of Braverman et al., termed the Modified Braverman Strategy (MBS), was proposed to increase the Mafia's probability of winning. When the numbers of Mafia and citizens are equal and greater than one, the MBS allows the Mafia to coordinate their votes against a predetermined citizen if the randomized resident vote selects a Mafioso, rather than voting to eliminate the selected Mafia member. Under the original Braverman strategy, for $M=C=n$, the Mafia's probability of winning is $1-\frac{1}{2^n}$; under the modified strategy it is $1-\frac{1}{2^{n+1}}$. Thus, within the model, the modified strategy weakly dominates the original strategy. Computer simulations reported in the thesis also produced higher Mafia win probabilities under the MBS than under the original strategy across the game sizes tested, with increases ranging from 1% to 13%.

=== Results in live play ===
In live (or videoconference) real-time play, the innocents typically win more often than game theory suggests. Several reasons for this have been advanced:

- The physiological stress of sustained lying degrades the initial ability of mafioso to deceive the innocents, much more than a model of perfect play would predict, especially if the innocents can get the town emotionally involved in the game's outcome:

If you're trying to feign shock or anger, it's much harder to do over a long period. People accused of something they're trying to hide will start out feigning outrage – 'How dare you ask me that?' But that will start to change to objection rather than shock, as it's psychologically very difficult to mimic emotion.

— Dr Simon Moore, Wired UK

- The information revealed by the mafiosi voting patterns tells against them later in the game. One of the game's fans, Max Ventilla, has said that "If the villagers are allowed to keep a pencil and paper, they always win."
- As players get more experienced, their strategic sophistication and ability to spot and use deception increases. They will typically get better at the skills needed for playing innocents faster, being villagers more often than mafiosi.
- The Metagame aspect: Dimma Davidoff has said past connections will always lose to future collaborations. When playing several Mafia games with the same people, it's more helpful to be known for honesty than for deceit. Davidoff considers that so important that he thinks the advantages of playing the mafioso role honestly outweigh the disadvantages.

Laboratory results have not necessarily shown the same pattern. In a 2023 study in which players were not permitted to communicate, there was no statistically significant difference between observed and theoretically predicted win rates. The Mafia won 43 of 80 games (53.8%), compared with a theoretical win probability of 51.8% ($p=0.407$); excluding one nine-player session, the Mafia won 37 of 70 games (52.9%), compared with a theoretical probability of 49.2% ($p=0.312$).

But the Mafia can win in live play; their best chance of winning occurs when mafioso bond with their innocent neighbours and convince those neighbours to value that bond over dispassionate analysis. The game designers Salen and Zimmerman have written that the deep emergent social game play in Mafia (combined with the fear of elimination) create ideal conditions for this.

== Optional roles ==
These additional roles are named differently in the many versions of Mafia, for thematic flavor, or historical reasons. Also, the same role-name can have differing functions across different versions of the game. What follows is a general list of role types found in Mafia variants; since the specific names vary by milieu it must be non-exhaustive.

=== Investigative roles ===
Players with these roles use their own night-phase to discover something about other players. Though the standard game now includes the basic Detective, these roles are optional, and games can exclude them entirely (such as the stool pigeon variant, or Davidoff's original rules).

==== Investigative roles (standard) ====
Detective, Seer, Commandant, Sheriff, Police, etc.

Allied with the Innocents, the Detective can detect whether a player is a mafioso. They will typically wake up, and point at one person; the Narrator will silently indicate to the Detective whether that player is Mafia or Innocent. In some versions of the game, the Detective's investigation result is announced publicly by the Narrator, for example the Detective found a Mafioso!. More commonly, no announcement is made. As with other roles, which player is the detective is not generally known, leaving anyone the option of pretending to be the Detective.
A Detective is usually included in modern games. For example, somebody is always assigned this role in all commercial card game versions, (Note: As of November 2007, five card-based versions of this game are sold, and all require one player to become a Seer. The "Do you worship Cthulhu Deck Setup". Archived from the original on 27 January 2007. specifies that a Seer card be dealt to someone even with the (minimum) five players. Similarly, the Lupus in Tabula Preparation calls for the Seer card to be dealt to somebody even if the game is played with the minimum number of players (eight). Getting Started with Ultimate Werewolf Role Selection advises that even the introductory game should include the Seer (with further optional roles being added in addition to the seer in later games). Werewolves of Millers hollow uses the Fortune Teller name for the Detective but the role is identical to the standard seer/angel/detective, and is again mandatory, having its own phase of the night in the basic rules. (As does the Seer in Are You a Werewolf? – though it is after the werewolves' phase.)) and almost all internet-based, and most face-to-face games start with at least one detective. (Note: For example, "The Mafia rules (MIT)"., from Massachusetts Institute of Technology, are very simple, and specify roles for 7–20 players, always including at least one Detective. Andrew Plotkin's original Werewolf always includes a Villager (Seer), and he mentions that in 1997 Mafia was played in the National Puzzlers' League convention with a Knight Commandant. (The role of the Knight Commandant or Knight is described in detail as having the standard Detective powers in: "National Puzzlers' League – 1997 Convention Reports". Archived from the original on 8 December 2007.) Plotkin describes Davidoff's original game (which had no Detective) as well off the current average. A rare modern rule-set with No Inspector is: Engstrom, Vegard (1999). "The Game Player Constellations". but only when starting with five, larger groups get at least one inspector.) Multiple detectives either act in separate night phases (unaware of the identities of other detectives) or work together as the police (an association role).
In the online Mafia variant Town of Salem, the Sheriff is a role which can interrogate people at night to discover their possible innocence. Generally, most Town roles appear innocent; and most roles that are considered evil appear suspicious to the Sheriff.

==== Investigative roles (less common) ====
Psychic, Wizard, Fortune Teller, Oracle, Tracker, Watcher, etc.

Psychic, Psychologist, or Sorcerer-type investigators can determine other players' roles, rather than their alignments. Roles which detect other roles are usually implemented in the same way as the Detective's ability to determine alignment. For example: the Psychologist points to a player (at night) for a Thumbs-up from the moderator if the Vigilante is pointed to. (Note: For example, Vigilante in the "Princeton rules".) A Tracker may see what someone's night action was, or the target of their action, while a Watcher may see all those who visited someone at night.
Information revealed to investigators is fallible (in more complicated variants). Online versions can give information with a confidence level, and in other variants the Narrator deceives the Detective by showing all players as Innocent, all as Guilty, giving reversed results, or random information (these can be termed as Naive, Paranoid, Insane, or Random respectively). Additionally, some Alignment roles give immunity to successful investigation. (Note: For example, The Oracle in Werewolf chooses one person to investigate every night, and are shown their card, unless they pick the Master Werewolf – when the Oracle is shown an (innocent) villager card.)
In some games, there are Mafia Detectives, who have the power of a normal detective but are on the Mafia side. The Super Commandant has the standard power of a Detective, while also protecting the investigated from night-time attack.

=== Omniscient roles ===
Witness, Child, Little Girl, etc.

Instead of having to investigate, some innocent roles give complete information on the entire mafia: The witness is told who the mafia are during the first night, while the mafia are not told the witness's identity (differing from the stool pigeon in not being a part of the mafia).
The Little Girl in Werewolf and Werewolves of Miller's Hollow is allowed to secretly peek and watch as the werewolves choose their victim; if discovered doing so by the Werewolves, she dies of fright. (Note: For example, as described on Ultimate Werewolf's Little Girl Card, and in the first non-introductory role suggested by Wired: The Child spies at night when the werewolves are killing, and only when the werewolves are killing, by opening her eyes ever so slightly.)

=== Protective roles ===
Guardian Angel, Doctor, Bodyguard, Hero, Jailer, etc.

Allied with the Innocents, the Doctor-type role defends others at night. (Note: Depending on the variant, they may know the identities of the Mafia, but this isn't required; they usually indicate the player to protect in a separate phase of gameplay (a separate part of the night) than the Mafia's killing phase. The Mafia-Doctor is a mafioso, and a more obscure variant role, with the opposite power (from the Doctor) of protecting the guilty from attack during the day.) Typically, they will awaken at night after the Mafia have gone back to sleep and point at one person to protect; that person will survive any night-time attack. (Note: The protected player gains complete invulnerability during the night they are visited by the Doctor or Bodyguard. The Mafia do not usually know the identity of the protected player, nor get a chance to select another victim, so this attack is wasted if the Mafia target a protected player (e.g., "Bodyguard, Lupus in Tabula". Archived from the original on 24 December 2005.).) They are typically allowed to protect themselves, and are commonly barred from protecting the same target on successive nights. A Guardian Angel can only protect others. The Nurse gains the Doctor's abilities if the Doctor dies. (Note: For example, see the 2+2 rule-set describing the Nurse: "Mafia rules".) The Jailer protects innocents just like the doctor, but also simultaneously blocks their night action. The Firefighter, or the Herbalist can protect from some night-time attacks but not others (in Werewolf, for example, they choose one person to protect with wolfsbane, but that person may still be killed by the Serial Killer). Other games limit this ability to a certain number of times. (Note: For example, the Witch in Werewolves of Miller's Hollow has only one use of her protective potion. She is allowed to see who was killed by the werewolves before applying the protective potion, so this character is more typical of the reanimation than the protective type.)
Bodyguard-type roles sacrifice themselves to prevent (and sometimes kill the corresponding attacker) a single attack on a player.

=== Killing roles ===
Vigilante, Veteran, Hunter, Bomb, Woodcutter, etc.

Aside from Mafia, Werewolves, and Serial Killers (solitary guilty parties), the Innocents may have some roles with the ability to kill at night. The Vigilante is an innocent who kills every night, in their own night-time phase sometimes. (Note: "Do you worship Cthulu Roles and Quick Reference Script". Archived from the original on 25 May 2010.. This makes the vigilante as lethal as the entire Mafia, potentially overbalancing the game, which has led to the introduction of roles that limit his effectiveness, such as the Walrus role-blocker.) In some variations, the Vigilante has limited ammunition. Some variations introduce a time limit of two nights before the player in the Killing Role can kill again. Other variations add the trait that if the Vigilante kills an innocent they either lose the ability to kill or die from guilt the next night. The Veteran has a finite-use ability (usually 3); if activated, anyone who targets them (friend or foe) will be killed. The Bomb may only trigger if targeted at night (not necessarily for death) by another role. Variants exist where this person can kill during the daytime cycle (e.g., the Terrorist / Gravedigger), sometimes only if executed during the daytime. The Woodcutter or Hunter can take one other person with them whenever they die. (Note: The Hunter appears in Werewolves of Miller's Hollow, for example. The Woodcutter is a (less common) equivalent name for the role. Wired recommends including the hunter in even the most basic games: "Original Werewolf characters". Wired UK. January 2010.)

=== Alignment roles ===
Miller, Godfather, Alpha Wolf, Wildcard, etc.

Some roles can fool investigations to determine their alignments: the Miller is an Innocent who appears guilty (usually because they are an outsider); the Godfather, on the other hand, appears innocent despite being the Mafia leader. (Note: The Godfather role is played differently between variants. If immunity to detection is the Godfather's only power, his leadership of the Mafia need only be nominal: "Name: Godfather". Archived from the original on 27 February 2007.) The Alpha Wolf or Master Werewolf have the same role as the Godfather in Werewolf settings.

=== Double-agent roles ===
Traitor, Possessed, Undercover Cop, Godfather, etc.

The Traitor is not a mafioso (in that he does not awake at night and is not revealed as a mafioso by Detective type roles), but works to protect them and hamper the town during the day cycle, and wins only with a Mafia victory. Conversely, the Undercover Cop is a mole within the Mafia group who acts with the Mafia but wins with the innocents. The stool pigeon may be the only optional role in play, and must inform villagers of the mafia while appearing as mafiosi; it makes up one of the few modern game forms to be played without an investigative role.
Distinct from the alignment-role Godfather, the double-agent Godfather behaves as a standard mafioso, but wakes again (after the Mafia sleep) to perform an extra kill. This Godfather-role wins only if he survives.

=== Role manipulators ===
Role-blocker, Bus Driver, Thief, Barman, Witch, etc.

These roles can stop or alter the night actions of others; for instance, they may prevent a protection or investigation from occurring, or they may change the target. The Role-blocker can block the Vigilante for a night, while the Thief, Prostitute or Hypnotizer might be able to disable the powers of any selected target. (Note: The thief's action usually applies for a single night, as in: "Mafia Game: IRC Version". Archived from the original on 15 December 2007.. The thief sometimes has a purely investigative function – being only able to determine the roles from stolen items."Thief". Archived from the original on 27 February 2007.)
When the thief is used in Werewolves, an additional townsfolk card is added before dealing, and the Thief may choose on the first night to steal the role of another player or to take the unused role card. The player whose role was stolen gets the unused role card and the Thief card is discarded.
Rerouting-type roles, such as those in Town of Salem (like the Witch and Transporter), may control the visiting target of a player.

=== Recruitment roles ===
Godfather, Psychiatrist, Piper, Cult Leader, etc.

The Mafia Godfather may be able to recruit innocent players into their faction under certain circumstances. The Yakuza is a regular mafia player with an extra power: they may sacrifice themselves from the second night (during the night) and choose an innocent to join the mafia. (Note: Bennet, J. "Mafia: Advanced rules" (PDF). Archived from the original (PDF) on 10 August 2011. In other variants, the mafia can't kill anyone else on the night this power is used. The potential existence of a Yakuza makes innocents with protective roles less inclined to reveal their roles for fear of being converted (or more inclined to reveal themselves if they expect the Mafia to win and wish to be converted).) Vampires may convert selected players (usually innocents only, to prevent evil factions from exposing converted among them) to other Vampires.
Each night, the scientist selects a player to cure; if a mafioso is cured, they awaken as an innocent. The Psychiatrist is an innocent with the ability to convert the Serial Killer into a normal innocent.
Cult Leaders recruit followers at night instead of kill; they act as an independent faction, usually with the ability to talk at night.
The Piper wins by charming every surviving player; she charms players at night, who then know each other (but not the piper) but are otherwise unaffected.

=== Association roles ===
Freemasons (Masons), Siblings, Lovers, Police, etc.

Possessors of these roles know one another and what their roles are. On the innocent's side, a Mason usually has no special abilities, but knows the identity of all other Masons and that all Masons are also innocent. Every member of the detectives or the police knows all the rest, because they collaborate at night to investigate someone (sharing the powers of the Detective role between them).
Sibling pairs typically consist of one Mafia and one Innocent; in most versions, if one is killed, the other also dies. Cupid in Werewolf chooses a pair of Lovers on the first night. In this variant, the Lovers can also win the game (regardless of whether they are Mafia, Innocents, or both) by being the last two standing. Like Siblings, however, if one of the pair dies, the other dies as well.
In a modded variation of the game Town of Salem, the Jackal is a role that is given two recruits from normally opposing factions at the start of the game, and has to win with them both of them together as a single faction, knowing who they are. The recruits do not know the Jackal, but know each other, and cannot communicate with each other or the Jackal at night.

=== Election roles ===
Doublevoter, Priest, Rabble Rouser, Lawyer, etc.

Until the Rabble Rouser dies there are two eliminations per day.
In some games there are players who can change the vote count. Some players have 2 votes (Doublevoter); some players can only cast the final vote to kill a player (Actor); cannot vote to eliminate (Voteless Innocent); must delegate someone else to vote for them (Fool), or require one fewer vote to eliminate (Hated Innocent). The Priest cannot place the final vote (this role is not necessarily the same as the Reanimation-role priest). The lawyer selects someone during the night, and if that person tops the elimination vote the next day, saves them (a different lawyer role releases the wills written by players killed up to that point, when she dies). The Monarch is a role in Town of Salem 2 which can grant extra voting power to any player of their choice, twice per game.

=== Public roles ===
Mayor, Judge, Sheriff, President, etc.

This role is taken in addition to the assigned role, and it endows the player with additional, overt, powers (particularly during the daytime). Empowerment can be random, but is usually made by vote. For instance, the Mayor or Sheriff can be elected each morning, and gain two elimination votes, or a Judge could moderate discussion in parliamentary fashion (to the advantage of their team). The elected President has the sole elimination vote.

=== Handicapped roles ===
Drunk, Village Idiot, Teenage Werewolf, etc.

This may be a secondary role, taken in addition to the assigned role. However, it has the opposite effect, giving the bearer a handicap, like speaking only gibberish in the case of the Village Drunk, etc.
Alternatively, it may be a standard role with a particular constraint, such as the teenage werewolf who must say the word werewolf at least once each day.

=== Handicapper roles ===
Silencer, Dentist, Prostitute, Fog, etc.

The Dentist may select any other player at night, and prevent them speaking during the following day. The Silencer is a mafioso with the identical power, except that they may not silence the same player on successive days. The silenced individual wakes in the morning and is immediately instructed not to talk until the end of the day. They can still raise their hand to vote in live games (although, if they were silenced by a prostitute, they are not allowed to vote).

=== Post-mortem roles ===
Dark Background, Priest, Medium, Coroner, etc.

The dark background roles are standard (mafia or innocent) except for revealing a deceptive alignment when killed. The M.E. gathers information from the killings that can help the innocents, while the Priest learns about the alignment of the dead in the same way that the Detective learns about the living. The Medium can interrogate dead players. (Note: The Medium function varies, for example see summarized 'Medium-enabled seance' rules from Werewolf at: "boredgamegeeks". 8 September 2005., as opposed to the Lupus in Tabula Medium, who alone can uncover the alignment of the deceased (see: "Lupus in Tabula (English rules) Special Characters".).) While the coroner survives, the narrator will explain the means of death in all night kills. In the games Town of Salem and Town of Salem 2, the Jester is a Neutral role that may kill once after being voted out.

=== Reanimation roles ===
Reviver, Governor, Martyr, Witch, etc.

Revivers and Master Revivers are able to resurrect dead players, Master Revivers can bring the revived into their association (e.g., the Masons: see Association roles). The players resurrected by a Necromancer are converted to the Necromancer's alignment; those revived by the voodooist join a separate zombie group. The Governor can reprieve those killed during the daytime, as can the Martyr if he sacrifices himself. The Witch has a (single-use) revival potion. At night, she's shown who will die in the morning, and can choose to save them. (Note: The Witch was introduced as a special character in The Werewolves of Millers Hollow, where she also has a single-use killing potion. She may be able to revive herself with the "reanimation potion", see: Original Werewolf characters)

=== Rule-immune roles ===
Bulletproof, Oracle, Elder, etc.

The Bulletproof innocent has invulnerability at night, (Note: The bulletproof effect typically applies to night-time killings and is usually temporary, for example, the Ultimate Werewolf Amulet of Protection (bulletproof vest equivalent) protects over only a single night. Rare optional roles do give permanent protection from mafia attack, such as the Lupus in Tabula Werehamster) though usually with limits; for example, the Elder will survive the first night attack, but not the second.
The Oracle has an investigative role similar to a Seer but also has the power to talk when inactive (talking in a sleep phase is usually a rule infraction).
The games Town of Salem and Town of Salem 2 rely on a system consisting of several levels of night immunity and attack. Lynching (or voting out) is considered to surpass all night immunity.

=== Special roles ===
Baker, chef, Village Idiot, Cobbler, etc.

The baker is on the side of the innocents. During the night, the baker gives one player a loaf of bread, potentially revealing their identity. If the baker dies, the innocents have just three nights to dispose of the mafia, or the innocents starve, and the mafia win. The Cobbler, Villager, or Jester has the objective of convincing the town to kill them, or is required to vote in favor of all proposed eliminations. Sometimes, successful elimination of the Village Idiot results in the mafia being able to kill two people that night.

=== Complicated roles ===
Additional variations exist, sometimes with even more specialized or complicated abilities. There are many special roles, and many moderators design novel roles for each game. Some commercial variants ship with blank cards to allow this customization. For example, neutral factions such as the serial killer could exist (the serial killer would have to kill everyone, innocent or mafia, to win).

== Variations ==
The naming of various roles, factions, and other elements of play is theme-dependent and has limitless variation. Common alternative themes restyle the mafia as werewolves, cultists, assassins, or witches, with other roles being renamed appropriately.

Over the years, players have created Mafia variants that include additional rules. Some of these are listed here.

=== Thing variant ===
In the variant called "Thing", the antagonists are Things, shape-shifting aliens that can turn humans into other Things.

=== Variations on the win conditions ===
If there are as many mafiosi as innocents in the day-phase then a mafia victory is declared immediately, under the original Mafia rules. With the ability to deny a majority at an elimination vote, remaining mafiosi cannot be eliminated unless innocent/neutral killing roles exist. Other variants suspend this rule, and only declare the game after every member of one faction has been eliminated: this makes the game easier to explain, and to run.

=== Election variants ===
Nominees for elimination may be allowed to make a speech in their own defense. Usually, each player must vote, can only vote once and cannot vote for themselves. But some variants have a more complicated process of selecting players to be executed. Davidoff's original 'Mafia' allowed multiple day-time executions (per day), each needing only a plurality to action.

Voting variants abound, but any elimination usually requires an absolute majority of the electorate, or votes cast. So the voting is usually not by secret ballot for multiple candidates with the highest vote count eliminated; it is more usual for the voting to be openly resolved either by:

- A nomination or series of elections structured to ultimately offer a choice between two candidates, or
- An option to eliminate (or not eliminate) one suspect (with a new suspect produced if the last one survives the vote).

==== Tied votes ====
Deadlocked elections can be resolved by lot or by killing the player with the scapegoat special role.

The special case of one mafioso and one innocent remaining can be decided randomly or be ruled a Mafia win—this is more usual in live play.

==== Optional elimination variant ====
The Innocents can choose not to kill anybody during the day. Although commonly unsure of Mafia identities, the Innocents are more likely to randomly kill a mafioso than are the Mafia (at night). Therefore, not eliminating anyone (even at random) will typically favor the Mafia.

However, when the number of survivors is even, No Kill may help the Innocents; for example, when three Innocents and one mafioso remain – voting for No elimination gives a 1/3 chance of killing the mafioso the next day, rather than a 1/4 chance today (assuming random elimination).

=== Mafia killing methods ===
Some variants require all Mafia members to choose the same victim independently for a kill to succeed. This can be achieved in the following ways:

- By waking the Mafia members up separately.
- By calling out the names of all surviving players and requiring surviving mafiosi to raise their hands when the name of the victim is called out. In this variant, the mafiosi only "wake up" (open their eyes) at the very beginning of the game when they identify each other. This variant also allows other roles to take their actions by simply raising their hands when their target's name is called out.
- By having them write their kills. Under this variant, Innocent players write the word 'honest' on a piece of paper; Mafia members write the name of a player for elimination. If all the mafia notes have the same name on them, that player is considered killed by the Mafia.

In some online versions of the game, a particular player (the Godfather or a designated mafioso) must send in the kill.

Another variant requires the night-time vote to be secret and unanimous, but allows multiple players to be added to the execution queue to ensure unanimity.

=== Multiple families ===
Multiple, independent groups of mafia or werewolves act and win independently, giving faster game-play and the potential for cross-fire between the factions.

=== Attributes ===
In this variant, players are given two cards: the first contains their role, the second an attribute. Attributes were originally derived from roles that could apply to both Mafia and Innocent alignments such as Bulletproof (cannot be killed at night), Mayor (has two votes in the elimination), and Siamese Twins (more commonly known as Siblings or Lovers).

=== Quantum Werewolf ===
This variant was developed by Steven Irrgang and used for a puzzle in the 2008 CISRA Puzzle Competition. The difference from a standard game of Mafia is that players are not initially assigned roles, but rather on each day are given the probabilities describing the game's current quantum state. Each player with a non-zero probability of being a seer or a werewolf performs the appropriate night actions (which may not be effective if it is later determined that the player did not have that role). When a player is killed, the wave function collapses and the players are given updated probabilities.

=== Train Mafia ===
Traditional Mafia re-envisioned and heavily modified by the Copenhagen Game Collective to be played in a subway metro. In this variation, players who are eliminated are kicked off the train (at the next stop), and must wait in shame for the following train – a kind of 'afterlife' train – to join a second, interwoven game.

=== Invisible City: Rebels vs. Spies ===
A location-based mobile gaming variant for Android, designed for city center play. The two factions are: the Rebels, the majority; and the Spies, the informed minority. The rule-set replaces expulsions with scoring by round. Each player is assigned an individual mission each round. Some missions are critical and if one of those fails, the round goes to the Spies, but only one player knows which missions are critical.

=== Ultimate Werewolf ===
In this version of Mafia, the main enemies are the werewolves, as opposed to the mafia. The werewolves wake at night to kill a player, who is usually a Villager. Other helpful roles such as the Seer, Bodyguard, and Witch exist to help purge the village of werewolves, but other neutral roles exist such as the Tanner, lovers (if Cupid is in the game and the lovers are from different teams), and a third major faction: Vampires.

==== One Night variant ====
In this standalone game published by Bezier Games, players only "sleep" and close their eyes for a single night at the beginning of the game. They then have a single day of discussion, with a single elimination. No players are eliminated as the game progresses. There is no moderator, so everyone gets to participate as a member of the town or village. When playing this game, three more role cards are used than the number of players; when everyone is randomly dealt out their card the three extra ones placed in the middle of the table. To begin the game one of the players, with eyes closed, will act as the "caller" on the single starting night, going through the nighttime roles once: Werewolves and Minions (if in play) will identify each other, the Seer will examine one player's card or two of the middle cards, the Robber will steal another player's role card and replace it with their own, the Troublemaker will blindly swap two players' role cards, the Insomniac wakes up to check if their role card has been swapped, etc. The game ends on a single elimination vote, with the villagers winning if a single werewolf is caught, and the werewolves winning if no werewolves are killed. This game can be played with as few as three players. Play time can be as quick as five minutes per game.

=== Town of Salem ===
Town of Salem is an advanced online version of Mafia that takes place during the Salem witch trials. It involves several different roles from multiple factions. The game was updated on 6 June 2017, to add a new faction: the Coven, which mainly consists of witches and is similar in function and goal to the more traditional Mafia.

A sequel to the game, Town of Salem 2, was released on 26 May 2023, for release on Steam. The game removes the Mafia faction, but repurposes the function of most roles within the Mafia into the Coven. Gameplay remains similar to the original game.

== Online play ==
Online gameplay at Mark Kirschstein's https://werewolv.es server

Mafia can also be played online. Games can be played on IRC channels, where a bot assumes the role of a game moderator and the interaction of players is conducted via textual communication.

== Artificial intelligence ==
Werewolf is a subject of artificial intelligence research due to its unique features such as persuasion and deception. The game requires several AI technologies such as multi-agent coordination, intentional reading, and understanding of the theory of mind.

Deep learning has been used in an attempt to develop agents that can win the game as werewolves or as villagers. Regular expressions have been used to parse utterance logs for divulgence (or "coming-out" as a role) and decision information, although one difficulty has been that a statement such as "Player A is a werewolf" could be based on either the player's ability (e.g. as seer) or just speculation.

== See also ==
- Mafia: The Game of Survival (2016), Russian science fiction action film inspired by the game.
- The Werewolves of Millers Hollow
- Among Us
- Assassin
- Gnosia
- Bang! (card game)
- The Resistance (game)
- The Traitors, a reality game show franchise with multiple international editions, in which the game format resembles Mafia.
- Secret Hitler
- Town of Salem
- Wink murder - an earlier game involving the attempt by innocent players to unmask a murderer hidden in their midst.
- Werewolves Within
- Blood on the Clocktower
