= West by Sea: A Treasure Hunt That Spans the Globe =

2016 book by Michelle Beale and Edward Beale

- Authors: Michelle Beale and Edward Beale
- Cover artist: Edward K. Beale
- Language: English
- Genre: Travel
- Publisher: Expeditionaire
- Publication date: February 2016
- Publication place: United States
- Media type: Print (Paperback)
- Pages: 144
- ISBN: 978-0-692-38310-0

West by Sea is an armchair treasure hunt book in the form of a travel journal. It was written by Michelle M. B. Beale, designed by Edward K. Beale, and published in February 2016. It contains concealed clues to the location of a hidden object.

== Summary ==
West by Sea is a travelogue written by a brain cancer survivor about 105 days spent circumnavigating the globe by ship. Each page describes one day of the journey, and includes two photographs, the daily position and weather, and a quote. Written in first person present tense, the story is a chronological narrative account. The narrative about the voyage includes stops at 40 ports in 28 countries on 6 continents, starting and ending in Sydney, Australia.

Major ports in chronological order include:

- Day 1: Sydney, Australia
- Day 3: Brisbane, Australia
- Day 12: Singapore
- Day 13: Kuala Lumpur, Malaysia
- Day 14: Langkawi, Malaysia
- Day 19: Mumbai, India
- Day 20: Agra, India
- Day 21: New Delhi, India
- Day 22: Dubai, United Arab Emirates
- Day 28: Luxor, Egypt
- Day 29: Petra, Jordan
- Day 31: Suez Canal transit
- Day 32: Masada, Israel, Dead Sea
- Day 34: Athens, Greece
- Day 35: Mytilene, Greece
- Day 36: Istanbul, Turkey
- Day 37: Anzac Cove
- Day 39: Naples, Italy and Pompeii
- Day 40: Rome, Italy and Vatican City
- Day 41: Pisa and Florence, Italy
- Day 42: Monte Carlo, Monaco
- Day 43: Barcelona, Spain
- Day 45: Seville, Spain
- Day 46: Lisbon, Portugal
- Day 49: Cobh, Ireland
- Day 50: Dublin, Ireland
- Day 51: Glasgow, Scotland, United Kingdom
- Day 53: Le Havre, France
- Day 54: Dover, England
- Day 55: Amsterdam, Netherlands
- Day 57: Copenhagen, Denmark
- Day 58: Oslo, Norway
- Day 60: Tórshavn, Faroe Islands
- Day 67: New York City, United States
- Day 72: Oranjestad, Aruba
- Day 73: Willemstad, Curacao
- Day 75: Panama Canal transit
- Day 77: Puntarenas, Costa Rica
- Day 83: Los Angeles, United States
- Day 88: Hilo, Hawaiian Islands
- Day 89: Honolulu, Hawaiian Islands
- Day 90: Nawiliwili, Hawaiian Islands
- Day 96: Pago Pago, American Samoa
- Day 98: Suva, Fiji
- Day 101: Auckland, New Zealand
- Day 102: Bay of Islands, New Zealand
- Day 105: Sydney, Australia

== Prerelease development ==
The book started as a project on Kickstarter to help maintain a blog via satellite from the ship. The campaign generated over $10,000US from 153 backers on four continents.

== Awards and recognition ==
- Finalist, Best Interior Design - USA Best Books Awards, 4 December 2016
- First Place, Travel category - Reader Views Literary Awards 2016-2017, 10 March 2017
- Finalist, Travel category - 2016 Foreword INDIES Awards, 15 March 2017
- Nominee, Travel and Memoir categories - 2017 Independent Publisher IPPY Award, 1 April 2017

== Select bibliography ==
- Michelle Beale, West By Sea, Mystic: Expeditionaire, 2016 (ISBN 978-0-692-38310-0)

== See also ==
- Masquerade, a 1979 children's book by Kit Williams that sparked a worldwide treasure hunt
- The Merlin Mystery, a treasure hunt book from 1998
- Treasure: In Search of the Golden Horse
