= On the Trail of the Golden Owl =

1993 armchair treasure hunt book by Max Valentin

On The Trail Of The Golden Owl
- First edition cover
- Authors: Max Valentin
- Original title: Sur la trace de la chouette d'or
- Illustrator: Michel Becker
- Language: French
- Subject: Armchair treasure hunt
- Published: 1993
- Publisher: Manya Levallois-Perret
- Publication place: France
- Pages: 46
- ISBN: 9782878960679
- OCLC: 494006209

On The Trail Of The Golden Owl (French: Sur la trace de la chouette d'or) is a French armchair treasure hunt book created by communications expert Régis Hauser under the pseudonym "Max Valentin" and illustrated by artist Michel Becker. Launched in 1993, the statue was discovered on October 3, 2024, making it the second longest treasure hunt ever organized (after The Secret). The Chouette d'Or was the longest running treasure hunt with a single prize, while 3 of the Secret's 12 prizes have been found.

A new edition of On The Trail Of The Golden Owl written by Michel Becker was published in December 2019, called The Secret Notebooks (4th edition 2019).

In 2021 Michel Becker became the official organiser of the treasure hunt, obtaining the sealed envelope containing the hunt solution from the family of Régis Hauser. Becker journeyed with a legal bailiff to check that the owl prize was still buried at the location revealed in the solution. He reported that when he dug at the spot he found the bronze owl (a duplicate to be exchanged for the real golden owl) missing and instead found a rusty iron bird, speculated to be a replacement left by Hauser. He replaced this rusty bird with a new bronze owl so that the treasure hunt could continue. Becker published clarified game rules and published a 5th edition of the clue book, On the trail of the Golden Owl – Under the seal of secrecy in August 2022.

Launched in 1993, it ended on October 3, 2024, making it the second longest treasure hunt ever organized, after The Secret. This longevity gives it an "almost mythical aura" among fans of the genre. The solutions were revealed in a documentary screening in French cinemas on May 2, 2025, and confirmed the owl was buried near the Borne Saint-Martin stone circle in the commune of Dabo, in the Moselle department in Grand Est in north-eastern France.

== Origins ==
On The Trail Of The Golden Owl was Max Valentin's first treasure hunt. He came up with the idea for the puzzle in the late 1970s, and spent 450 hours designing eleven textual riddles, which together hold the clues to a final location and a cache, hidden somewhere in France.

Michel Becker created eleven paintings for the book, as well as the final prize, the Golden Owl statuette. The statuette is 10 inches (25 cm) high and 20 inches (50 cm) wide, and weighs 33 lbs (15 kg). It is entirely made of gold and silver, with diamonds on the head. In 1993, the owl was estimated at more than 1 million francs (equivalent to €250,000 in 2025). A legal protector holds it in Paris. Becker also created a replica made of bronze, which was buried somewhere in France by Hauser on the night of 23 April 1993. The treasure hunt was launched on 15 May 1993.

Valentin designed the hunt to last for a few months and to be solvable by experts or amateurs, insisting that "If all the searchers put all their knowledge together, the owl would be found in....two hours". Valentin also included false trails in the riddles, which he admitted was normal in treasure hunt games, but which he later regretted putting too much work into. He estimated that the hunt would last between four months and a year. Several copies in bronze and iron of the owl were later made.

Valentin later created more than twenty other treasure hunts, all of which have been resolved.

== Riddles ==
The book consists of eleven double-page spreads, each of which is a discrete riddle composed of a title, text, and a painting. Each pair of pages is numbered with a wavelength associated with its colours, and with an owl face.

| Page number | O^{1} order | B^{2} order | Title and text | Meaning |
|---|---|---|---|---|
| 500 | 1 | 7 | UT QUEANT LAXIS; At 2424-42-424-44-224-24-42-24, take the orthogonal. To find the Spiral with four centers, 560.606 measures, it's far. But by the Mega, it's a million times less. | A spiral Applying time signature to the numbers, "reversing" each sequence, and treating the sequence as morse code reveals ▄▄▄ ▄ ▄▄▄ ▄ (C) ▄ ▄▄▄ (A) ▄ ▄▄▄ ▄ (R) ▄ ▄ (I) ▄▄▄ ▄▄▄ ▄ (G) ▄▄▄ ▄ (N) ▄ ▄▄▄ (A) ▄▄▄ ▄ (N), the word Carignan, a French city. The reference to finding, or drawing, a spiral has not yet been decoded. See also Ut queant laxis The word orthogonal may mean to draw a second line with a given angle after the first line. The repeated sequence 60606 in the given measures is the mark of a division from a round number due to unit conversion, the unit being given in a previous riddle. It would be 185 in usual unit. Measuring this distance on a Michelin map would give the given village. |
| 530 | 2 | 2 | OPENING; My first, first half of the half of the first age, Precedes my Second and Third, seeking their way. My Fourth is inspired, my Fifth is in rage, But, without protest, follows my Fourth and the roman alpha. My Sixth is hidden at the limits of ETERNITY. My Seventh, standing, spits his venom. To find my all, just to be wise, Because the Truth, in truth, will not be a Devin's affair. | The riddle identifies the starting city of the game, Bourges. (B/baby)(OU/où)(R/air)(G/in rage)(E/start and end letter of ETERNITE)(S/SssS) It is the first city provided as starting point. |
| 780 | 3 | 3 | FIRST STEP... Wherever you want, By the ross and the coachman. But where you have to, By the compass and the foot. | This riddle is unsolved. Valentin gave hints, but no answer has been identified. He once described this as the second-most important riddle of the game.This gives the unit of measure: 33 centimeters. |
| 600 | 4 | 6 | WHEN AL-MAR ALLIES TO PRAENESTE FIBULA, DARKNESS SHINE; BDI,J. DF,F. CFD. BJ. HJ. EA,B. BC. E. DC,B. CDI,B. BAB,H. BE. CD. FB. BCG,J. BIG,D. BE. BG. BJD,B. DB. BGH,C. BC. E. | Al-mar is an ancient word for Arabs, implying numerals, and the Praeneste fibula implies letters - so numbers should unite with letters. If the reader applies the rule A=0 to the letters, he or she gets numbers which can be treated as atomic masses. 138,9.(La) 35,5.(Cl) 253.(Es) 19.(F) 79.(Se) 40,1.(Ca) 12.(C) 4.(He) 32,1.(S); 238,1.(U) 101,7.(Ru) 14.(N) 23.(Na) 51.(V) 126,9.(I) 186,3.(Re) 14.(N); 16.(O) 193,1.(Ir) 31.(P) 167,2.(Er); 12.(C) 4.(He) The symbols for the elements indicated form the sentence "La cléf se cache sur un navire noir perche" meaning "The Key is on the Black Perched Ship". The meaning of this phrase is unknown. Valentin gave clues, including an anagram implying that the illustration means "Becalmed Nave", associated with the "Black Perched Ship". |
| B | 5 | 1 | THERE IS NO WORSE BLIND PEOPLE THAN THE ONE THAT DOES NOT WANT TO SEE; 1 = 530; 3 = 470; 5 = 600; 7 = 420; 9 = 650 | This is the only riddle that does not have a wavelength as its page number. Applying the colours/marks of the other riddles to a colour wheel and looking for the complementary colour gives the "B order" of the ten wavelength riddles: B-530-780-470-580-600-500-420-560-650-520. If the eleven riddles are resolved in this order, new links appear which may point to the final zone. |
| 420 | 6 | 8 | FROM THE SKY COMES THE LIGHT (the translated text is encrypted with the original method); 365-HI-10752 I-10752 WHERE 365-HE EAGLE; 90677-RI-60140-365-ED 365-HE; 687-ARK OF HI-10752 CLAW-10752; I-60140 365-HE 10752-ABLE, O-60140-E H-30667-60140-DRED DAY-10752 BEFORE; BREAKI-60140-G HI-10752 BEAK; A-60140-D LOO-10752-I-60140-G HI-10752; FEA-365-HER-10752 Then lend a bow to Apollo: from this point, he will count 1969.697 measures towards the zenith. In a fraction of a 46,241,860th of a sidereal day, his line will fall. Hasten to find the arrow. | The numbers are planets' revolutions, and the first letters of the planets are the missing elements of the text. The completed text is This is where the eagle printed the mark of his claws in the sable, one hundred days before breaking his beak and losing his feathers, meaning Golfe Juan, the city where Napoleon returned from exile. The second part is still unsolved. The direction of Apollo's arrow is presumed to be important. Valentin corrected some theories from hunters, and clarified the action of Apollo. (Note: It may express a meridian distance from Golfe-Juan to Dabo in an unknown unit.) The repeated sequence 969697 in the given measures is the mark of a division from a round number due to unit conversion, the unit being given in a previous riddle. It would be 650 in usual unit, toward the sky. The other number being a distance |
| 520 | 7 | 11 | EARTH OPENS; Between them, there would be only two intervals if they were aligned. But this would be a too easy game! Now that you have undone all the yarns, Doubt is the last torment that will be inflicted to you. Because it is the rule of this cruel game: Alone, you have to find where to land your shovel. Show your respect for Mother Nature, And before getting away, close its injury. | This may be the last step, using the computed distance and alignment. This text is relatively straightforward: the treasure-hunter finds something in the zone, and can start to dig. If a hunter understands it correctly, he or she can find the buried owl. |
| 650 | 8 | 10 | WHEN ALL IS REVEALED; Back to the Ponant, seeks the Sentinels. At 8000 measures from there, they are waiting for you. Find them, you need to review them. (also the picture displays the number 71721075) | This text remains cryptic; some treasure-hunters consider the "Sentinels" to refer to one of the last steps, since the treasure-hunters have to "review" them (presumably in the physical final zone). Some people consider the 8000 distance is the distance to a stone marking since XVIII century an administrative limit between two territories. Here an implicit operation may be done to obtain an accurate distance. The subtraction should be done between visible number and number of the table, giving a distance in the specific unit. |
| 470 | 9 | 4 | IT'S THE RIGHT WAY IF THE ARROW TARGETS THE HEART; My First multiplies by gaiety. My Second offers you space, My Third air, and my Fourth water. When he's lying, my Fifth snores. My Sixth is worth one hundred, and my Seventh is just one node. My Eighth tastes like laurel, While my Ninth, with astonishment, stays behind. My Tenth is always naked when there's a link. My Eleventh, finally, is the unknown. Found my all, and through the opening, you will see the light | A simple word game. The solution is another city, Roncevaux. (A/haha)( /space)(R/air)(O/eau)(N/lying ZZz)(C/Latin number)(E/noeud)(V/victory)(A/aah)(U/French grammatical rule)(X/the unknown) It is the second city provided. With the starting point it allows to draw a first line. |
| 560 | 10 | 9 | AD AUGUSTA PER ANGUSTA; When at Carusburc, you will have Albion in the back, Seek the opening that reveals the Heavenly Light. Don't linger, don't ask for your rest, But prepare yourself to walk on water. Twice, Neptune will help you And carry you away from the icy north. Pursue your road and do not interrupt your journey Before seeing, through the Opening, the becalmed Nave. Without deviating an inch, draw a line, And you will not regret what you did. | The only riddle that requires the treasure-hunter to have several elements from other riddles. The treasure-hunter is told to do something from Cherbourg (old name Carasburc), by passing Bourges (opening), to find the Becalmed Nave. This riddle is only partially understood, but is presumed to be very important because it may point to the final zone – the "Becalmed Nave" being a reference to 600 and a special feature of the map. |
| 580 | 11 | 5 | THE GOOD WAY, IT IS THE WAY OF THE OPPOSITE WAY, AND VICE VERSA; 19.9.13.12.15.19.18.21.15.9.19 will be worth 1; 12.15.19.18.21.15.9.19.18.9.13.8.15.4 will be worth 2; 9.13.16.16.9.13.9.5.18 will be worth 3; 25.1.12.14.18.9.13.16.9.13 will be worth 4; 8.15.4.1.12.9.19.18.15.1.6 will be worth 5; 18.9.13.13.5.18.18.1.12.18.9.13.12.15.19 will be worth 6; 20.18.21.15.15.4.9.18.9.13.8 will be worth 7; 9.13.18.9.15.19.19.9 will be worth 8; 15.4.1.12.14.18.1.12.10 will be worth 9; 19.18.9.13.12.15.19.14.1.12 will be worth 0 | This riddle requires a three-stage decryption. First, by converting the numbers into letters, then, by reversing them, and finally, by applying the letter notation code to the Solfège code. 1.12 -> LA -> A 9.19 -> SI -> B 15.4 -> DO -> C 5.18 -> RE -> D 9.13 -> MI -> E 1.6 -> FA -> F 12.15.19 -> SOL -> G For instance, 25.1.12.14.18.9.13.16.9.13 reads 25=Y.(LA>A).14=N.18=R.(MI>E).16=P.(MI>E) The solution consists of the names of ten cities - Bourges, Cherbourg, Dieppe, Épernay, Forbach, Gerardmer, Héricourt, Issoire, Jarnac, and Angers - associated with ten numbers. The final key is A=0 B=1 etc., which is used in the following riddle. |

Notes

1. Original Order, as published: 500, 530, 780, 600, B, 420, 520, 650, 470, 560, and 580.
2. B Order, by solving the B riddle: B, 530, 780, 470, 580, 600, 500, 420, 560, 650, and 520.

== Additional clues ==
After releasing the book, Max Valentin gave some general clues about the game. These clues were often short riddles, or plays on words. Some of the clues were refutations; readers were looking for the owl in erroneous places such as Mont Saint-Michel and at Notre-Dame de Paris, and Valentin felt the need to publicly dismiss these solutions. He also published new clues, in the form of two cards – one global, one precise – that lead to the final zone and the buried owl. He also said that the owl was not on an island, and that it is buried at least 100 kilometers (62 miles) inland.

On 3 June 1993, Valentin created a Minitel server, 'MaxVal', in order to answer public questions about the game. During the following eight-year period, he answered nearly 100,000 questions. The subjects were various, and Valentin detailed many parts of the game, including the elements of the final zone, and the techniques needed to interpret the eleven riddles. Valentin closed the server on 13 December 2001, commenting that it had represented the highest level of "intelligence per square centimetre" in France.

Three specific techniques were confirmed by Valentin before his death:

- The use of maps. The reader must do something with a map, to reveal the final zone of the game, then use a precise map of that zone to find the cache that contains the owl.
- The existence of a "mega trick", which is the key to using the sequence of eleven riddles to identify the final zone. Many readers had already reached the conclusion that such a technique must exist.
- The existence of a final, hidden riddle that completes the game. When a reader finds this riddle in the final zone, he or she will be able to utilise elements of the previous riddles to form and solve the last riddle. The decryption of the last riddle will lead to the cache that contains the owl.

In 1995, Valentin said that the book's readers have collectively got 95% of the solution, but as they are not sharing and communicating their solutions, they can't get the last 5%. He also said that when he was checking on the cache of the owl in August 1995, he found some earth overturned about 400 feet (120 m) from it, but that he was unable to tell if it was done by an animal, or by a treasure-seeker.

In 1996, Valentin said that the "remainders" are the key to the owl, and that they can be found in the decryption of some of the ten riddles that have wavelengths.

== Lawsuits ==
Hauser ("Max Valentin") died in 2009, leaving the secret to the puzzle inside a sealed envelope. The solutions were held by his lawyer until 2021, when Michel Becker gained hold of them.

In 2004, the original publisher of the book went bankrupt, and The Golden Owl statuette was seized as part of its liquidation. The creators recovered it in 2008.

In 2014, Michel Becker, the co-creator of the hunt, claimed sole ownership of the Golden Owl statuette, and intended to sell it. Two judicial decisions stopped this from taking place. The treasure-hunter association A2CO played an important role in the preservation of the prize, and the whole community raised petitions to support A2CO's lawyers.

== Legacy ==
The creators of Montecrypto: The Bitcoin Enigma, a treasure hunt game released on 20 February 2018 which offered a prize of 1 Bitcoin to the winning player, cited On the Trail of the Golden Owl.

== See also ==
- Masquerade, a 1979 book credited with popularizing the armchair treasure hunt genre
- The Secret (treasure hunt), a similar concept by publisher Byron Preiss begun in 1982 and still not completely solved
- Treasure: In Search of the Golden Horse, a 1984 multimedia treasure-hunting puzzle
