= Point Zero =

Point Zero may refer to:

- Point Zero (band), now known as War of Ages
- Point Zero (brand), a Canadian clothing company
- Point Zero Games, a publisher of the Army of Zero card game
- Asahi Point Zero, a non-alcoholic beer
- Kilometre zero, a road distance point

== See also ==
- Zero point (disambiguation)
