= The Bee on the Comb =

Book by Kit Williams

- Cover of untitled first edition
- Author: Kit Williams
- Illustrator: Kit Williams
- Language: English
- Genre: Puzzle book / Picture book
- Published: 1984
- Publisher: Jonathan Cape
- Publication place: United Kingdom
- Pages: 32

The Bee on the Comb is an armchair treasure hunt book, written and illustrated by Kit Williams and published in May 1984. It is a follow-up to Williams' previous treasure hunt book Masquerade, although not a direct sequel.

The book was initially published without a visible title, with the result that it is also known as "Untitled", and "the bee book" and other variations. Discovering the book's true title was the basis of a competition for readers.

== Plot ==
The book tells the story of a day in the life of a beekeeper named Ambrose, and how he and his bees are affected by personifications of the four seasons.

== Contest ==
The Bee on the Comb is an armchair treasure hunt, although participants did not have to physically find the treasure. Readers were challenged to discover the book's proper title, and to send that title to the author, expressed creatively but non-verbally. The prize – a golden 'queen bee' statuette and a unique titled copy of the book – would be awarded to the entrant whom Kit Williams judged to have expressed the title in the most interesting way.

The contest had a set duration of "a year and a day" from publication of the book, so came to an end on 25 May 1985. Kit Williams appeared on the BBC1 chat show Wogan to judge the finalists' entries and announce the winner. The winner was Steve Pearce of Leicester who submitted a small decorated cabinet that depicted the title when the handle was turned.
