= Edward K. Beale =

U.S. Coast Guard commander

Edward K. Beale is an author and retired United States Coast Guard Commander. He is a native of Tolland, Connecticut.

== Early life ==
Beale grew up in eastern and central Connecticut and attended Tolland High School. At Tolland he was Cross Country team co-captain, active in the instrumental music program, founder of several clubs, and a member of the National Honor Society. He represented Tolland as a delegate to Boy's State in 1987 and earned both the John Philip Sousa band award and the Daughters of the American Revolution "good citizen" scholarship. He was also active as a member of the U.S. national orienteering team and earned the rank of Eagle Scout.

== Military service ==
Edward Beale entered military service in 1988 as a cadet at the U.S. Coast Guard Academy. During his cadet years, Beale performed with numerous musical groups, including The Idlers, the Windjammers, Regimental Band, chapel choir and NiteCaps jazz band. He was the editor of the cadet magazine Howling Gale from 1990 to 1992, and received an award from the Bill Hewitt endowment for writing. Beale held lead roles in the annual cadet musicals Lil Abner, Once Upon A Mattress, and Guys and Dolls. Graduating in 1992 with a degree in Civil Engineering, Beale was assigned as a deck watch officer aboard USCGC Munro based from Alameda, California.

After earning wings through Navy Flight School in 1994, Beale was assigned to USCG Air Station Brooklyn, New York as an HH-65 helicopter pilot in 1996. During a subsequent aviation assignment at Atlantic City, New Jersey, Beale was the first on scene responding to the sunken vessel Beth Dee Bob. This case and three others like it within a 13-day period in 1999 brought about significant changes to commercial fishing vessel regulations and inspections, and became the subject of a book titled "The Sea's Bitter Harvest" by Douglas A. Campbell .

Beale was assigned to support Arctic and Antarctic research as a deployable pilot with USCG Polar Operations Division in 2000. The aviation detachment (AVDET) under his command assisted chief scientist Dr. Jackie Grebmeier and researchers from the University of Tennessee sailing with USCGC Healy in 2004 to further understand global climate change. He was then assigned as the Ship-Helicopter standardization training team in Mobile, Alabama. While based in Mobile he was among the first responders over the devastation created by Hurricane Katrina in 2005, and was the subject of several print and internet articles by author Lary Bloom. His exploits were also detailed in the 2009 book "The Test of our Times" by former director of Homeland Security, Tom Ridge.

After earning a Masters of Arts in Education (Educational Technology) from Embry-Riddle Aeronautical University and selected to Phi Kappa Phi in 2007, Beale was assigned to the USCG Leadership Development Center as the chief of training support. His duties included maintenance of two dozen curricula and instructional survey analysis for over 6000 annual students. He is a founding member of the Southeast Connecticut chapter of the American Society for Training & Development (ASTD). In 2012 Beale retired from military service at the rank of Commander.

== Personal life ==
Beale is active in researching and preserving USCG history and is a life member of both the USCG Aviation Association and the Foundation for Coast Guard History. He holds a technician class amateur radio license. He is also the USCG Idlers historian. In 2013 he circumnavigated the globe by ship with his late wife Michelle, a voyage which became the subject of a non-fiction book.

== Publications ==
Beale is co-author of the award-winning travelogue West By Sea: A Treasure Hunt that Spans the Globe. He has authored and co-authored several articles in the field of human performance, notably in the use of Importance-Performance analysis to enhance adult training and education curricula. James Madison University published an article co-authored by Beale about classroom redesign and technology integration at San Diego State University. His original commentary about collaborative construction and maintenance of military procedures was the catalyst for the USCG Marine Inspector Wiki . His poem "You Belong" was featured by the Worcester Poetry Society in 2024 as part of their Rain Poems collection. Beale released "Finished Things: Chasing the Other Side of Done" in 2025 with long-time collaborator William J. Parry.
