= Dugald Thompson =

Dugald Thompson could refer to:

- Dugald Thompson, the controversial winner of the Golden Hare and creator of Haresoft; see Hareraiser, a computer game
- Dugald Thomson (1849–1922), member of the Australian Parliament for North Sydney
