= Régis Hauser =

French author

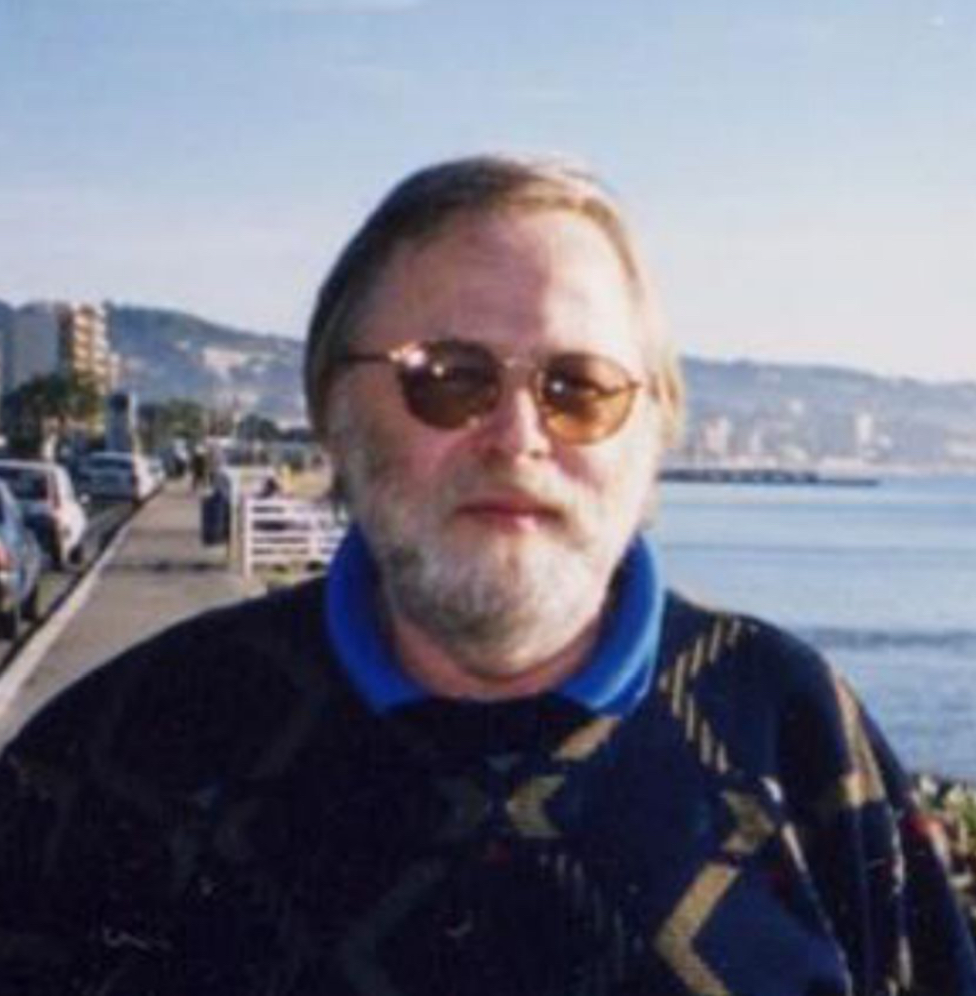

Paul Régis Hauser (27 February 1947 – 23 April 2009) was a French writer and puzzle designer, famous as the creator of numerous treasure hunts, including On the Trail of the Golden Owl, under the pseudonym Max Valentin.

== Life and career ==
Hauser was a native of Sarreguemines, Moselle. During childhood, Hauser and his brother Jean-Loup were members of a band, 'The Tigers'. They held concerts in France, Belgium, Germany and Luxembourg. Later, in the 1970s, Hauser became a rally driver. He also had a career as a marketing consultant and was a keen adopter of new technologies. This led into his work designing treasure hunts.

Hauser died in Metz during the night of 23 April 2009.

== Books ==
Hauser wrote books about his professional activities in communications, as well as about popular subjects, such as remarks on women, and funny or unusual graffiti.

- Design and write effective mailings, How to sell, by mail, number of products, ideas, services (Organisation, 1988)
- They are terrible (Hermé 1989)
- Effective direct marketing, Sales by persuasion (Organisation, 1991)
- The walls are laughing, Volume 1 (Manya, 1991)
- The walls are laughing, Volume 2 (Manya, 1992)
- The walls are laughing, Volume 3 (Manya, 1997)
- The walls are laughing, Complete Edition (Manya, 1997)
- The Treasure Hunter's Guide (Marabout, 1998), a collection of articles about historical treasures
- The trap of the botanist (Ramsay, 2003), a thriller

== Treasure hunts ==
From 1993 to 2001, Hauser created many treasure hunts, in print and online, often under the pseudonym "Max Valentin". All his treasure hunts were solved or halted by their producers/publishers during his lifetime, with the exception of On The Trail Of The Golden Owl.

- On The Trail Of The Golden Owl (1993) was Hauser's first treasure hunt. He started to think about it in the late 1970s, and launched it in May 1993. The statue was discovered on October 3, 2024, making it the second longest treasure hunt ever organized (after The Secret). The Chouette d'Or was the longest running treasure hunt with a single prize, while 3 of the Secret's 12 prizes have been found.
- Cryptique (1996), a series of online treasure hunts commissioned by Microsoft France, for the launch of MSN. Four were published in 1996; the last two in the series were canceled at the last moment.
- Book of Orval Treasury (1997).
- Treasure hunts for Paris-Match (Michel Lafon, 1997).
- Hunting allergens (1998), an internal non-public hunt for pharmaceutical company Schering-Plough.
- The Treasure of Malbrouck (1999), a hunt commissioned by the General Council of Moselle to celebrate the reconstruction and public opening of the Castle of Manderen (former Malbrouck Castle). At the request of the organizers, the riddles were themed around the castle, Malbrouck, and Moselle.
- Venice (2000) for Cryo Networks. Twelve treasure hunts were planned, intended to be released online one after another, as soon as the previous one was resolved. Only the first two were published, as Cryo Networks decided to close the game. The riddles of this hunt, although calibrated to last for two months each, were rather hard to solve.
- The Mystery of the Victoria (2000), commissioned by Junior Science & Vie magazine. The first fifteen young researchers who had given the correct answer to the riddles were invited, with their families, to the castle of Thury, where they were given the opportunity to compete to unearth a chest containing the treasure, hidden in the park.
- Treasure Hunt 2001 (2001), a large online treasure hunt conducted in eight languages. It was launched at 00:01 GMT on 1 January 2001. The developers spent lot of time on design, implementation, graphic development and the interface.
- Goal : Treasure (2003) for PlayJam, a TV show created by the Canal Satellite group.

Hauser was also the creator of the online "Game of the Cistes". Players hide treasures somewhere in France, and then create riddles that conceal the location. Other players online can try to find them.
