= Gold Rush (web series) =

Gold Rush is an American reality competition web series created by Mark Burnett, designed by AOL, developed by VPI.Net and hosted by Mark Steines, that was released on AOL in 2006. The format was of an internet scavenger hunt that is offering chances to win $US50,000, $100,000 and $1,000,000.

In a November 2006 interview, Burnett discussed creating a second round of Gold Rush, but it did not come to fruition.

== Overview ==
Gold Rush consisted of 13 rounds of gameplay. In order to qualify for a chance to win, participants had to correctly complete a series of tasks on AOL.com's Gold Rush hub in order to stockpile virtual gold bars. Many of these tasks consisted of pop culture trivia challenges and online games. Clues to help solve each of the challenges could be found in CBS Television programs and commercials, magazines, radio, song lyrics, and on AOL curated and created by the marketing team of VPI.

In each round, the first three players who completed the challenges and collected 12 virtual gold bars were taken to a location somewhere in the United States where they competed on-camera in head-to-head, reality-style competition (the "Gold Competition") for a chance to win $100,000 in gold. In the Finale Round of Gold Rush, the 12 previous $100,000 winners returned, joined by 6 new contestants, to vie for the $1 million grand prize.

Various companies signed on as partners of Gold Rush. Each company's brand was integrated into various parts of Gold Rush, including game clues and challenges throughout the game. Best Buy, Chevrolet, Coke Zero, T-Mobile, and WaMu (Washington Mutual) was a leading sponsor in the inaugural season under the direction of Brendan Foley, VP of Digital Marketing at WaMu. WaMu used the sponsorship to increase our brand presence nationwide as we embarked on branch expansion on a national footprint. “We had a 21 percent jump in new free checking accounts in the third quarter of 2006" mentioned Brendan Foley.
