= Alkemstone =

1981 video game

- Publisher: Level-10
- Platform: Apple II
- Release: 1981
- Genre: Puzzle

Alkemstone is a puzzle video game published by Level-10 (a division of Dakin 5) for the Apple II in 1981. It is a puzzle in a dungeon which the character explores to determine the location of the Alkemstone.

== Prize ==
The Alkemstone was hidden in the real world and the publisher offered a $5000 reward for the first person to decipher its location. It was likely inspired by the popularity of the Masquerade armchair treasure hunt published in 1979 and still unsolved at the time of Alkemstone's release.

The reward was increased to $7500 in 1982. The prize was never awarded and it is unknown if anyone solved the clues or recovered the Alkemstone from the location it was hidden.

== Gameplay ==
The dungeon size is 32 rooms wide x 16 rooms deep; however, some clues appear intermittently and therefore rooms must be carefully inspected over many visits.

== Reception ==
Forrest Johnson reviewed Alkemstone in The Space Gamer No. 48. Johnson commented that "Don't buy this one unless you seriously intend to win the five thou and have a high tolerance for boredom."
