= Triple-O =

Triple-O may refer to:

- 000 (emergency telephone number), the primary national emergency number in Australia
- Triple-O sauce, the signature sauce of Canadian restaurant White Spot
- Triple-O's restaurants, White Spot's fast-food brand

== See also ==
- OOO (disambiguation)
- Triple zero (disambiguation)
