= OOO =

OOO, Ooo, OoO or ooo may refer to:

== Arts and entertainment ==
- OnlyOneOf (OOO), a K-pop boy group under 8D Creative
- Kamen Rider OOO, a 2010–11 tokusatsu series
- Öoo, a 2025 video game by Nama Takahashi
- "Ooo", a song by !!! from the 2015 album As If
- "Ooo", a track from the 2015 Undertale Soundtrack album
- "O.O.O (Over&Over&Over)", theme of TV competition show Girls Planet 999
- Land of Ooo, the setting of animated series Adventure Time
- The Time Monster, a 1972 Doctor Who serial (production code OOO)

== Computing and networking ==
- .OOO, an Internet top-level domain
- OpenOffice.org (OOo), a discontinued office application suite
- Out-of-order execution (OoO), a paradigm in microprocessors

== Other uses ==
- OOO gauge, an old British model railway scale
- Object-oriented ontology, a metaphysical school of thought
- OOO, a business and finance abbreviation for out of office
- ООО, a type of private limited company in Russia
- O-O-O, the move notation for queenside castling in chess

== See also ==
- oOoOO, a musical project
- OO (disambiguation)
- Triple-O (disambiguation)
- Triple zero (disambiguation), including 000 and 0-0-0
- One on One (disambiguation)
- Out of Order (disambiguation)
- Alturas Municipal Airport, former FAA LID O00
- Order of operations, in evaluating mathematical expressions
- Three Rings Design, an online game developer
- Oath of Office, an oath people must take before partaking in the duties of office
