= Charitable activities related to the COVID-19 pandemic =

The COVID-19 pandemic has greatly impacted the international and domestic economies. Thus, many organizations, private individuals, religious institutions and governments have created different charitable drives, concerts and other events to lessen the economic impact felt.

== Business individuals ==
George Soros directed his Open Society Foundation to create a funding package of $130 million to support workers and their families in New York City, emergency relief to vulnerable workers across the world, and countering disinformation amongst other causes. Mark Zuckerberg and his wife Priscilla Chan, directed their foundation Chan Zuckerberg Initiative to donate $1 million in relief with a quarter of the amount to go to the Wilcox Medical Center, and the remainder going to helping the community on Kauai. Jeff Bezos donated $100 million to Feeding America non-profit to help Americans facing food insecurity during the pandemic.

Michael Kors gave $2 million to NYU Langone Health, New York Presbyterian Hospital, God's Love We Deliver non-profit and the CFDA/Vogue Fashion Fund for COVID-19 Relief. The Versace Family donated $500,000 to the San Raffaele Hospitals ICU and the Camera Nazionale Della Moda Italiana's relief fund. Jimmy Choo donated $500,000 to medical professionals via the National Health Service Relief Fund and the WHO Relief Fund.

The founder of Bass Pro Shops, Johnny Morris, donated one million ASTM Level 1 Procedure Face Masks throughout the United States. In a charitable action towards his workers the CEO of Delta Air Lines Ed Bastian announced that he would forgo his own salary for six months in an effort to protect the general workers.

== Celebrities ==
On April 18, 2020, celebrities such as Lady Gaga, Elton John, Stevie Wonder, and Andrea Bocelli came together to livestream a concert for the World Health Organization in support of the organizations general fund. While the event was broadcast, philanthropists and companies were encouraged to contribute to the fund, although some had already contributed about $150 million to it prior to the airing of the program. On World Health Day, Sean McLoughlin, an Irish YouTuber was the main organizer for the #HopeFromHome program that brought together entertainers, influencers, gamers and other creators from YouTube, Facebook, Twitter and TikTok. All participants fundraised for multiple organizations through Tiltify with a total of $1.7 million distributed evenly to United Way Worldwide, the United Nations Foundation for COVID-19 Solidarity Response Fund for the WHO, and Comic Relief US's Red Nose Day.

Other celebrities have created clothing lines based around the pandemic with the proceeds donated to the World Health Organizations Fund, such as Harry Styles T-shirt campaign and Ryan Reynolds and Blake Lively's T-shirt campaign. Misha Collins revamped his week long scavenger hunt; GISH, into a day long Play-At-Home hunt with the registration fee being used to provide meals for children who have lost food access due to the shutdowns.

NBA Charlotte Hornets player Bismarck Biyombo donated over $1 million worth of medical supplies to his home country of the Democratic Republic of Congo, and New Orleans Pelicans forward Zion Williamson announced via Instagram that he would help cover the salaries of all those who worked at the team stadium while the games were canceled.

== Companies ==
Starbucks committed $10 million to a newly created Starbucks Global Partner Emergency Relief Program to specifically work for their workers facing extreme hardships as a result of COVID-19 and allow them to have access to emergency support. Twitter CEO Jack Dorsey committed $1 billion worth of equity of his digital payment platform Square to his Start Small LLC to fund COVID-19 relief around the world. The Philadelphia Eagles matched a $1 million donation to COVID-19 relief efforts to the $1 million donation that the team's owner, Jeffrey Lurie did. TikTok pledged $375 million to multiple organizations to fight the pandemic, Facebook has pledged $220 million, and Google has pledged $800 million.

Other companies have created specific lines of products to sell during the pandemic with 100% of the sales being donated to a specific organization or charity to help offset the COVID-19 pandemic. PopSockets donated their proceeds from their limited run to Doctors Without Borders and Feeding America, a Houston-based jewelry brand Golden Thread donated the proceeds of their Community collection to Houston Food Bank, a partner of Feeding America. The Igloo Cooler Company announced that for a thirty-day period they would donate 100% of all profits from their Playmate coolers to the CDC Foundation Coronavirus Response Fund.

TikTok also added a "Donation Stickers" feature to the platform, allowing users to place stickers on the videos they create that link directly to in-app donation pages, with the goal of encouraging people to donate to charitable organizations during the pandemic.

In April 2020, the Astros Foundation partnered with Crane Worldwide, both owned by Jim Crane, to provide medical equipment to those in need. The Astros Foundation donated $400,000 to support hospitals in the Texas Medical Center while Crane Worldwide delivered approximately 10 million masks, hundreds of thousands of test swabs, 200,000 face shields, 30,000 goggles and 470 forehead thermometers to hospitals in Texas.

== Non-profits ==
Many food based non-profits created food distribution programs to help alleviate the strain on local food banks as unemployment rose due to the pandemic. Non-profits such as Feeding America, World Central Kitchen, and Half-Table Man Disaster Relief worked to either distribute food directly to individuals or to the food banks.

Other organizations such as the World Health Organization urged for donations that would go to the COVID-19 Solidarity Response Fund, a central fund to aid critical response efforts worldwide. The Actors Fund, an emergency fund for essential medication costs and basic living expenses live streamed The Phantom of the Opera at London's Royal Albert Hall starring Ramin Karimloo, Sierra Boggess, and Hadley Fraser, on YouTube to provide entertainment and raise funds.

In an effort to lessen the impact on the animals in their care, local animal shelters and rescue groups across the world have lessened services and pushed for animal adoption or fostering during the pandemic. Shelters used the lack of animals in their care due to community response, to help distribute pet food to those unable to purchase food for their pets either due to economic or health based concerns.

Some organizations remained partially open in an effort to help the families of essential employees or the homeless populations in the area. The YMCA in certain areas opened the bathroom and shower facilities during certain hours for the homeless populations, created activity packs for children based on school district lists, and child care for essential workers while asking for donations to offset the costs.

The Crypto community started a charity for relief efforts in India, raising almost $1B in funds, the majority from a charitable donation from Vitalik Buterin.
