= The Merlin Mystery =

1998 children's book by Jonathan Gunson

The Merlin Mystery is a 1998 puzzle/children's book, written by Jonathan Gunson and illustrated by Gunson and Marten Coombe. Published by Warner Books and certified by Mensa, it served as an armchair treasure hunt book, challenging its readers to solve the titular mystery by deciphering the pictures to learn how to cast a magic spell, the details of which were to be drawn and sent to an official address. None of the 30,000 entries received contained the correct solution, so the £75,000 prize was donated to the World Wildlife Fund.

== Plot ==
The book starts with an unnamed black cat investigating the run-down former living quarters of the wizard Merlin of Arthurian legend with the implied intent of trying to find something worth stealing. While there she meets a northern spotted owl who takes her through the house and explains Merlin's life, magical abilities, and what the book describes as 'The Pendragon Alchemy', a philosophy of life that says that giving nets greater rewards, both monetary and emotional, than taking. The book tells of Merlin protecting an unnamed princess from a cadre of evil sorcerers (and in the process creating a ring of stones in Avebury), and falling in love with Nimue, the Lady of the Lake, described as being a water sprite princess.

It is revealed that the black cat is Nimue and the owl is Merlin. The couple return to their natural forms and resume their love affair. Nimue steals Merlin's Wand in order to give it to the evil sorcerers to free them. Initially believing she could save the magical world with their help, is eventually deceived. When she realizes her mistake, she attempts to use the wand against the sorcerers. However, Merlin, misunderstanding her intentions, steps in and is struck by a bolt from the wand, imprisoning him magically. In his final act, Merlin transforms Nimue into the water of a nearby lake, close to the cave where he remains trapped. They are fated to be confined, yet in proximity, until 'the seeker' (the reader) solves 'the spell' (the puzzle's solution), thereby summoning the wand as the ultimate reward.

== Puzzle and solution ==
In keeping with earlier armchair treasure hunt books, such as Masquerade, the plot bears no relevance to the solution. The answer is instead found in the illustrations and in the squares that border every page. Every page is littered with symbols pointing to the solution including alchemical symbols, astrological signs and heraldic cadency symbols. The borders contain objects that make up the solution including Latin names for plants, chemical elements, and symbols indicating direction and movement. The book also includes images of a variety of landmarks, and of English culture such as Beefeaters, Town criers and Toby Jugs.

The solution to the puzzle is found in a list of 75 objects placed around the page borders. These objects are found by drawing 75 lines through the book "in 3 dimensions".

The lines all start at different border squares on each page of the book, indicated by silver Nimue symbols (the astrological symbol for Mercury) and witch hats. Gold and silver Merlin symbols then tell you to turn to a different page. On that second page, gold alchemy symbols tell you which direction to draw the line, crossing the page to a new border square. Gold and silver cadency symbols tell you to turn to yet another page of the book. On that third page, crescent moons tell you to move around the border to find the correct object. The 75 objects are ordered based on Roman numerals encoded into etched tiles on each page.

Correctly interpreting the list of objects tells you how to perform the spell. During a full moon, facing north, a pentagram made of five different pieces of wood is placed inside a salt circle. 12 runes are placed around the circle and a 13th rune is placed inside the north point of the pentagram. Silver and gold candles are lit and placed either side of the pentagram and a censer burning rosemary is placed in the centre. The method of casting the spell is to speak the names of the 13 runes, extinguish the candles, and then say "Peace".

== Soundtrack ==
A soundtrack CD was especially produced by British composer and producer Julia Taylor-Stanley, who composed, performed and produced all the titles, with vocals by Miriam Stockley, Shelagh and Sheryle Gwynfar, and Joss Ackland. It was published by EarthTone Records under the group name Alkaemy, and released on September 15, 1998. The CD was meant to be a companion to the worldwide release of the book.

== Prize ==
Along with a prize of either £75,000 or $125,000 (which were then equal under the exchange rate), the winner would have been awarded a thirty-six inch long wand, the head of which was made from ancient gold-threaded Brazilian crystal set into silver with a gilded staff representing a branch from the tree of life. The head of the wand also has a ring of alchemical symbols around it. Along with the wand, the winner would also have received:

- A bracelet containing twelve golden alchemical symbols
- A larger golden symbol, Sulphur Sublimate, attached to a shard of lapis lazuli
- A small vial of pure 24-carat gold pellets which the book claims comes from the River Nile
- Three charms chained together, of the Sun, the Moon, and Saturn, also representing three sorcerers from the story.
- A solid oak chest to contain all the prizes, possessing three locks and three different keys. The lid of the box bears the words "Merlinius Est Mihi Dominus"

== Reviews ==
- SF Site

== Select bibliography ==
- Jonathan Gunson & Marten Coombe, The Merlin Mystery, Warner Books, 1998 ( ISBN 0-446-52432-8 ) ( LC 98-84996 )
