= Out of Order =

Out of Order may refer to:

== Film ==
- Out of Order (1987 film), a British film
- Out of Order (1997 film), a Hungarian comedy film
- Out of Order (2024 film), a Chinese comedy film starring Ma Dong-seok
- Out of Order (2025 Philippine film), a Philippine legal thriller-drama film
- Out of Order (2025 American film), an American comedy film

== Television ==
- "Out of Order" (Curious George episode)
- Out of Order (miniseries), a 2003 miniseries starring Eric Stoltz and Felicity Huffman
- Illegal - Justice, Out of Order, an Indian web series

== Music ==
- Out of Order (Nuclear Assault album), 1991
- Out of Order (Rod Stewart album), 1988
  - Out of Order Tour

== Other ==
- Out of Order (novel), a 1936 novel by Phoebe Atwood Taylor
- Out of Order (play), a 1990 play by Ray Cooney
- Out of Order (video game), a 2003 adventure video game
- Out of Order (play), a 2026 play by Roger Steinmann
- Out of Order, a radio show formerly hosted by Jed the Fish
- Out of Order, a BBC radio quiz 1988–97, hosted by Patrick Hannan
- Out of Order, an outdoor installation by Scottish artist David Mach located in Kingston upon Thames, southwest London, England

Out of order or out-of-order may refer to:

- not in order (disambiguation), in various senses
- Out-of-order execution, a paradigm used in high-performance microprocessors
- contrary to rules of order
