= Hareraiser =

1984 video game

- Acorn Electron box art
- Publisher: Haresoft
- Platforms: Acorn Electron, Amstrad CPC, BBC Micro, Commodore 64, VIC-20, Dragon 32, MSX, Oric Atmos, ZX Spectrum
- Release: 1984
- Genre: Adventure
- Mode: Single-player

Hareraiser is a video game released in 1984 in the United Kingdom in two parts: Prelude and Finale. The game was published for Acorn Electron, Amstrad CPC, BBC Micro Model B, Commodore 64, VIC-20, Dragon 32, MSX, Oric Atmos, and ZX Spectrum at £8.95 for each part.

The solvers of Prelude would also then have to buy and solve Finale. They could then enter a competition to locate the prize, the bejewelled 18 carat "Golden Hare" pendant featured on the cover. The prize was worth £30,000 and would be awarded to the first winner of the game and found the hidden location (in the real world) first.

== Gameplay ==
=== Hareraiser: Prelude ===
In game shot with the hare (ZX Spectrum)

The game is a title screen with the game rules and a series of graphical screens showing grass, sky, and trees with text clues at the top and bottom of the screen. The hints in the first part of the game, "Prelude," are well-known proverbs and sayings. The only interaction is pressing the cursor keys to follow the hare, which moves across the screen and disappears to one side. "Rooms" are a non-Euclidean space - the user wanting to go back and pressing the appropriate key did not always return to the same place, sometimes ending up in a different "room."

=== Hareraiser: Finale ===
The game also presents a title screen with the rules of the game and a series of graphical screens, the action takes place in the evening (night). The hints at the top and bottom of the screen are specific search instructions, information that not all of the words in the hints are in order, and a numeric code common to all copies of the game.

== Background ==
The golden hare had previously been the prize for solving the book Masquerade, by the British artist Kit Williams. It had been buried at a secret location (Ampthill Park in Bedfordshire), the object of the game being to solve the clues in the book that would lead the successful treasure-hunter to this location and the golden prize. Several sources state, erroneously, that Hareraiser is based on Masquerade - in fact, the only thing apart from the prize that the two have in common is that both feature a hare.

Haresoft was founded by Dugald Thompson, the controversial winner of Masquerade, and his business partner John Guard.

== Release ==
Haresoft claimed the game was released in two parts "to make it fun and enable competitors of all ages to participate". Sinclair User magazine however suggested it was simply to make more money.

Haresoft stated that an additional clue had been revealed in Harrods by TV personality Anneka Rice. The nature of the clue remains unknown, as does whether or not Rice even revealed such a clue.

The game did not sell well and Haresoft went into liquidation. Hareraiser was never solved, and the hare was sold at a Sotheby's auction by the creditors in 1988. Although only given a guide price of £3,000–6,000, it did in fact exceed Haresoft's stated value, selling for £31,900. Although it was rumoured to have been sold again in the early 1990s, its whereabouts were unknown for over 20 years until July 2009 when an appeal was made on BBC Radio 4. The current owner's granddaughter got in touch and Kit Williams was reunited with the hare for a BBC TV documentary.

== Reception ==
The game was awarded 3/10 in Sinclair User with reviewer Richard Price struggling to find any reason to play the game except "the sincere need to get rich".

At the Norwich Gaming Festival in 2017, comedian and computer game historian Stuart Ashen described and showed the game play, and called it "quite possibly the worst video game ever," further revealing that the solution to the videogame's predecessor had been discovered via cheating. Ashen further stated that he believed the puzzle was intentionally designed to be unsolvable so that Haresoft would not lose the art piece (the golden hare).
