= Kirin Free =

Japanese non-alcoholic beer

- Type: Non-alcoholic beer
- Manufacturer: Kirin Brewery Company
- Distributor: Kirin Brewery Company
- Origin: Japan
- Introduced: April 8, 2009
- Alcohol by volume: 0.00%
- Colour: Pilsener colour
- Related products: Asahi Point Zero; Suntory Fine Zero; Sapporo Super Clear; Kirin Yasumu Hi no Alc. 0.00%
- Website: http://www.kirinholdings.co.jp/english/

Kirin Free is a non-alcoholic beer sold in Japan by Kirin Brewery Company.

== Ingredients ==
- Malt
- Dietary fiber
- High-fructose corn syrup
- Hops
- Acidity regulator
- Flavor
- Amino acid of condiment
- Vitamin C as an antioxidant
- Bittering agent

== Nutritional value per 100 g ==
Calories: 16 kcal
Protein: 0.1 - 0.3 g
Lipids: 0 g
Glucide (Carbohydrate): 3.3 g
Dietary fiber: 1.2 g
Sodium: 0 - 10 mg
