= Money Hunt: The Mystery of the Missing Link =

Money Hunt: The Mystery of the Missing Link was a 1984 contest video directed by David Hemmings and written by Gregory Ross. The video was a contest containing the clues necessary to solve a puzzle. The first person to solve the contest by calling a toll-free telephone number by the deadline would receive USD 100,000.

The video was hosted by John Hillerman, who narrated a short opening segment directly to the viewer explaining the contest rules and providing a few cursory hints. The remainder of the video was a half-hour narrative, in the form of a farcical film noir detective story. The detective, "Cash Hunt" (played by John Ashton) attempted to solve the same puzzle as the viewer. The solution consisted of a city and state within the United States, a safe deposit box, and a telephone number (the toll-free number necessary to phone in the solution).

== See also ==
- Treasure: In Search of the Golden Horse
