= Zero point =

Zero point may refer to:

- The hypocenter of a nuclear explosion
- Origin (mathematics), a fixed point of reference for a coordinate system
- Zero Point (film), an Estonian film
- Zero point (photometry), a calibration mechanism for magnitude in astronomy
- Zero Point (South Georgia), a point in Possession Bay, South Georgia
- Zero Point Interchange, a cloverleaf interchange in Islamabad, Pakistan, at the intersection of Islamabad Highway, Kashmir Highway and Khayaban-e-Suharwardy
- Zero Point railway station, a railway station on the Pakistan–India border
- Lingdian (band) (零点乐队), sometimes translated in English as Zero Point, a Chinese band
- "Zero Point", a song by Tori Amos, released on A Piano: The Collection
- "The Zero Point", a 2018 song by Au5
- Zero Point, Dhaka, a public square in Bangladesh

== See also ==
- Zero-point energy, the minimum energy a quantum mechanical system may have
- Zero-point field, a synonym for the vacuum state in quantum field theory
- Hofstadter zero-point, a special point associated with every plane triangle
- Point of origin (disambiguation)
- Triple zero (disambiguation)
- Point Zero (disambiguation)
