= Masquerade (book) =

British pictorial treasure hunt storybook

- Front cover of first edition
- Author: Kit Williams
- Illustrator: Kit Williams
- Language: English
- Genre: Armchair treasure hunt
- Published: 20 September 1979
- Publisher: Jonathan Cape
- Publication place: United Kingdom
- Pages: 32
- ISBN: 978-0-22401-617-9
- Followed by: Masquerade: The Complete Book with the Answer Explained

Masquerade is a picture book, written and illustrated by the English artist Kit Williams, and published in the UK in September 1979 by Jonathan Cape. The book was a treasure hunt containing clues to the location of a hare made of gold and precious stones, fabricated and buried somewhere in Great Britain by Williams. The publishers anticipated a print run of 60,000 copies for the UK market, but the book became an unexpected international success. It eventually sold over a million copies worldwide, attracting treasure hunters from all over the world to come to Britain and search for the hare, and turned the previously little-known Williams into a celebrity.

In February 1982, Williams received a sketch of the location which he considered to be the correct answer, and Ken Thomas was declared the winner of the treasure hunt. However, the fact that Thomas had located the treasure without being able to solve the puzzle and his insistence on complete anonymity aroused suspicion. Two other people had solved the puzzle correctly, but had sent their answer to Williams too late.

In December 1988, a newspaper investigation discovered Thomas's true identity and revealed that he had obtained knowledge of the hare's location through his links to Williams' former girlfriend. In the same month, the hare was sold at auction to an anonymous overseas buyer. Its whereabouts remained a mystery for over twenty years until a BBC documentary in 2009 prompted the owner's family to identify themselves and briefly loan it back to the UK for a private exhibition of Williams' work, and again in 2012 for a longer period as part of a museum exhibition, the first time the hare had been put on public display. The hare was sold again at auction in November 2025. Masquerade is now recognised as the inspiration for a genre of books known today as armchair treasure hunts.

== Background ==
Kit Williams is a self-taught artist who had started painting in the late 1960s after serving in the Royal Navy. After seeing one of his works in a gallery in Liverpool, he was taken on by Lionel Levy and Eric Lister, owners of the Portal Gallery in London, which specialises in work by self-taught artists. Tom Maschler, then chairman of the publishing company Jonathan Cape, was a frequent visitor to the gallery, and saw one of Williams' exhibitions there. Fascinated by Williams' style, he asked the gallery if they could arrange a meeting with Williams, and in 1976 Lister and Maschler drove to Williams' home in rural Gloucestershire. Maschler asked Williams if he would be interested in creating a children's book, but to his disappointment Williams told him that he had no interest in doing so, as it would mean painting the same characters throughout the book, which he would find boring. As Maschler left at the end of the meeting, he said to Williams, "It's a pity about the book. You could have produced a book like no other. A book that would have caught the imagination of the world."

Williams was intrigued by Maschler's comment, and started to think about the type of book he could produce. He later told The New York Times, "I thought, 'How can I make people look at the paintings, look and look again?' And then I thought, 'If there is something actually hidden in them, it gives people an excuse to slip into them.'" Having then decided that the book would be some form of treasure hunt, he then resolved that the prize would be "something romantic, a modern-day Holy Grail":

Absolute purity was essential. I felt I was doing something for my own childhood, when the prizes on the backs of cereal packets turned out to be illusions. This had to be real gold and real gems, a jewel I conceived and made myself, and actually buried in the ground.

Masquerade features fifteen detailed paintings illustrating the story of a hare named Jack Hare, who seeks to carry a treasure from the Moon (depicted as a woman) to her love object, the Sun (a man). On reaching the Sun, Jack finds that he has lost the treasure, and the reader is left to discover its location.

With the idea for the puzzle book and its story in place, Williams called Maschler to tell him about his idea. Maschler invited him to the offices of Jonathan Cape in London, where Williams explained that he would need £3000 to buy the gold needed to create the treasure. Maschler agreed and drew up a contract.

Considering ideas for how to encode the solution to the puzzle within his book, Williams discounted crosswords and anagrams as too easy to solve. His solution was inspired by a mechanical model he had made, which he described as an "orrery". It consisted of a circular painting mounted on a spindle so that it could rotate, and around the edge of the painting was a border with letters that spelled out the phrase "dance three rings the songthrush sings add one a day to ensnare the hare". With everything now in place, Williams spent the following three years working on the paintings for the book, and wrote the story for Masquerade in a few weeks. As a tribute to Levy, Lister and Maschler, the names of all three men appear within the book's paintings. By 1979, he had finished the paintings and called Maschler again to tell him that everything was ready, delivering the individually wrapped paintings to Jonathan Cape's offices in London.

== Manufacture and burial of the hare ==
In his workshop in Gloucestershire, Williams used the 18-carat gold and precious stones that he had bought to craft a hare in the form of a large filigree pendant on a segmented chain. In order to work with such a large quantity of gold, Williams had to obtain a licence from the Bank of England. He described the creation of the hare in his introduction to the paperback version of Masquerade:

From one piece of gold I cut the outline of the hare, five and a half inches from nose to tail, then sawed out and drilled the filigree work within the body. The other piece of gold was enough to make the hare's legs, ears and tail, which I riveted to the body. Everything else – the bells and their tongues, the chains, the tiny animals – had to be made by melting down the remaining scraps of gold, beating them into coin shapes, then cutting them out. The stones I chose were a ruby for the hare's eye, turquoise in the flowers on the body and a large moonstone for the back of the moon. The faces of the sun and moon are made of faience, a substance the ancient Egyptians used a lot. I had to experiment for ages because the facial expressions changed so much as the faience cooled and hardened.

In 1980, The Sunday Times described the hare as containing seven ounces of gold, five turquoises, two citrines, and one ruby. Once the hare was finished, it was placed inside a ceramic, hare-shaped casket, also created by Williams in his workshop, which was then filled with wax and sealed. This was both to protect the prize from the soil and from damage from objects used by searchers to carry out their digging, and to foil attempts to locate the treasure with a metal detector. The casket was inscribed with the legend "I am the keeper of the jewel of Masquerade, which lies waiting safe inside me for you or eternity".

Maschler realised that the burial of the hare would require a witness who was widely recognised as credible and trustworthy, in order to prevent accusations that Williams had not really buried it. His choice was the historian and writer Bamber Gascoigne, who was also well known to the general public as host of the long-running television quiz programme University Challenge. In addition, Gascoigne was already acquainted with the jewel and the forthcoming book – the photograph of the hare used on the book's back cover had been taken by his artist wife Christina at the Gascoignes' house in Richmond in London. During the night of 7–8 August 1979, Williams and Gascoigne drove to the chosen location in Williams' van, where Williams dug a hole at the burial spot to a depth of about 14 inches ("from the tip of my hand to my elbow"), and replaced the turf on top of it. The night was chosen specifically as the burial had to be carried out on a clear night under the light of the full moon, and without using torches to avoid attracting attention.

== Publication and search ==
The book was promoted in the Sunday newspaper The Observer four days before its publication, and the day before its publication it was the subject of a feature on BBC1's early evening current affairs programme Nationwide. The television documentary showed film of Williams fabricating the hare in his workshop and placing it inside its ceramic casket, along with footage of Williams driving off in his van in the dark and then supposedly returning after burying the jewel, announcing to the camera, "Now the hare's been buried... it's up to you to find it".

Williams announced publicly that his forthcoming book contained all the clues necessary to decode the treasure's precise location in Britain to "within a few inches". At the time, the only additional clue he provided was that the hare was buried on public property that could be easily accessed. To ensure that readers from outside the UK had an equal chance of winning, Williams also announced that he would confirm the first precisely correct answer sent to him by post.

The book went on sale on Thursday 20 September 1979. Jonathan Cape had printed an initial run of 60,000 copies, believing it would be a sufficient quantity to last until Christmas. However, to their surprise the book was an immediate runaway success – the initial run sold out in just three days, and Jonathan Cape had to print two more runs of 50,000 each within days.

Masquerade was published in France and in Germany in September 1980, followed by publication in the US on 3 October 1980 and then in Japan, where the book was called 仮面舞踏会 (Kamenbutoukai, meaning "masquerade ball" or "masked ball"). By the end of December 1980, Masquerade had sold more than 400,000 copies – 350,000 in the UK, Australia and South Africa combined, 30,000 in West Germany, 20,000 in Japan, and 10,000 in each of France, the Netherlands, Italy, and the USA. By October 1981, it had sold 400,000 copies in the UK and 360,000 copies in the US and had been translated into 11 languages. In the same month, Laker Airways began offering 10-day charter flights from the USA to the UK for Americans eager to search for the treasure. Masquerade eventually sold more than a million copies. A modified version of the book also appeared in Italian, with a treasure buried in Italy. It was reinvented and translated by Joan Arnold and Lilli Denon with the name Il tesoro di Masquerade, published by Emme Edizioni.

Searchers often dug up public and private property acting on hunches. A hill in England named Haresfield Beacon was a popular site for searchers, due to its name and its proximity to Williams' home. The hill was the property of the National Trust, and Williams paid £50 for the cost of a sign notifying searchers that the hare was not hidden on the premises. Real-life locations reproduced in the paintings were searched by treasure hunters, including Sudbury Hall in Derbyshire and the town of Tewkesbury in Gloucestershire. In an interview in December 1980, Williams clarified that the hare was not buried on private property, and its location was not marked by any physical object.

Williams was receiving 100 letters per week at his cottage in Gloucestershire, and he had to open and check every one to check if any of them contained the correct answer. Gascoigne, having been asked by Williams to witness the burial of the hare and to document the contest from beginning to end, did so in his book Quest for the Golden Hare. Gascoigne summarised his experiences thus:

Tens of thousands of letters from Masqueraders have convinced me that the human mind has an equal capacity for pattern-matching and self-deception. While some addicts were busy cooking the riddle, others were more single-mindedly continuing their own pursuit of the hare quite regardless of the news that it had been found. Their own theories had come to seem so convincing that no exterior evidence could refute them. These most determined of Masqueraders may grudgingly have accepted that a hare of some sort was dug up at Ampthill, but they believed there would be another hare, or a better solution, awaiting them at their favourite spot. Kit would expect them to continue undismayed by the much publicised diversion at Ampthill and would be looking forward to the day when he would greet them as the real discoverers of the real puzzle of Masquerade. Optimistic expeditions were still setting out, with shovels and maps, throughout the summer of 1982.

== Additional clue in The Sunday Times ==
On 21 December 1980, an additional clue was published in The Sunday Times. The clue was a drawing by Williams, comprising a self portrait surrounded by fourteen animals – the first letter of each of the five animals above Williams and of the nine animals below him spelled out MERRY CHRISTMAS. Williams told The Sunday Times that of the two clues in the picture, one was a red herring and the other was not. In the drawing, Williams' right hand held a fish labelled "Å6000" – 6000 angstroms is the wavelength of red light, and therefore this was literally the "red herring". In his left hand he held a piece of paper with six lines of seemingly random symbols. To solve this clue, the newspaper page needed to be folded in half to match up the bottom three lines with the top three lines, which created complete letters and words, and then a light shone through the paper to read a message written in mirror writing. The message read "2 DO MY WORK I A.ED [appointed] IV MEN FROM XX THE TALLEST AND THE FATTEST AND THE RIGHTEOUS FOLLOW THE SINISTER".

== Solution ==
"Isaac Newton" painting. Newton's eyes and middle fingers, and those of the mouse in his sleeve, point to the letters of the word "H-O-U-R". Newton's rings and puppets also give the sequence for digits and animals throughout the book.

The answer to the puzzle is hidden in the fifteen painted illustrations in the book, and the words in the border surrounding each painting. It was also hinted at in the riddle on the book's title page, with its references to "eyes" and "pointing": "To solve the hidden riddle, you must use your eyes/And find the hare in every picture that may point you to the prize".

The "four men from twenty" (written in Roman numerals) from The Sunday Times clue referred to four fingers and toes out of a total of twenty digits, "the tallest and the fattest" related to using the longest and biggest digits, and "the righteous follow the sinister" meant that the right (righteous) side came after the left (sinister) side. In each painting, a line must be drawn from each person or animal's eye through the longest digit on the corresponding hand, foot, paw or fin, and continued out until it reached or "pointed" to a letter in the border. Using the clue of "the righteous follow the sinister", this was done first for the left eye through longest digit on the left hand or front paw, then from the left eye through the longest digit on the left foot/rear paw/fin, then from the right eye through the longest digit on the right hand or front paw, and finally from the right eye through the longest digit on the right foot/rear paw/fin. This is only done for eyes and digits that are both visible in the painting – if the eye is visible but the corresponding digit is not, or vice versa, this part of the sequence is skipped. The sequence is carried out first for any men or boys visible in the painting, then women and girls, and then each animal in turn, in the order shown by the animals hanging on the back wall in the twelfth painting, known as the "Isaac Newton" painting.

Following this method reveals fifteen words or short phrases from each painting, which together form a nineteen-word message:

CATHERINES
LONG FINGER
OVER
SHADOWS
EARTH
BURIED
YELLOW
AMULET
MIDDAY
POINTS
THE
HOUR
IN
LIGHT OF EQUINOX
LOOK YOU

The acrostic of these words and phrases reads CLOSE BY AMPTHILL. Properly interpreted, the message tells the reader that the treasure is buried near the cross erected as a monument to Catherine of Aragon in Ampthill Park, at the precise spot touched by the tip of the monument's shadow at midday on the day of either the vernal or autumnal equinox.

Many additional hints and "confirmers" are scattered throughout the book – for example, in the second painting depicting the Sun and the Moon dancing around the Earth, the hands of the two figures are clasped together, pointing at the approximate date of the March equinox, and the last painting displays a magic square written in sand on the beach, whose numbers match the number of letters in each of the fifteen paintings that make up the nineteen-word message above.

Williams stated that he had wanted "an exact spot on grass, like a cross on a pirate's map", and that he had chosen midday because it was the time when the shadow was at its shortest and most distinct, making it easier to locate the burial spot more precisely. He gave his reasons for his choice of location for the hare's burial in the introduction to the paperback version of Masquerade, published in 1982 shortly after the hare had been discovered:

It would have to be marked by something already there – a monument, for example. I was fascinated by astronomy and I worked out a way to use a monument like the upright pointer on a sundial. The treasure would be buried where the end of the shadow was on a certain day: I liked the idea of the equinox because it gives you two days each year, spring and autumn, when the shadow is exactly the same length. I remembered visiting a place called Ampthill Park when I lived near Bedford, where there's a cross about 18 feet high commemorating the first of Henry VIII's six wives, Catherine of Aragon.

To mark the exact spot required for the burial, Williams had visited the park on the day of the equinox while he was still working on the paintings for the book, bringing a magnet with him:

Spot on midday, I saw where the tip of the shadow was, and I put my penknife in the ground. And then I wiggled it about a bit and put my thumb in the ground, and made a hole, into which I put the magnet, but with its north end facing south and its south end facing north. And then I just covered over the hole, and left.

When Williams and Gascoigne arrived at Ampthill Park at night in August 1979 to bury the jewel and the casket, Williams was therefore able to relocate the burial place by placing a magnetic compass on the ground to find the magnet he had buried previously.

== Discovery of the hare ==
Two physics teachers from Lancashire, former research physicists at the University of Sheffield, Mike Barker and John Rousseau, had interpreted The Sunday Times clue and discovered how to solve the puzzle and find the nineteen-word message. However, the friends believed that to claim the prize they would have to dig and physically find the hare. On 4 January 1982, Barker and his family were returning by car from a skiing holiday in Europe, and he decided to make a diversion to Ampthill Park. Exploring the area around the cross and adjusting for the difference between magnetic north and true north, he was able to calculate a rough location of where the tip of the shadow would fall on the equinox, but decided to go home and make an inclinometer in order to make a more precise calculation. Barker returned with the inclinometer on 18 February, marked the position, and then returned at night the same day to dig the area, but he found nothing. Barker and Rousseau decided to wait until 21 March, the date of the equinox, to resume their search.

The following day, 19 February 1982, Kit Williams received a letter in the mail which included a crude sketch of Ampthill Park and the cross, which he recognised as the first correct solution mailed to him. Williams immediately phoned the sender, Ken Thomas, to tell Thomas that he had won and to congratulate him, but to his surprise Thomas seemed indifferent, telling Williams he was suffering from a heavy cold. As the conversation progressed, Williams realised that Thompson had not solved the puzzle in the intended manner, but appeared at the time to have blundered into a lucky guess. Having been told by Williams that the location was correct, he returned to Ampthill Park the next day, 20 February, and was surprised to find evidence of previous digging. Thomas returned to dig at the spot over the following three nights, but was still unable to locate the casket. Finally he returned on Wednesday 24 February, dressed as a workman, erected an official-looking barrier around the location, and started digging during daylight. Thomas found the casket during the afternoon, in the earth that had already been dug up – it is not clear whether it was he or Barker who had previously unearthed it during their night digs and missed it.

Having called Williams to tell him that he had finally located the hare and would like Williams to be present at the official unveiling, Thomas suddenly disappeared for a week and could not be contacted. When he finally resurfaced, he postponed the meeting several times, and finally agreed to a date of Friday 12 March, but would only agree to one newspaper interview, with The Sunday Times, and one television interview, to be shown on the BBC's Omnibus programme. By now, Williams and Maschler were starting to become suspicious of Thomas's behaviour: he had said that Ken Thomas was a pseudonym, he would only appear disguised and shielding his face, and for the Omnibus interview he appeared behind frosted glass and with his voice disguised. Thomas said that "it's been an anti-climax since I found it": the narrator of the Omnibus feature, Bernard Clark, described Thomas as "an enormously complicated man". Thomas told the programme that at first he thought the burial site was at Kimbolton Castle, which had been home to Catherine of Aragon, but then switched to Ampthill Park after discovering that Williams had lived nearby. Both Maschler and Gascoigne noted that Thomas had not solved the main riddle: Thomas's story was that he had been walking his dog in the park when the dog urinated on the cross, and going up to the monument afterwards and reading the inscription to Catherine of Aragon led him to deduce that this was the burial location.

The news of the hare's discovery was announced on the BBC's evening news programme on Sunday 14 March, and Omnibus was broadcast later the same evening. Barker saw the news item and called Rousseau to tell him the hare had been found. The following day, Barker wrote to Williams with the solution, but when his sister found Williams' address a few days later, Barker then immediately sent a telegram to Williams with just the words CLOSE BY AMPTHILL. When Williams received it, he realised that Barker and Rousseau had correctly solved the riddle, which was confirmed when Barker's letter with the full solution eventually arrived. However, Thomas had already been announced as the winner, and although Williams was sympathetic to the teachers, he could not do anything about it.

== Revelation of the deception ==
In June 1984, Home Computing Weekly announced that a new software company called Haresoft had obtained the jewel and was offering it or the cash equivalent of £30,000 as a prize for a new treasure hunt contest in the form of a computer game, Hareraiser. However, when the game was released it was widely criticised in the UK's computer games magazines and sold poorly. Nobody ever solved Hareraiser's puzzle, and as the gameplay consisted of nothing more than limited graphics and a few lines of seemingly meaningless text, it has been described as a "rip-off". Haresoft went into liquidation, and as the hare was the company's only valuable asset, it was announced that it would be sold in December 1988 at Sotheby's auction house in London, on behalf of the administrators, Peat Marwick.

The announcement of the sale caught the eye of Frank Branston, the founder and editor of Bedfordshire on Sunday, the local newspaper in the Ampthill area. In the early 1980s he had been approached by John Guard, one of his sales representatives for the newspaper, who had told Branston that he knew that the hare was buried in Ampthill Park. When Branston asked Guard how he knew this, Guard told him that his current partner, Veronica "Ronnie" Roberts, (Note: Roberts was incorrectly named "Veronica Robertson" in the Bedfordshire on Sunday articles; this error was reproduced in The Sunday Times article on 11 December 1988.) had been a former girlfriend of Kit Williams while the book was being created and she had told Guard that she knew where the jewel was buried. Roberts had lived with Williams for 10 months during the preparation for Masquerade and had enough clues to be able to narrow down the hare's location to either Ampthill Park or Cornwall. She had also been the model for the "Polly Pocket" lady in one of the book's paintings. However, in subsequent conversations Guard would always tell Branston that he had not yet located the treasure. Guard had asked Branston where he could get hold of a powerful metal detector, and Branston suggested roping off the area and posing as a workman – exactly as Ken Thomas later did when he finally found the hare. When Branston saw pictures and television footage of Ken Thomas recovering the hare, he recognised that the man was not Guard in disguise, but subsequent investigations failed to provide any further details and Branston did not pursue the story further at that time.

In November 1988, with the news of the hare's forthcoming sale, Branston reopened his enquiries and discovered that the director of the liquidated Haresoft company was a man named Dugald Thompson, a local design engineer. Further investigation of Thompson's other former businesses revealed that Thompson and Guard had once been co-directors of another failed company called Clayprint. Branston and one of his reporters set out on 3 November to interview Guard and Thompson separately. Thompson was uncooperative, saying that Guard had not been involved in the search, and that the only information that he had received from Roberts was where Williams had lived. Roberts confirmed that she had met Thompson a couple of times, and Thompson had asked her where Williams had lived in Bedfordshire and Gloucestershire. Guard did not directly admit his part in the deception, but told Branston that he did know Thompson, and that his link to Williams was "tenuous".

Branston also spoke to Eric Compton, a local man that Guard had approached to help with the search because he had a metal detector. Compton told Branston that he and Guard had dug at the burial site between five and seven times, with Roberts accompanying them on the first dig. Compton also stated that Guard had offered him £1,000 to handle the publicity if they found the hare. On their last visit to the site, they had visited on the date of the equinox and Guard had pushed a stone into the ground to mark the spot, but when they returned a couple of nights later they still found nothing – by now Compton was fed up and refused to participate any further. A few months later, Guard visited Compton's house and told Compton that the hare had been found, and accused Compton of having it.

Branston published his findings in Bedfordshire on Sunday over two weeks, on 6 November and 13 November 1988, revealing that Dugald Thompson was Ken Thomas. A month later on 11 December, the story received nationwide coverage when The Sunday Times published the details of Branston's investigation. The Sunday Times said that Guard had been asking Roberts for details about the hare since the beginning of their relationship, and that Roberts had agreed to tell him what she knew, on condition that any profits would be donated to animal rights causes, although she did not know its exact location. Guard and two assistants were said to have started searching for it using metal detectors. Guard denied knowing Thompson at first, but after being shown the company documents, he stated that he had never searched for the hare, although he admitted telling Thompson about Ampthill. Roberts told the paper that she had been "shocked" when Guard told her that Ken Thomas was really Thompson, and had written to Williams to apologise. On learning of the deception, Williams was quoted by the newspaper as saying, "This tarnishes Masquerade and I'm shocked by what has emerged. I feel a deep sense of responsibility to all those many people who were genuinely looking for it. Although I didn't know it, it was a skeleton in my cupboard and I'm relieved it has come out." The newspaper stated that Thompson had used the hare as security in order to found the Haresoft software company. Branston had also spoken to Mike Barker and John Rousseau the previous month to tell them about the deception – Barker expressed his relief at finding out the truth.

The hare's auction took place at Sotheby's on 5 December 1988. Williams attended the auction, with the hope of buying back the hare, but was forced to drop out when the bidding reached £6,000. He had previously told Bedfordshire on Sunday that he would donate the hare to a museum if he won. The hare was eventually sold for £31,900 to an anonymous overseas buyer, and for more than twenty years its whereabouts remained unknown.

== Reappearance of the hare ==
On 14 July 2009, BBC Radio 4 broadcast The Grand Masquerade, a half-hour documentary to mark Masquerade's 30th anniversary. Presented by John O'Farrell, it told the story of the creation and solution of the puzzle, and the subsequent scandal involving the discovery of Thompson's deception. The programme included interviews with several of the original searchers, including Barker and Rousseau, and what was claimed to be Williams' first interview on the subject for over 20 years. During the programme Barker appealed to the unknown owner to release the hare so that it could be displayed to the public at an exhibition. In an interview published three days later in The Independent, Williams stated that he did not know where the hare was, believing that it was somewhere outside the UK and that "it has gone for ever".

However, after the documentary had been broadcast, the BBC was contacted by the granddaughter of its then current owner, an anonymous woman "based in the Far East". She told the BBC that it was locked away and only taken out once a year at Christmas. The owners arranged for the hare to be briefly returned to the UK to be included in a one-day exhibition of Williams' work at the Portal Gallery on 19 August 2009, and then displayed the following day at BFI Southbank, where BBC Four were hosting a launch party for their own television documentary of Williams to mark the book's anniversary, titled The Man Behind the Masquerade. The documentary's television crew filmed Williams as he was reunited with the hare in a hotel before the exhibition, where he examined it and confirmed it to be his own work. The programme also filmed the invitation-only exhibition at the Portal Gallery, and the unveiling of the hare to the unsuspecting guests. Among them was John Rousseau, who expressed his satisfaction at finally seeing the hare in person.

In the 2009 documentaries, Williams spoke for the first time about how he thought Roberts had discovered the hare's location and passed the information on to Guard and Thompson. On the day that he had buried the magnet, he had gone to Ampthill Park with Roberts for a picnic near the cross. Although he had not mentioned anything about the magnet and his plan to Roberts, he surmised that she must have guessed something from his behaviour. In 1982, shortly after the hare's discovery, Roberts had confirmed this theory, saying that Williams had visited her in Ampthill, telling her that he was there "on business", but that she realised afterwards that the real purpose of his visit was to check the shadow on the day of the equinox.

Roberts could not be located for her input into the 2009 documentaries; Guard was no longer alive, and Thompson refused to take part. His only interview at the time was with his local BBC radio station, in which he claimed that he had found the jewel by himself unaided, and that his disguise as Ken Thomas had been the idea of the book's publishers Jonathan Cape. Thompson also stated that the accepted version of the discovery was not correct, but that he could not reveal his version of events "for legal reasons".

After the exhibition at the Portal Gallery, the hare was returned to its owner in the Far East. However, it returned to the UK for a longer period of time in 2012, when it was put on display at the Victoria and Albert Museum in London, as part of its retrospective exhibition "British Design 1948–2012: Innovation in the Modern Age", from 28 March to 12 August 2012. This marked the first time the hare had ever been put on display to the general public. It was also displayed in the Sydney Opera House in 2015.

In November 2025, the hare was sold by Sotheby's in an online auction, which ended on 28 November 2025. The guide price was £15,000–£20,000, but strong interest resulted in a final price of £82,550. The buyer was said to be a private collector in the UK.

== Legacy ==
Masquerade became the forerunner of an entire genre of cryptic puzzles known as armchair treasure hunts. It spawned a succession of books and games from other publishers seeking to emulate its success, including The Piper of Dreams (Hodder & Stoughton, 1982), The Secret (Bantam Books, 1982), The Golden Key (William Maclellan, 1982), Treasure: In Search of the Golden Horse (Intravision, 1984), The Key to the Kingdom (Pavilion Books, 1992), The Merlin Mystery (Warner Books, 1998) and the French On the Trail of the Golden Owl (Manya, 1993), which was solved in October 2024.

Similar hunts have continued being published in various formats. Alkemstone (Level-10, 1981), a computer game developed during the height of the Masquerade hype, is still unsolved. Pimania (Automata UK, 1982) was solved in 1985, with the winners correctly deducing that the competition's £6,000 golden sundial would be located at Litlington White Horse in East Sussex, England. Many later hunts make use of technologies that were unavailable when Masquerade was published, such as the web-based homage Menagerie, the CD-ROM based Treasure Quest, and Text4Treasure, which uses SMS messaging. Others, such as Army of Zero and West by Sea: A Treasure Hunt That Spans the Globe (Expeditionaire, 2016) follow Masquerade's use of physical media for the main puzzles, but provide additional clues online.

Masquerade is one of the subjects presented in Brian Moriarty's 2002 presentation "The Secret of Psalm 46" with regards to game design, Easter eggs, and conspiracy theory.

Williams created one further treasure hunt book, The Bee on the Comb (1984), but in a television documentary the following year, he stated, "I'm not going to do any more puzzle books, I've had enough of all that."

== Select bibliography ==
- Kit Williams, Masquerade, London: Jonathan Cape, 1979 (ISBN 0-8052-3747-X)
- Kit Williams, Masquerade: The Complete Book with the Answer Explained , London: Jonathan Cape, 1982 [paperback] (ISBN 0-89480-369-7)
- Bamber Gascoigne, Quest for the Golden Hare, London: Jonathan Cape, 1983 (ISBN 0-224-02116-8)
