= USCGC Munro =

USCGC Munro has been the name of more than one United States Coast Guard ship, and may refer to:

- USCGC Douglas Munro (WHEC-724), commissioned in 1971 and decommissioned in 2021
- USCGC Munro (WMSL-755), launched in 2015
