= Triple zero =

Triple zero, Zero Zero Zero, 0-0-0 or variants may refer to:

- 000 (emergency telephone number), the Australian emergency telephone number
- ZeroZeroZero, an Italian crime drama TV series
  - ZeroZeroZero (book), a 2013 book by Roberto Saviano that is the basis for the TV series
  - ZeroZeroZero (album), a 2020 soundtrack of the TV series by Mogwai
- Star Wars Republic Commando: Triple Zero, a 2006 novel in the Star Wars Republic Commando series
- 000, the size of several small screw drives
- 0-0-0, a droid in Star Wars
- 0-0-0 or O-O-O, queen's side castling in chess notation
- Zero Zero Zero, an album by singer Sam Phillips
- "Triple Zero", a 1997 song by AFI from Shut Your Mouth and Open Your Eyes

== See also ==
- Origin (mathematics), (0,0,0) in three dimensions in Cartesian coordinates
- Coruscant, fictional planet in the Star Wars universe, coordinates 0,0,0
- MissingNo., a glitch Pokémon with the Pokédex index number 000
- OOO (disambiguation) (triple letter "O")
- Zero point (disambiguation)
- Point of origin (disambiguation)
- Black (0, 0, 0) in RGB color model
- Zero matrix
