= Internet scavenger hunt =

An Internet scavenger hunt or CyberHunt is an educational lesson which introduces the Internet to students. It is often used as tool for teaching students how to search the Internet and how to use the resources and information available on the Internet. It is an online activity in the form of a scavenger hunt that focuses on gathering information from web sites to answer questions or to support a concept on a particular theme or content area. The intent is to hunt for facts or information to add details for the answer to the question. The questions themselves may vary from the simple fact or statement to the more complex, depending upon the age and skill level of the student. By completing CyberHunts, students learn how to navigate a web site, scan a page for detailed information, and then apply the facts or ideas to the question. A CyberHunt is an excellent way to teach beginning internet researching skills.

An Internet scavenger hunt is a fact-finding exercise where students answer a list of questions or solve problems as they practice information seeking skills. A hunt can serve as a powerful tool to introduce the study of a new subject or to supplement the exploration of various sides of an issue.

Although hunts frequently move from web site to web site, some direct a student's exploration of a single, content rich site. The single site strategy is employed to introduce users to the elements of a highly sophisticated site like the Library of Congress site, the government site Congress.gov or the Smithsonian site. This permits the teacher to highlight the key areas of a web site.

== History ==
The first Internet Scavenger Hunt was developed in 1992 by Rick Gates. He was a professor at the University of California at the time. He created the hunt to encourage adults to explore the resources on the Internet. Gates distributed the questions to various Usenet newsgroups, LISTSERV discussion lists, and Gopher and FTP sites. He offered a prize for successful completion. As time went by he developed themed and then highly challenging hunts like researching a single email address.

== Levels of sophistication ==
Beginner hunts are highly directive, taking the user via a link to the specific web page. A moderately challenging activity takes the user to a web site that has the answer to a posed question and requires them to choose an appropriate link, use the site map, or site search engine to locate facts that support their answer. The most sophisticated activity may post several open ended questions that require the student to make many choices including search tool and method, web sites and finally the correct supporting information.

Hunts offer several advantages to using the Internet with younger web users. Since the developer chooses the web pages and links directly to them, this minimizes the risk of students being exposed to inappropriate material. With the student's web interaction highly scripted, misdirection by ads or video can be controlled.

Instructors can target the rigor of the activity to challenge students by varying the level of abstraction of questions as defined by Taxonomy of Educational Objectives. Relevance of instructional material may be addressed by using Internet based news resources to infuse current events into the lesson.

A well-developed scavenger hunt that is based on a novel enriches literature studies. It harnesses online resources to extend exploration of the setting and the plot. Highlighting historical references and lending insight through author study are also possible.

Having students create an Internet fact hunt about a subject is one method for developing higher order thinking skills while reflecting knowledge and developing technology skills.

== Benefits ==
The use of online resources for instruction and research takes advantage of widely available access to the hunt and the site(s) to which it is linked. This diminishes the need for extensive investments in print resources that quickly become outdated or irrelevant. A single book can be used by only one student at a time. A single web page can be accessed by millions. Typos and misinformation in print materials are there until the next printing. Typos or erroneous information on web pages are easily remedied in a matter of minutes.

Many educational hunts are posted on the Internet permitting users worldwide to use the activity. Hunts can also be crafted in some word processing software and run from the individual computer desktop. Some developers are providing hunt activities in pdf (portable document format). This provides for a more consistent product appearance when printed. Links embedded in pdf documents are active on computers that have access to the net.

Hunts are different from a webquest since the emphasis is on facts and finding information while webquest is inquiry-oriented activity that demands that students go beyond fact-finding.

== Examples ==
There are thousands of hunts on the web that are content focused and grade level specific. When creating the CyberHunt, the teacher selects web sites that support their specific curriculum focus. The instructor has control over which sites have the best information to answer the questions. The students use only those sites in the activity. The intent is to focus on the material and not have students spend time using search engines or directories to accumulate numerous websites that must then be accessed, assessed and evaluated. Instead, students use their time to navigate to teacher-selected sites for the information. The CyberHunt lesson is streamlined to a simple fact-finding activity. For this reason, the typical activity takes one or more class periods to finish.

There are no firm CyberHunt rules about the number of sites, the type of questions, or the amount of activity time to be allotted. CyberHunts have been created in all shapes and forms and for all grade levels. They cover most subjects and have no set time limit. The teacher has control over the sites, the type of questions, and the final product.
