= Treasure: In Search of the Golden Horse =

Laserdisc cover for Treasure

Treasure: In Search of the Golden Horse is a treasure hunting puzzle published in 1984 by the Intravision production company. It was conceived as a story-based contest by filmmaker Sheldon Renan similar in concept to that of Kit Williams' book Masquerade. The puzzle was presented in two formats, one in an elaborate book illustrated by Jean-Francois Podevin and published by Warner Books, and the other a direct-to-video motion picture filmed by Renan and starring Doryan Dean with Elisha Cook, Jr. in a supporting role. Voice-over narration was provided by actor Richard Lynch with music by composer Jesse Frederick. The film was first aired on cable television and subsequently sold on VHS, Betamax, Capacitance Electronic Disc, and Laserdisc formats by Vestron Video.

Designed and promoted as a contest, the puzzle asked treasure seekers to solve the rebus contained within the story to find the location of a one kilogram gold horse statuette buried on public land somewhere within the continental United States. The puzzle itself was designed by Paul Hoffman under the pseudonym "Dr. Crypton". The first person to solve the puzzle and dig up the horse before the May 26, 1989 deadline would keep the horse and an additional US$500,000 locked in a safe deposit box to be opened by a key hidden within the statuette. The solution was designed to be obtainable by either reading the book or watching the video, as all puzzle formats were considered exclusive of each other, albeit sharing certain similarities. The rules of the contest were overseen by the independent advertising agency, D.L. Blair.

== The film ==
The film was set in 1984 and was centered around a girl who's trying to find her horse, and also includes clues that you need to find a hidden golden horse statuette somewhere in the US.

== Solutions ==
Although the promoters of the contest claimed the rebus was solvable within the allotted time frame, this did not prove to be the case. The deadline passed without solution, and the prize was later donated to the Big Brothers Big Sisters of America charity. Even though the puzzle deadline had passed, neither Paul Hoffman nor the promoters of the contest publicized the solution, and many enthusiasts continued their attempts at solving it. Seven months later, Nick Boone and Anthony Castaneda, having arrived at what is now called the "Captain Nemo" solution to the book, travelled to Tennessee Pass in Colorado and dug up a vial on National Forest Service land near the 10th Mountain Division (United States) military memorial.

== See also ==
- The Clock Without a Face
- Money Hunt: The Mystery of the Missing Link
- On the Trail of the Golden Owl
- Paul Hoffman (science writer)
- Fenn treasure, found 2020
