= Asahi Point Zero =

Non-alcoholic beer

- Type: Non-alcoholic beer
- Manufacturer: Asahi Breweries
- Distributor: Asahi Breweries, Ltd.
- Country of origin: Japan
- Introduced: September 1, 2009
- Alcohol by volume: 0.00%
- Colour: Pilsener colour
- Related products: Kirin Free; Suntory Fine Zero; Sapporo Super Clear; Kirin Yasumu Hi no Alc. 0.00%
- Website: http://www.asahibeer.co.jp/english/

Nutritional value per 100 g
- Energy: 92 kJ (22 kcal)
- Carbohydrates: 5.4 g
- Dietary fiber: 0.0–0.1 g
- Fat: 0 g
- Protein: 0 g
Vitamins and minerals
- Other constituents: Quantity
- Purine base: 2.2 mg
- Sodium: 0–8 mg

Asahi Point Zero (アサヒポイントゼロ) is a non-alcoholic (0.00% ABV) beer sold in Japan by Asahi Breweries.

== Ingredients ==
- Starch
- Malt
- Glucose-fructose syrup (High-fructose corn syrup)
- Humulus lupulus
- Flavor
- Acidity regulator
- Amino acid (Glycine)
