= GISHWHES =

International media scavenger hunt

The Greatest International Scavenger Hunt the World Has Ever Seen
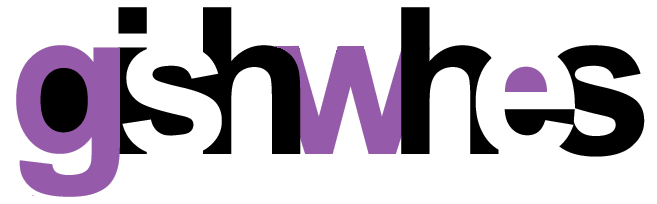
- The GISHWHES logo as of 2013
- Genre: Scavenger hunt
- Frequency: Annually
- Location: Worldwide
- Inaugurated: 2011
- Founder: Misha Collins
- Most recent: July 30 - August 6, 2022
- Next event: None (event permanently cancelled)
- Participants: 55,000 (2016)
- Website: gish.com

The Greatest International Scavenger Hunt the World Has Ever Seen (GISHWHES, pronounced gish-wes) (shortened to just "GISH") was an annual week-long competitive media scavenger hunt originally held each October or November, but more recently each August. Teams of five to 15 (previously nine to 15 before 2022) competitors earned points for submitting photos and videos of themselves completing prompts from a list they received at the beginning of the week. Actor Misha Collins officially founded GISHWHES in 2011 after a publicity stunt to help the television series Supernatural (in which Collins appeared) win a People's Choice Award. The competition held a world record for being the largest media scavenger hunt ever to take place, and several additional world records. The hunt also raised funds in support of several charities each year, and was affiliated with the Random Acts 501c3.

== History ==
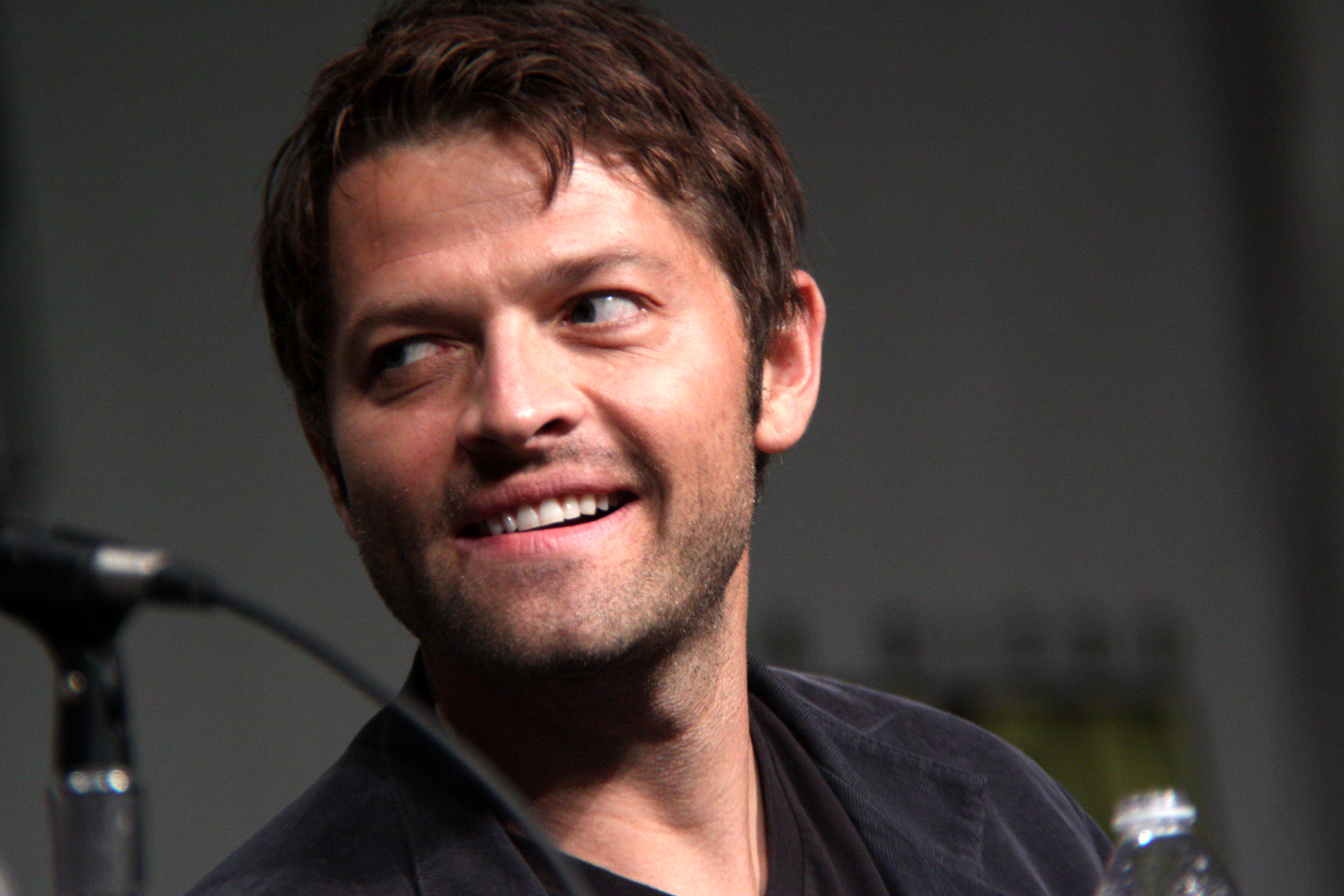
Collins in 2012

Actor Misha Collins, known for playing the angel Castiel on the American television series Supernatural, is the founder of GISHWHES. The competition began informally in 2010 when Holly Ollis, a publicist for Warner Bros., asked Collins to engage his audience to help Supernatural move from second place to first in the People's Choice Awards voting. Collins posted a message on Twitter, declaring that if the show won, Ollis had promised him a rhinoceros which he would share with everyone who helped by voting for the show. When Supernatural won the competition, Collins, partially inspired by his time at the University of Chicago as an undergraduate during which he participated in the school's annual scavenger hunt, asked his followers to send him self-addressed stamped envelopes into which he put scavenger hunt prompts written on the backs of jigsaw puzzle pieces from a puzzle depicting a rhino. Soon, participants began to respond to Collins's "absurd" requests. One successful prompt, for example, challenged fans to photograph a group of firemen wearing nothing but kale.

Collins enjoyed this exercise so much that he decided to create an official scavenger hunt in 2011. He established the event's website and gave it its name, the Greatest International Scavenger Hunt the World Has Ever Seen, calling its acronym, GISHWHES, "the ugliest acronym the world has ever seen". According to Collins, the primary reason for developing the competition was that he "loved the idea of thousands of people from all over the world connecting to create incredible things". He hoped to use GISHWHES to encourage participants "to do good in the world". The inaugural event, categorized by Guinness World Records as a "media scavenger hunt", broke the record for the largest scavenger hunt of its kind. In 2012, it broke its own record with 14,580 participants, representing 69 different countries. The contest broke two additional world records in 2013: the longest safety pin chain, measuring 1,901.8 metres (6,239.5 ft), and the largest online photo album of hugs, totaling 108,121 images.

On November 19, 2022, Misha Collins announced that he was officially putting GISH events on hold for the time being, saying he needed to focus his energy elsewhere.

== Contest ==
Yearly GISHWHES participation
Year	Dates of competition	Participants
2011	November 19–26	>6,000
2012	October 30 – November 4	14,580
2013	August 11–18	—
2014	August 2–9	~14,000
2015	August 1–8	—
2016	July 30 – August 6	55,000
2017	August 5–12	-
2018	July 28 - August 4	-
2019	July 27 - August 3	
2020	April 25 - April 26	
2021	May 22	
2022	July 30 – August 6	

On the first day of the week-long competition, a list is posted on the GISHWHES website with over 150 different tasks for competitors to complete during the hunt, which Collins and his friends, including co-coordinator Jean Louis Alexander, have devised prior to the beginning of the competition. Teams then submit photos or videos of themselves completing the prompts at the contest's website, receiving points for each item completed. While literal interpretations of prompts are preferred, judges will sometimes award points for especially creative responses. Prizes for the team with the most points at the end of GISHWHES have included a trip to Scotland for a slumber party with Collins and a trip to Vancouver for a "Viking surprise".

Teams consist of 15 members who may come from different countries. Individuals may prearrange teams or sign up individually, in which case they are randomly grouped into appropriately sized teams. As of the 2019 contest, signup costs ran US$25 per person with part of the participation fees going towards Random Acts, a non-profit run by Collins that aims to encourage random acts of kindness.

In 2018 the competition was rebranded under the name Greatest International Scavenger Hunt (GISH), and added a free app that can be downloaded to have information in a simpler and direct fashion, and to directly chat with others on their team or close to their location.

In April 2020 Misha Collins announced GISH would be launching their first ever 24 hour mini hunt, beginning April 25. Money raised from this hunt provided meals for children impacted by Covid-related school closures. This was also the first GISH hunt that Misha Collins has personally participated in, along with his wife Vikki and children West and Maison. Another 24 hour mini hunt was scheduled for May 30.

=== Challenges ===
GISHWHES challenges vary widely in focus and sometimes attract media attention. The Los Angeles-focused OC Weekly reported on a local ice cream shop's response to a GISHWHES team that asked them to create a custom ice cream flavor for the 2013 challenge "Get your team's new ice cream flavor on sale in an ice cream parlor". Another challenge involved participants using and spreading the word abnosome, Collins's portmanteau of abnormal and awesome. During the 2013 hunt, competitors were asked to dress up as the DC Comics character Flash and have their pictures taken next to a functioning particle accelerator. As a result, the Thomas Jefferson National Accelerator Facility and Fermilab received numerous emails from GISHWHES participants and set up special tours for the visitors. Dean Golembeski reported in Symmetry, the official magazine of Fermilab and the SLAC National Accelerator Laboratory, that the visits were welcomed and seen as an opportunity to educate a wider audience on the goals of and research done at national laboratories.

Most GISHWHES challenges were completed successfully by at least one team, according to Collins. During the 2012 contest, for example, only one item saw no successes: coating a commercial blimp with fall leaves. Collins speculated it failed because of physical limitations. A 2013 challenge noted by Écrans, a French website run by Libération, challenged competitors to convince astronauts on the International Space Station to take a photo holding a sign with their team's name. Efforts by participants were headed off by NASA, which posted that the astronauts were unable to participate on its official Twitter account.

==== Gallery ====
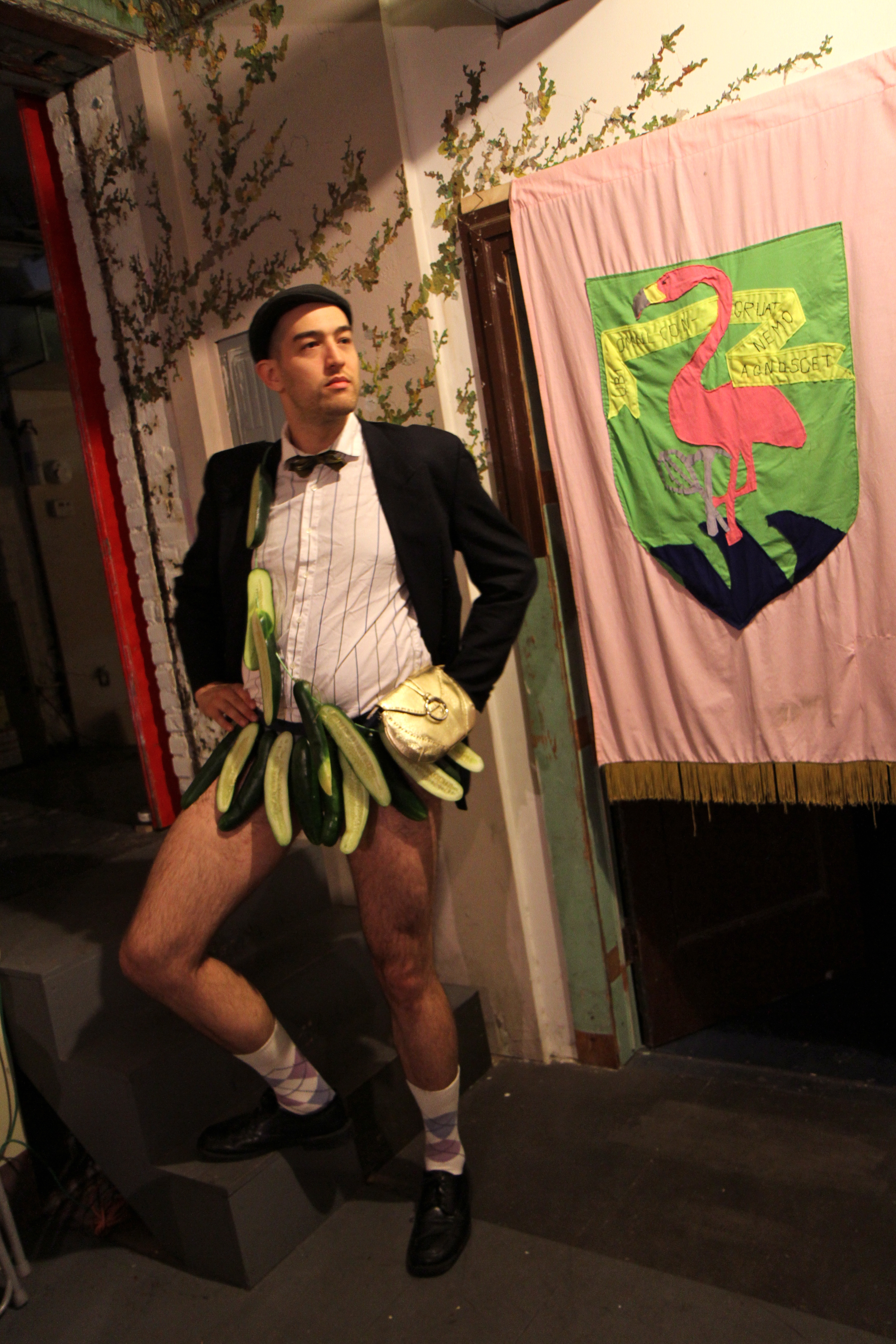
2012, No. 95: "Kilt made entirely of sliced cucumbers. Must be worn by a man."

2012, No. 117: "Play 'Duck Duck Goose' with real ducks and geese."

2012, No. 124: "Shoot an erotically charged scene. [...] The film must involve a pizza man and the actors can ONLY talk about grammar and fonts. Please use at least three of the following terms, 'kerning,' 'serif,' 'gerund,' 'participle,' and 'imperfective.'"

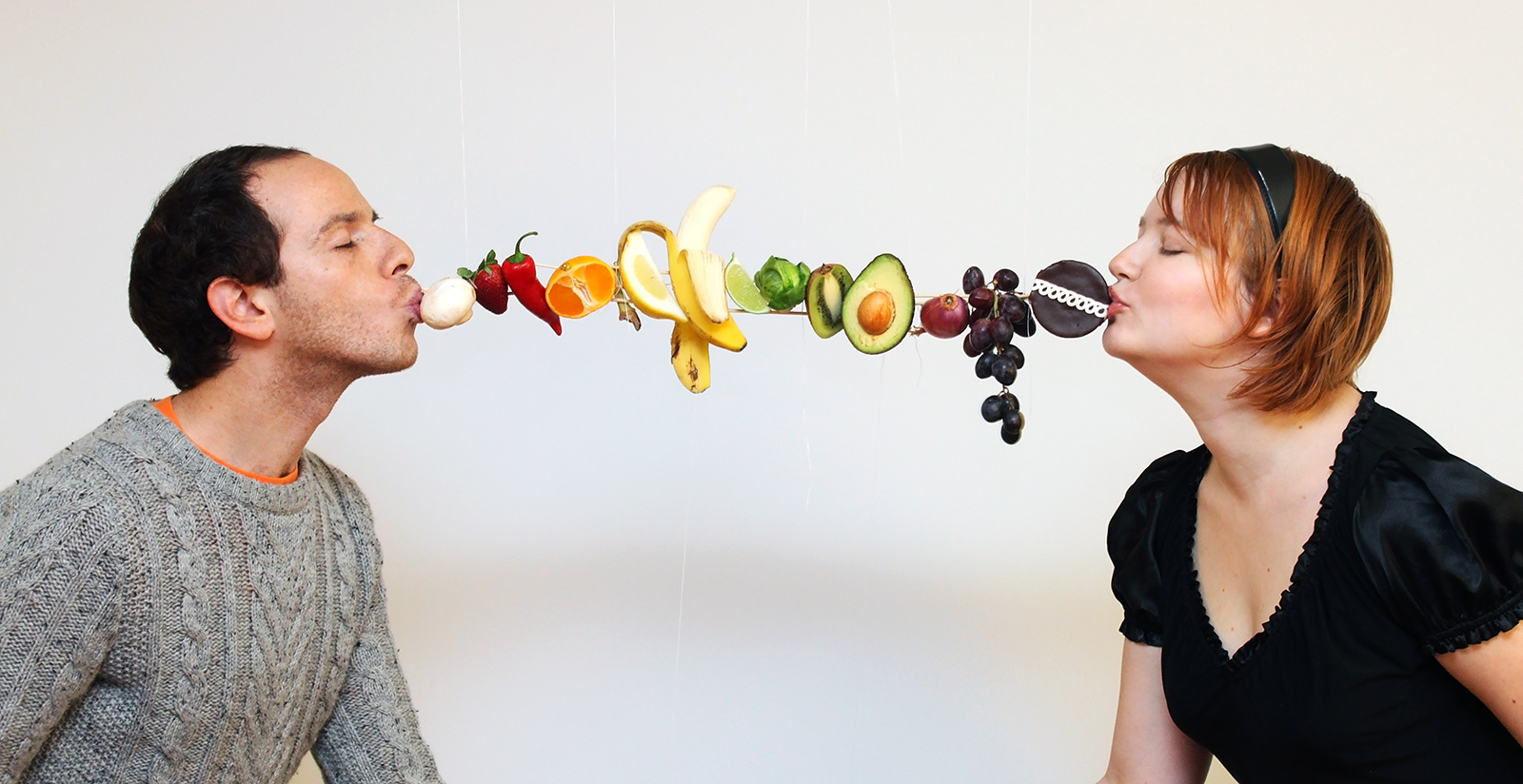
2012, No. 148: "A picture of you and a loved one kissing. Here's the catch though - you must have at least 11 food items between your lips and the lips of your loved one."

2013, No. 25: "Do a stealth act of kindness for someone in public or at work like leaving a flower on their windshield, or a 'kindness note' at their desk, etc. Film them discovering it."

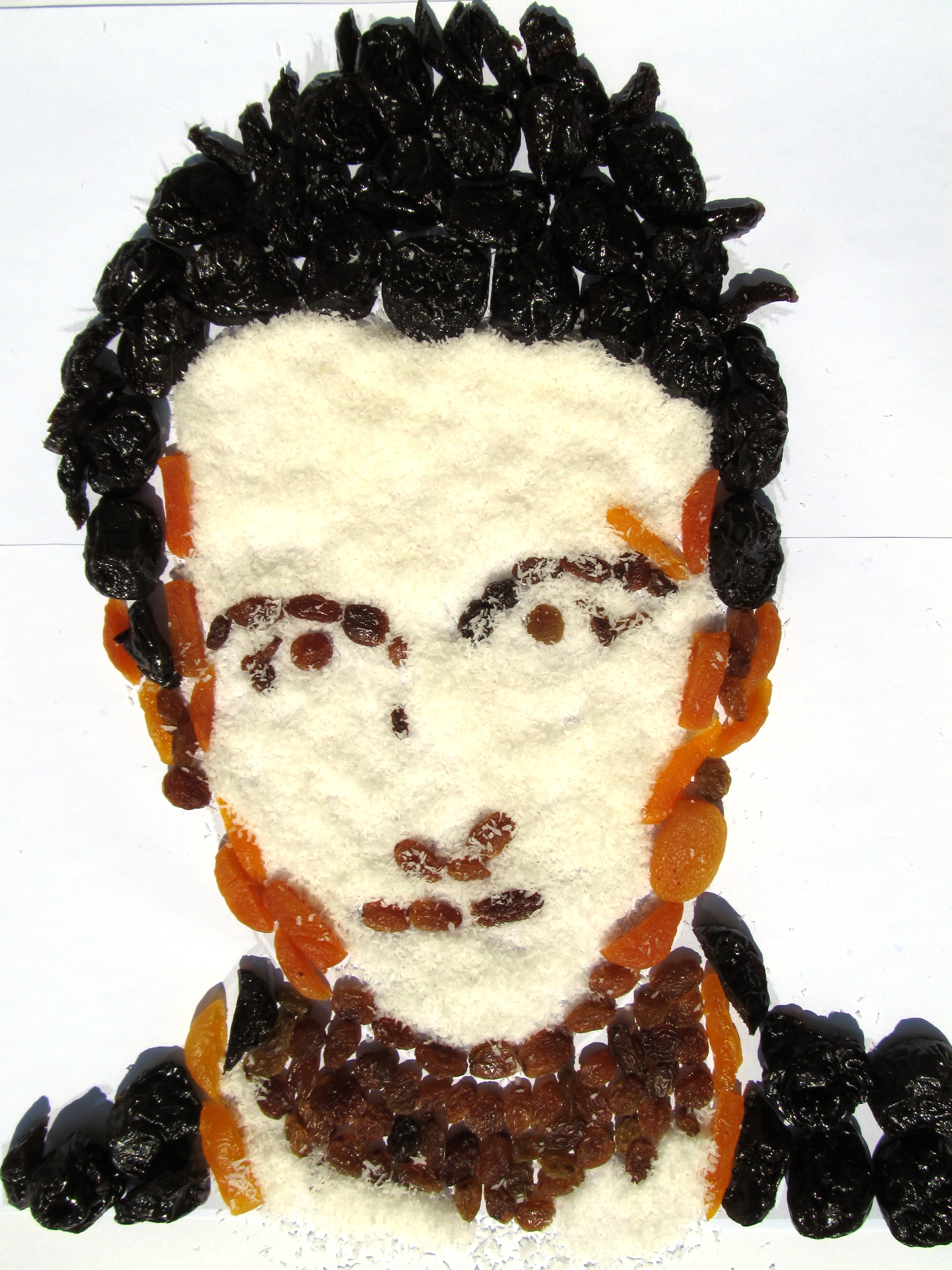
2013, No. 114: "Let's see a portrait of Chris Hardwick from the Nerdist.com made from dried fruit."

== Reception ==
Aspects of the contests have been well received by some media outlets. A writer for Nerdist.com called it an "avalanche of awesomeness" and compared the hunt's acronym to "an apocryphal Gwar album or a lesser deity in H.P. Lovecraft's consonant-laden pantheon". Reviewing the experience of participating in GISHWHES, a writer for Detroit's WKBD-TV described the contest as "a lot of fun" and recommended that others participate in the future. Shanghai Daily deemed several of GISHWHES's challenges "outrageous" and "visually stunning". Laura Prudom of The Huffington Post commended Collins's "herculean" efforts in organizing the event.

Not all reception has been positive. Emily VanDerWerff wrote for Vox that, "Quite a few of the items basically invite participants to pester—or even harass—the famous and semi-famous on Twitter, Tumblr, and Facebook." A 2014 challenge asked hunters to convince published science fiction authors to write a 140-character story for them and some, such as John Scalzi and Lauren DeStefano, complained that the task encouraged participants to harass them on social networks.

In an article analyzing Collins's relationship with his fanbase, Middlebury College Assistant Professor Louisa Ellen Stein argued that GISHWHES was a "co-authored transmedia experience" that "play[ed] with [the] power, erotics, and emotional excess present in Collins' fandom." Citing participants' independent efforts to coordinate teams using a variety of online platforms, Stein suggested that "GISHWHES may lack the overt language of industrial reconfiguration found in the Divine Kickstarter Project [a webseries that Collins engaged his fans to help fund]. But through its satire and dadaist play, it more fully models the potential for a congregation of authors, both official and unofficial, to direct fannish and creative investment into digital participation." Stein further argued that "decentralized projects like Gishwhes, with creators who fully immerse themselves in the surrounding digital cultures, show us the potential for future transmedia creative authorship in millennial culture."

== World records ==
GISHWHES has broken several Guinness World Records.

- Largest Photo Scavenger Hunt (2011)
- Largest Media Scavenger Hunt (2012) - 14,580 participants
- Most Pledges for a Campaign/to Complete a Random Act of Kindness (2012) - 93,376 pledges
- Largest Online Photo Album of Hugs (2013) - 108,121 hugs
- Largest Chain of Safety Pins (2013) - 3,583 feet (1,092 meters) long
- Largest Gathering of People Dressed as French Maids (2014) - 695 participants
- Most People in a Decorated Hat Competition (2014)
- Longest Human Chain to Pass Through a Hula Hoop (2014) - 572 participants
- Most Painted Rocks In One Place at One Time (2021) - 21,790 rocks
