= Army of Zero =

Puzzle and two-player card game

- Designers: Point Zero Games
- Publishers: Point Zero Games
- Players: 2
- Setup time: 1–5 minutes
- Playing time: 10-15 minutes
- Chance: Medium
- Age range: 7+

Army of Zero is a puzzle and two-player card game, published by Point Zero Games. Army of Zero is both a card game and an armchair treasure hunt, similar in concept to Masquerade and The Key To The Kingdom. A cash prize was on offer to the person who could provide the best solution to the puzzle. Army of Zero was launched at Toy Fair 2009, held at ExCeL London in January 2009.

The game includes two six-sided dice and a deck of ninety-nine cards. The cards are made up of eighty-four character cards, eight attack/defend cards, six cards defining the rules and one card which acts as an entry form into the puzzle competition.

== Card game ==
The cards can be used to play a two-player game. Each player receives ten character cards, dealt at random. In each round, both players put forward one of their characters, and these two characters battle each other. In each round of combat, each player can choose to attack or defend, but no character can attack for more than two rounds in a row. Players can gain an advantage by successfully predicting whether their opponent will attack or defend.

The outcome of each round is determined by the rolling of six-sided dice and adding the appropriate character statistics. Each character card has four statistics: speed, combat, weapon and armour. Each of these is an integer number, and each can range between -2 and +2.

The statistics used to resolve combat depend on whether each player chose to attack or defend. When a character is defeated, he or she is out of the game. When all ten of a player's characters are defeated, the other player is the winner.

== Characters and puzzle ==
Army of Zero has eighty-four character cards, depicting a series of odd fantasy characters. Each character is depicted as belonging to a particular "clan", each clan being named after an animal. The character designs are representative of the clans, so for example, the members of the Bat clan are all vampiric in appearance. Each character also has a name and a rank, or title. Each character's name is unique, but there are only five ranks; "Thegn", "Guardian", "Commander", "General" and "Lord".

The design of the eighty-four character cards includes a series of interconnected puzzles. The objective is to work out what the objective of the puzzle is, to solve it, and to submit the answer to Point Zero Games. A prize of £1,000 was on offer to the person providing the best solution by the closing date of April 30, 2010.

The puzzle was solved by Tim Pickup. The objective was to discover the identity of an implied missing character, General Voleda of the Crocodile Clan. Solving the puzzle required all eighty-four character cards, and part of the solution was related to arranging the cards in a particular configuration.
