= Out of Order (video game) =

2003 video game

- Developer(s): Tim Furnish
- Publisher(s): Hungry Software
- Platform(s): Microsoft Windows, macOS, Linux
- Release: NA: 2003
- Genre(s): 2D adventure

Out of Order is a freeware 2D point and click adventure video game by British indie developer Tim Furnish for Windows, macOS, and Linux featuring a comedic science fiction-adventure narrative.

== Story ==
The game's protagonist is Hurford Schlitzting, who is woken in the night by a thunderstorm. Hurford discovers that he, along with his entire bedroom, have been transported to a place called "The Town," set in an alternate future inhabited by aliens. He navigates the environment in his bathrobe and teddy bear slippers in an attempt to resolve the mystery of why he has been kidnapped.

== History ==
The game was developed by Tim Furnish of Hungry Software and released in 2003. Originally intended to be a commercially released title, the game's developer decided at the last minute to release the game for free in order to showcase his video game engine called SLUDGE.

Around 2010 the SLUDGE engine was open sourced as LGPLv2.1 on GitHub, which allowed ports to alternative systems like the OpenPandora handheld.

== Reception ==
Out of Order received favorable reviews. Adventure Gamers wrote that the game possessed "very detailed and appealing graphics, an excellent original soundtrack, consistently humorous dialogue, very substantial length, and one of the most amusingly bizarre stories we've seen in a long time.".

In 2003 the game received the "Best Underground Game" award from Adventure Gamers and the Game of the Year award from The Crow's Nest.
