= Kit Williams =

English artist, illustrator and author

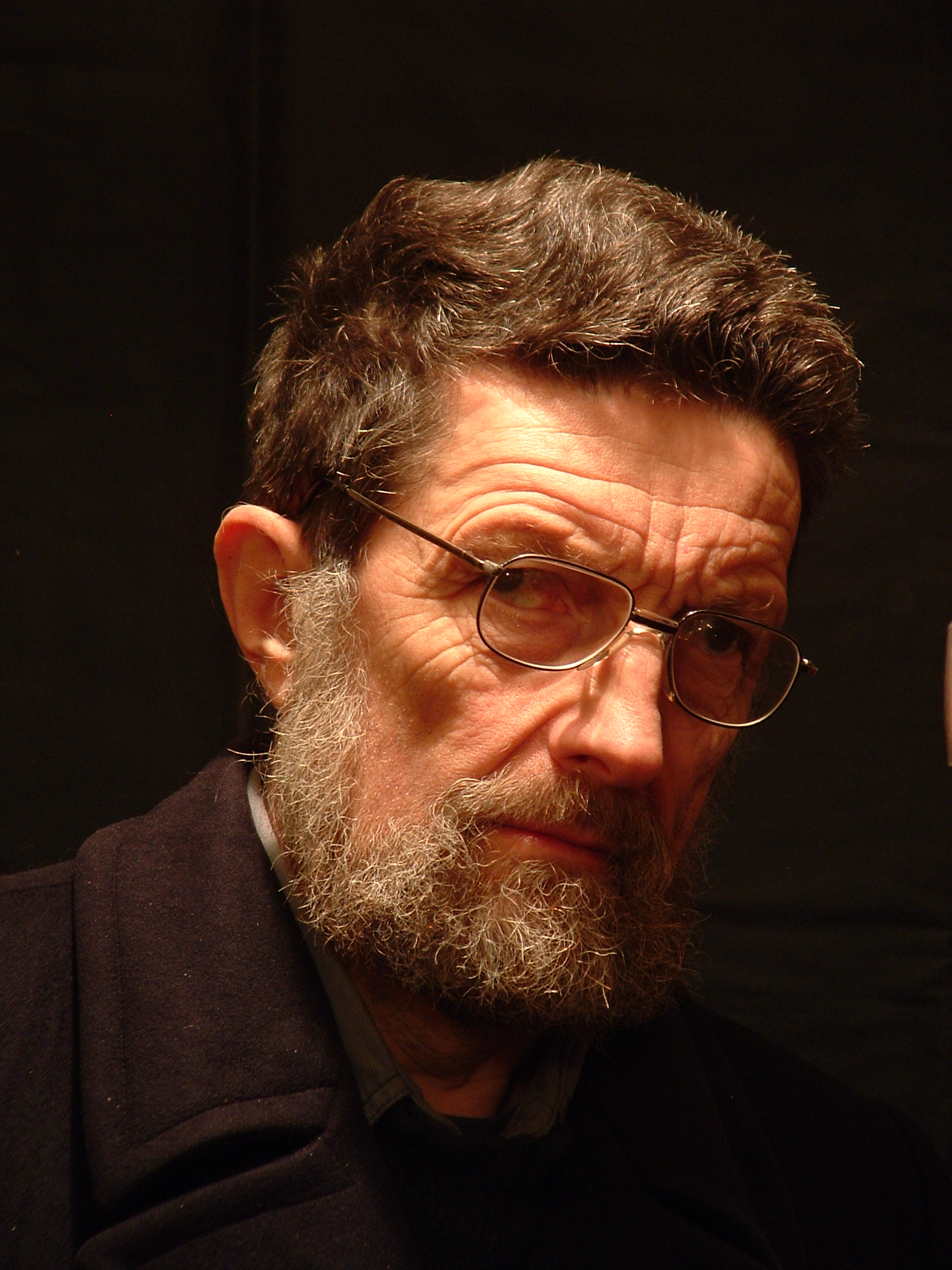
- Williams in February 2010
- Born: 28 April 1946 (age 79); Kent, England
- Known for: Painting, books, clocks

Christopher "Kit" Williams (born 28 April 1946) is an English artist, illustrator and author best known for his 1979 book Masquerade, a pictorial storybook which contains clues to the location of a golden (18 carat) jewelled hare created by Williams and then buried "somewhere in Britain".

Williams published three other books and was commissioned to create three public clocks with elaborate mechanisms and moving parts, such as animals, for visual interest.

Born in Kent, England, Williams continues to paint figurative art at his studio in Gloucestershire.

== Work ==
Kit Williams now primarily works as a figurative painter in which he uses traditional oil-painting techniques, fashioning first a wooden panel covered in linen and oil gesso. He then uses many layers of opaque and transparent Dutch oil paint to create luminous images.

Williams likes to maintain complete control of every aspect of his artwork including making the clothes worn by the models, creating sets and props, and often making mechanisms either within the frame or the painting that reveal moving elements of the artwork and encourage interaction by the viewer.

Using marquetry, he has always made his own frames which enables him to make pictures of any shape and allow elements of the picture to continue into the frame in often intricate detail.

== Past work ==
As well as his best-known book, Masquerade, Williams wrote The Bee on the Comb, a puzzle book with a bee theme. The book was initially published without a visible title, and readers were challenged to work out the title from clues inside the book and send in their answer without using the written word. This competition ran for just a year and a day, and the winner was revealed on the live BBC TV chatshow Wogan.

In 1985 Kit Williams designed the Wishing Fish Clock, a centrepiece of the Regent Arcade shopping centre in Cheltenham, Gloucestershire, England. More than 45 feet tall, the clock features a duck that lays a never-ending stream of golden eggs and includes a family of mice that are continually trying to evade a snake sitting on top of the clock. Hanging from the base of the clock is a large wooden fish that blows bubbles every half-hour. Catching one of these bubbles entitles you to make a wish, hence the name of the clock. The clock has undergone essential restoration work and is back in full working order as of 12 May 2017.

Other clocks designed by Williams can be found in Telford Shopping Centre and in the Midsummer Place section of Central Milton Keynes Shopping Centre.

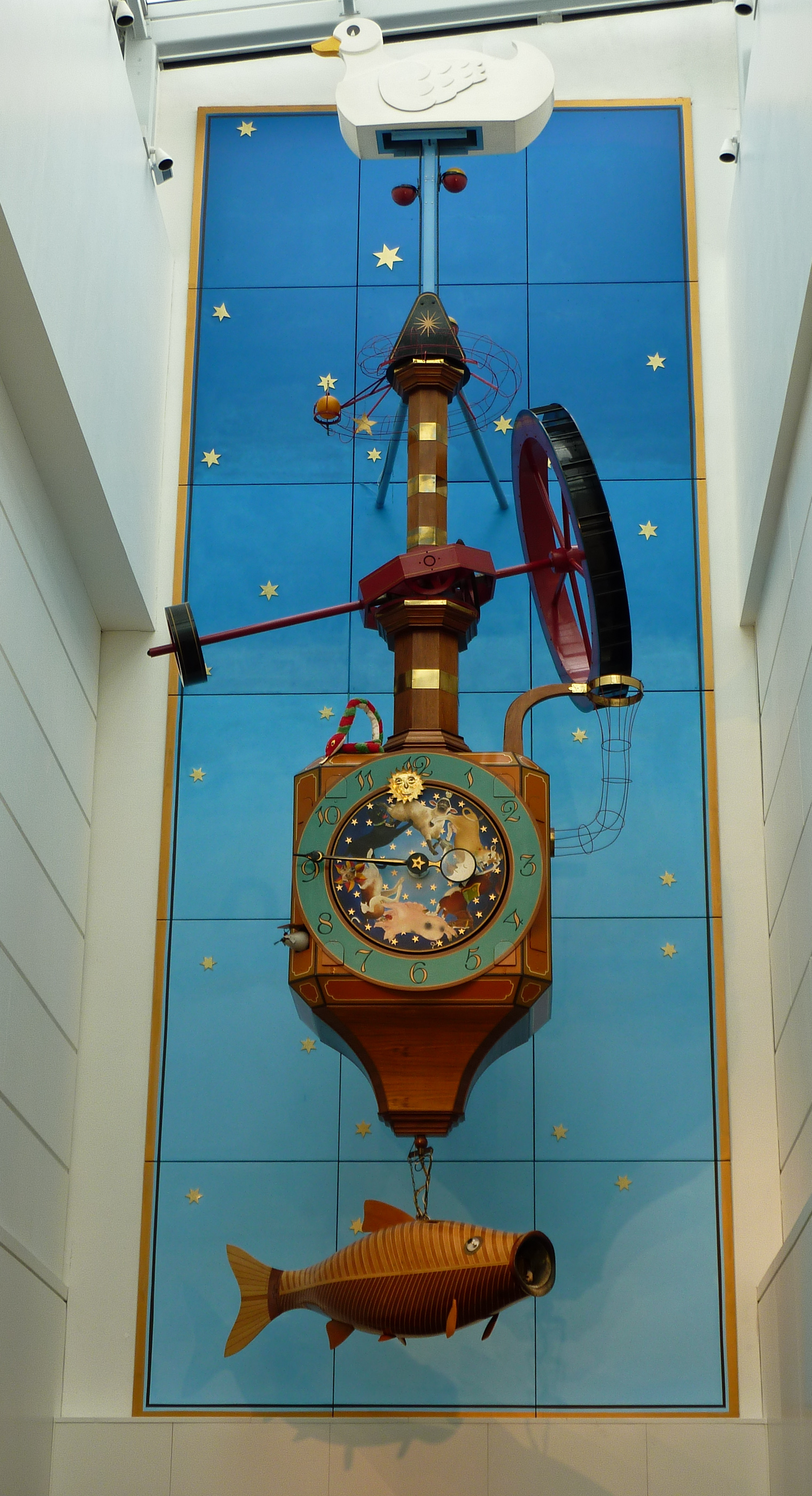
The Wishing Fish Clock, Regent Arcade, Cheltenham

Williams was also involved in the design of the Dragonfly Maze in Bourton-on-the-Water, Gloucestershire, England, which comprises a yew maze with a pavilion at the centre. The object is not only to reach the pavilion, but to gather clues as one navigates the maze. Correctly interpreting these clues when one reaches the pavilion allows access to the maze's final secret.

== Masquerade and the Golden Hare ==
In August 2009, Kit Williams was reunited with the golden hare from Masquerade, which he had not seen for more than 30 years. He was quoted as saying:

"I had not remembered it being as delicate as it is ... Then when I picked it up the little bells jingled, and it sparkled in a way that I had forgotten as well."

This reunion was revealed in a 60-minute documentary about Williams's work, The Man Behind the Masquerade, broadcast on BBC Four on 2 December 2009. The programme began with Masquerade and ended with an exhibition of the best 18 pieces of his art from the previous 30 years at the Portal Gallery, which had first exhibited his work in the 1970s. The programme showed Williams being reunited with the golden hare for the first time when it was loaned by its anonymous owner, who lives in East Asia.

The hare was on display at the V&A Museum, London, as part of its retrospective "British Design 1948–2012" from 31 March to 12 August 2012. It was sold by Sotheby’s auction house to a UK-based private collector in November 2025 for a hammer price of £82,550.

== Select bibliography ==
- Kit Williams, Masquerade, Jonathan Cape, 1979 ( ISBN 0-8052-3747-X )
- Kit Williams, Masquerade: The Complete Book with the Answer Explained, Jonathan Cape, 1982 [paperback] ( ISBN 0-89480-369-7 )
- Kit Williams, Book Without a Name (referred to by Williams as "the Bee Book"), Knopf, 1984 ( ISBN 0-394-53817-X )
- Kit Williams, Out of One Eye: The Art of Kit Williams, Crown, 1986 ( ISBN 0-517-56431-9 )
- Kit Williams, Engines of Ingenuity, Gingko Press, 2001 ( ISBN 1-58423-106-8 )
