= Scavenger hunt =

Game where participants race to find items or complete tasks

Scavenger hunt participants cross an item off their list

A scavenger hunt is a game in which the organizers prepare a list defining specific items that need to be found, which the participants seek to gather or complete all items on the list, usually without purchasing them. Participants typically work in small teams, although the rules may allow individuals to participate. The goal is to be the first to complete the list or to find the most items on that list. In variations of the game, players take photographs of listed items or are challenged to complete the tasks on the list in the most creative manner. A treasure hunt is another term for the game, but it may involve following a series of clues to find objects or a single prize in a particular order.

According to game scholar Markus Montola, scavenger hunts evolved from ancient folk games. Gossip columnist Elsa Maxwell popularized scavenger hunts in the United States with a series of exclusive New York parties starting in the early 1930s. The scavenger-hunt craze among New York's elite was satirized in the 1936 film My Man Godfrey, where one of the items socialite players are trying to collect is a "Forgotten Man", a homeless person.

== Examples ==
Scavenger hunts are regularly held at American universities, a notable modern example being the University of Chicago Scavenger Hunt, founded in 1987.

Scavenger hunts have been held with an increasingly large number of people around the world. In 2012, the Guinness World Records title for 'most participants in a treasure hunt game' was set by Team London Ambassadors, who broke the previous record (of 308 participants) in London. 466 participants, all London Ambassadors for the Olympic and Paralympic Games, worked in 93 teams of five, each completing a set of twelve clues hidden on either side of the River Thames, starting and finishing at City Hall, London. The treasure hunt in the form of a spy mission game formed part of World Record London for 2012. A separate points-based competition was held with one team emerging the winner of the 'treasure'.

An event organized by Escape Manor Inc. in Ottawa, Canada was held with 2,732 participants in 2017. In November 2023, a scavenger hunt was organized in South Korea and it currently holds the Guinness World Record for the world's largest scavenger hunt with 3,040 participants.

A form of scavenger hunt organized by GISH, described by Guinness World Records as the world's largest "media scavenger hunt", was held annually between 2011 and 2022. Tasks were posted on its website for participants to complete. It had 14,580 participants in 2013, and 55,000 in 2016.

The treasure hunt as a party game is attributed to socialite Elsa Maxwell. In 1944, she wrote: "In the Treasure Hunt [...] intellectual men were paired off with great beauties, glamor with talent. In the course of the night's escapades anything could happen."

=== Easter egg hunt ===
A common game played on Easter is the egg hunt, where players search for concealed eggs. The custom is believed to have originated in Germany in the 16th century and brought to the US in the 18th century and England in the 19th century. The game is usually played outdoors but may also be played indoors. The eggs may be hard-boiled and decorated, chocolate eggs, or artificial eggs containing various items, and hidden for children to find.

Halloween scavenger hunts have been moderately replacing trick-or-treating.

=== Letterboxing and geocaching ===
Letterboxing is an outdoor treasure hunt activity that combines elements of orienteering, art and problem-solving, and dates back to the 1850s. Letterboxers hide small, weatherproof boxes in publicly accessible places (such as parks or open moorland) and distribute clues to finding the box in printed catalogs, on one of several web sites, or by word of mouth. Individual letterboxes usually contain a logbook and a rubber stamp.

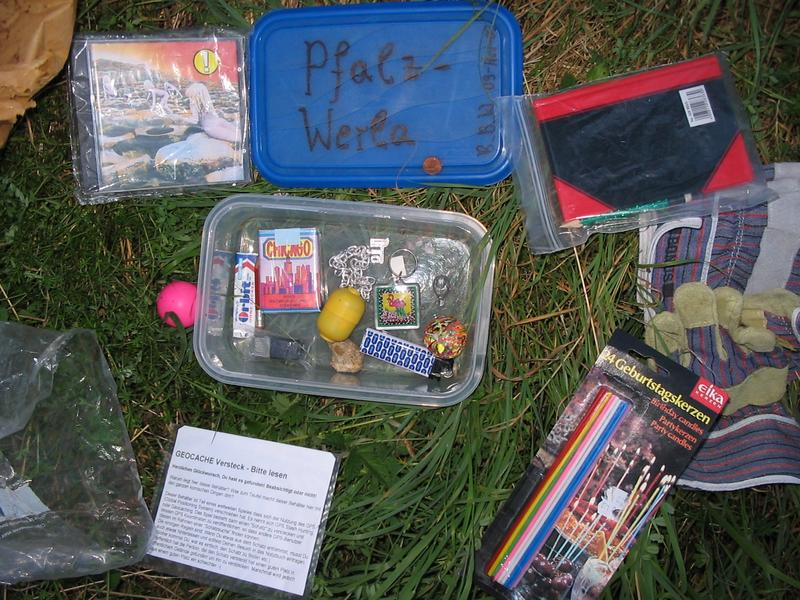
A Geocache in Germany

Geocaching is an outdoor treasure-hunting game in which the participants use a global positioning system (GPS) receiver or other navigational techniques to hide and seek containers (called "geocaches" or "caches").

=== Armchair treasure hunt ===
An armchair treasure hunt is an activity that requires solving puzzles or riddles in some easily portable and widely reproduced format (often an illustrated book), and then using clues hidden either in the story or in the graphics of the book to find a real treasure somewhere in the physical world. This type of treasure hunt may take months to solve and often has large prizes to be won. An early example of the genre is Kit Williams' 1979 book Masquerade while games still in play include The Secret. An unusual example of the armchair treasure hunt is the book MAZE: Solve the World's Most Challenging Puzzle by Christopher Mason, with the publishers awarding a prize of $10,000 USD to the reader who deciphered and solved a riddle using clues in the book's illustrations. Ultimately the prize was split among the twelve readers who came closest to the solution. The contest is now void, and MAZE is out of publication.

=== Television versions ===
In 1956, comedian Jan Murray created and hosted a variation for television, also known as Treasure Hunt. This US game show featured two contestants answering questions to qualify to go on a treasure hunt that involved choosing from among thirty treasure chests containing anything from gag prizes to valuable merchandise and/or cash. The show also offered home viewers a chance of a treasure hunt, when a postcard was chosen from a large drum by a young guest who revolved the drum several times to randomise the entries. The show aired daily in the morning and once a week in the evening until 1959, when networks began canceling game shows in the wake of the quiz show scandal.

In the United Kingdom, a show title Treasure Hunt was aired between 1982 and 1989, featuring two contestants solving a series of clues in a studio to direct a skyrunner in a helicopter looking for an object.

=== Walk-a-hunt ===
Walk-a-Hunt is an in-person and virtual reality (VR360) walking activity that combines the elements of a Scavenger hunt. It was launched at the AFT International Sports Fitness Festival. Four iterations of the walk have been produced with an accompanying 360-degree video format and is a form of inclusive recreation inspired by the creator's mother who has early-onset dementia.

== Internet and media scavenger hunts ==
Internet scavenger hunts invite participants to visit different websites to find clues and solve puzzles, occasionally for a prize. Participants can win prizes for correctly solving puzzles in treasure hunts. The first internet hunt was developed in 1992 by Rick Gates to encourage people to explore the resources available online. Several feature films and television series have used online scavenger hunts as viral marketing, including The Da Vinci Code and the Sci-Fi Channel's series The Lost Room. Actor Misha Collins currently holds the Guinness World Record for organizing GISHWHES, the world's largest media scavenger hunt which included 14,580 participants in 972 teams from 90 countries as participants. A 2012 hunt organized by eBay had prizes totaling $200,000. Many online hunts are subject to internet gaming laws that vary between jurisdictions.

Simulated treasure hunting might also be considered a minor video game genre; for example Colossal Cave Adventure, Zork and Pimania involve treasure hunts.

The explosion of mobile apps has led to an explosion in app-related scavenger hunts. Beyond the typical find and return method of a scavenger hunt, apps now allow for participants to snap photos, take videos, answer questions, GPS check-ins, scan QR codes, and do more directly in an app, vastly expanding the concept of what a scavenger hunt can be. Some companies, such as thesecret.city, have operated scavenger hunts through popular messaging apps like WhatsApp and Telegram.

Atop this, a new genre of game (Alternate Reality Games or ARGs for short) has popularized a real-life/internet hybrid form of scavenger hunts. In these, users worldwide collaborate to solve puzzles both on websites and in real world locations. These games unfold in real time and can run for weeks or even months.
