= The Secret (treasure hunt) =

Book treasure hunt started by Byron Priess

Cover of 1982 book The Secret

The Secret is a treasure hunt created by Byron Preiss. The hunt involves a search for twelve treasure boxes, the clues to which were provided in a book written by Preiss in 1982, also called The Secret. These boxes were buried at secret locations in cities across the United States and Canada that symbolically represent events and peoples that played significant roles in North American history. Anyone who uncovered one of the treasure boxes was entitled to exchange it with Preiss for a precious gem.

Preiss died in a car accident in 2005. His estate assumed the responsibility of honoring the terms of the treasure hunt. As of 2026, only three of the twelve boxes have been found. Preiss kept no record of the treasure boxes' exact locations before his death, leaving it a possibility that the remaining boxes may never be recovered.

== Book ==
Clues for where the treasures were buried are provided in a puzzle book named The Secret produced by Byron Preiss and first published by Bantam in 1982. The book was authored by Sean Kelly and Ted Mann and illustrated by John Jude Palencar, John Pierard, and Overton Loyd; JoEllen Trilling, Ben Asen, and Alex Jay also contributed to the book. A Japanese version was published in 1983, and the English version was re-issued in 2014. The book contains 12 images and 12 verses; an image must be linked to a verse, with the information they contain used to locate a buried "treasure casque".

The Secret book variants
Year	ISBN	Language	Format	Publisher
1982	ISBN 0-553-01408-0	English	Paperback	Bantam
1982	ISBN 0-553-01408-0	English	Hardcover	Bantam
1983	0276-831122-7339	Japanese	Paperback	Futami-shobo
2014	ISBN 978-1-59687-444-2	English	Hardcover	ibooks.com
2014	ISBN 978-1-59687-401-5	English	Paperback	ibooks.com

== Treasure boxes ==
As of 2024, three of the treasure boxes have been recovered. The first was found in Chicago, Illinois, the second in Cleveland, Ohio, and the most recent treasure box was found in Boston, Massachusetts. The remaining nine treasure boxes have not yet been recovered. The Boston treasure box's recovery was filmed for Discovery Channel's television show Expedition Unknown and aired on Wednesday, October 30, 2019, a recovery which only occurred due to the puzzle being featured in two previous episodes of the series.

Over time, some of the cached casques may have been destroyed, or been built over, as was happening with the Boston casque, which was buried in Langone Park, in Boston’s North End which was undergoing renovation, resulting in the casque being dug up by an excavator. Clues would no longer match in cases where the surrounding area has changed since the book was originally published. Similarly, boxes in places like New Orleans (which faced mass destruction due to Hurricane Katrina in 2005) and New York City (which has undergone major renovations since the 1980s) have become extremely difficult to track.

Note: This table is the consensus from the majority of searchers.

Image No.	Verse No.	Verse opening	Status	Location (solved, or likely)	Ref.
1	7	At stone wall's door	Unsolved	San Francisco, California	
2	6	Of all the romance retold	Unsolved	Charleston, South Carolina	
3	11	Pass two friends of octave	Unsolved	Elizabethan Garden, Roanoke Island, North Carolina	
4	4	Beneath two countries	Solved (2004)	Greek Garden, Cleveland, Ohio	
5	12	Where M and B are set in stone	Solved (1983)	Grant Park, Chicago, Illinois	
6	9	The first chapter	Unsolved	St. Augustine, Florida	
8	1	Fortress north	Unsolved	Hermann Park, Houston, Texas	
10	8	View the three stories of Mitchell	Unsolved	Milwaukee, Wisconsin	
9	5	Lane	Unsolved	Montreal, Quebec, Canada	
7	2	At the place where jewels abound	Unsolved	French Quarter/Lafayette, New Orleans, Louisiana	
11	3	If Thucydides is North of Xenophon	Solved (2019)	Puopolo Field, Boston, Massachusetts	
12	10	In the shadow Of the grey giant	Unsolved	Queens/Coney, New York, New York	

== Found treasures ==
=== Chicago ===
In 1983, just under a year after the book's publishing, teenagers Eric Gasiorowski, Rob Wrobel, and David James unearthed the box in Grant Park. The trio used the fifth image and the twelfth verse to locate the treasure. Gasiorowski first realized the box was in Chicago when he noticed that the windmill tower in the image was actually the Chicago Water Tower with windmills added. Wrobel stated in a 2018 interview with ABC that the three of them were "digging half a dozen holes in the ground of Grant Park. It's probably not a good idea." After unsuccessfully being able to locate the box, the group called Preiss asking for a hint to the exact location of the box. Preiss sent the group a photo of the "freshly patted down Earth" that the boys used as a map to dig their final hole. After digging a foot and a half and finding nothing, one of the boys threw their shovel on the ground, causing a slab of dirt to fall away and reveal the corner of the box. The boys were awarded with an emerald after mailing the key inside the box to Preiss.

=== Cleveland ===
In 2004, New Jersey lawyers Brian Zinn and Andy Abrams discovered the second box buried in the Greek Cultural Gardens in Rockefeller Park. The duo used the fourth image and the fourth verse to solve it. After discovering the upside-down outline of the Terminal Tower in the trees, the duo eventually made their way to a neglected flower bed in the gardens. As the verse described the location as "in a rectangular spot, beneath the tenth stone, from right to left", the duo dug on the left side for up to five hours. After getting frustrated, Abrams turned away from the bed and had the epiphany that when facing away from the bed, the orientation of the bed flipped. Using his realization, he dug on the other side of the bed, finding the box soon after. Abrams recorded a video of their excavation and discovery of the box, which can be found online. The two were later awarded an aquamarine gem.

=== Boston ===
In 2019, game-designer Jason Krupat and his family, along with Expedition Unknown host Josh Gates, discovered the third box in Langone Park, which was undergoing a complete redesign at the time. Krupat's children first brought the treasure to his attention after watching an episode of Expedition Unknown about the book. Jason then spent two years deciphering the location of the Boston treasure using image eleven and verse three. He soon deduced that the box was buried in Langone Park, which was undergoing a massive renovation. Worried, he alerted the site foreman that the workers could potentially damage or destroy the box, which the foreman dismissed. Krupat would give the foreman his phone number and sent him an email that explained what the box would look like if it were to be dug up. Months later, while digging up a baseball diamond in the park, the workers discovered shards of plexiglass and ceramic in the dirt. The foreman contacted Krupat, who in turn contacted Gates. Krupat, his family, and Gates then searched the site for the box with the help of the workers. After searching, Krupat found the ceramic key that was needed in order to obtain the gem. The group travelled to New York City to meet with the Preiss family, John Jude Palencar, and the finders of previous boxes. Krubat was awarded a peridot. The discovery and ceremony afterwards was featured in a 2019 episode of Expedition Unknown. While the authenticity of the find is debated by several online forums, the Preiss estate has confirmed that the find was legitimate.

== See also ==
- Masquerade (book)
- A Treasure's Trove
