= List of Tecmo games =

This is a list of video games developed and/or published by Tecmo, prior to its merger with Koei, released by Tecmo Koei under the Tecmo label or under its former name Tehkan. Some games were only published by Tecmo in a specific region or for a specific platform; these games will only list the publisher relevant to this list and will be notated appropriately. Also, many games have different release dates for different regions, platforms, or re-releases. For the purposes of simplicity, and to ensure easy automated sorting, only the earliest date is listed on this table.

Year	Title	Developer	Publisher	Platforms
2009	Aibou DS	Tecmo	Tecmo	Nintendo DS
1989	All Girl Wrestling: Ultimate Angels	Tecmo	Tecmo	Super Famicom, mobile phones
1988	Back Fire	Tecmo	Tecmo	Arcade
1989	Bad News Baseball	Tecmo	Tecmo	NES
Cancelled	BASTARD!! ONLINE	Shaft	Tecmo	Microsoft Windows
1984	Bomb Jack	Tehkan	Tehkan	Arcade
1986	Bomb Jack II	Tehkan	Tehkan	Arcade
Cancelled	Breaker	Tecmo	Tecmo	PlayStation 2
1988	Captain Tsubasa	Tecmo	Tecmo	Family Computer
1994	Captain Tsubasa	Tecmo	Tecmo	Mega-CD
1990	Captain Tsubasa 2	Tecmo	Tecmo	Family Computer
1992	Captain Tsubasa 3: Koutei no Chousen	Tecmo	Tecmo	Super Famicom
1993	Captain Tsubasa 4: Pro no Rival Tachi	Tecmo	Tecmo	Super Famicom
1994	Captain Tsubasa 5: Hasha no Shogo Campione	Tecmo	Tecmo	Super Famicom
1988	Dead Angle	Seibu Kaihatsu	Tecmo	Arcade
1996	Dead or Alive	Team Ninja	Tecmo	Arcade, Sega Saturn, PlayStation
1999	Dead or Alive 2	Team Ninja	Tecmo	Arcade, Dreamcast, PlayStation 2
2001	Dead or Alive 3	Team Ninja	Tecmo	Xbox
2005	Dead or Alive 4	Team Ninja	Tecmo	Xbox 360
2008	Dead or Alive Online	Team Ninja	Tecmo	Microsoft Windows
2004	Dead or Alive Ultimate	Team Ninja	Tecmo	Xbox
2003	Dead or Alive Xtreme Beach Volleyball	Team Ninja	Tecmo	Xbox
2006	Dead or Alive Xtreme 2	Team Ninja	Tecmo	Xbox 360
1999	Deception III: Dark Delusion	Tecmo	Tecmo	PlayStation
2005	Dokodemo Rasshou! Pachislo Sengen	Tecmo	Tecmo	PlayStation Portable
1994	Eight Forces	Tecmo	Tecmo	Arcade
2001	Fatal Frame	Tecmo	Tecmo	PlayStation 2, Xbox
2003	Fatal Frame II: Crimson Butterfly	Tecmo	Tecmo	PlayStation 2
2004	Fatal Frame II: Crimson Butterfly - Director's Cut	Tecmo	Tecmo	Xbox
2005	Fatal Frame III: The Tormented	Tecmo	Tecmo	PlayStation 2
2008	Fatal Frame: Mask of the Lunar Eclipse	Tecmo, Grasshopper Manufacture	Nintendo	Wii
1992	Final Star Force	Tecmo	Tecmo	Arcade
1996	Gallop Racer	Tecmo	Tecmo	Arcade, PlayStation
1997	Gallop Racer 2	Tecmo	Tecmo	Arcade, PlayStation
1999	Gallop Racer 3	Tecmo	Tecmo	Arcade, PlayStation
2000	Gallop Racer 2000	Tecmo	Tecmo	PlayStation
2001	Gallop Racer 2001	Tecmo	Tecmo	PlayStation 2
2002	Gallop Racer 2003: A New Breed	Tecmo	Tecmo	PlayStation 2
2004	Gallop Racer 2004	Tecmo	Tecmo	PlayStation 2
2006	Gallop Racer 2006	Tecmo	Tecmo	PlayStation 2
1995	Ganbare Ginkun	Tecmo	Tecmo	Arcade
1987	Gemini Wing	Tecmo	Tecmo	Arcade
2009	The Girls of Dead or Alive: Blackjack	Team Ninja	Tecmo	iOS
1985	Gridiron Fight	Tehkan	Tehkan	Arcade
2004	GunGriffon: Allied Strike	Game Arts	Tecmo	Xbox
1983	Guzzler	Tehkan	Tehkan	Arcade
1990	Head On	Tecmo	Tecmo	Game Boy
1997	J League Go Go Goal!	Tecmo	Tecmo	Sega Saturn
1998	Kagero: Deception II	Tecmo	Tecmo	PlayStation
1991	Karate Blazers	Video System	Tecmo	Arcade
1985	Lovely Cards	Tehkan	Tehkan	Arcade
1987	Mighty Bomb Jack	Tecmo	Tecmo	NES
1997	Monster Rancher	Tecmo	Tecmo	PlayStation
1999	Monster Rancher 2	Tecmo	Tecmo	PlayStation
2001	Monster Rancher 3	Tecmo	Tecmo	PlayStation 2
2003	Monster Rancher 4	Tecmo	Tecmo	PlayStation 2
2001	Monster Rancher Advance	Tecmo	Tecmo	Game Boy Advance
2002	Monster Rancher Advance 2	Tecmo	Tecmo	Game Boy Advance
1999	Monster Rancher Battle Card Game	GRC	Tecmo	Game Boy Color
2000	Monster Rancher Battle Card: Episode II	GRC	Tecmo	Game Boy Color
2008	Monster Rancher DS	Cing	Tecmo	Nintendo DS
2005	Monster Rancher EVO	Tecmo	Tecmo	PlayStation 2
2000	Monster Rancher Explorer	Tecmo	Tecmo	Game Boy Color
2000	Monster Rancher Hop-A-Bout	Tecmo	Tecmo	Arcade, PlayStation
2004	Monster Rancher POP	Tecmo	Tecmo	Mobile phones
2004	Monster Rancher POP 2	Tecmo	Tecmo	Mobile phones
2009	NBA Unrivaled	A.C.R.O.N.Y.M. Games	Tecmo	Xbox 360, PlayStation 3
2004	Ninja Gaiden	Team Ninja	Tecmo	Xbox
1988	Ninja Gaiden	Tecmo	Tecmo	Arcade
1989	Ninja Gaiden	Tecmo	Tecmo	NES
2008	Ninja Gaiden II	Team Ninja	Microsoft Game Studios	Xbox 360
1990	Ninja Gaiden II: The Dark Sword of Chaos	Tecmo	Tecmo	NES
1991	Ninja Gaiden III: The Ancient Ship of Doom	Tecmo	Tecmo	NES
2005	Ninja Gaiden Black	Team Ninja	Tecmo	Xbox
2008	Ninja Gaiden Dragon Sword	Team Ninja	Tecmo	Nintendo DS
2004	Ninja Gaiden Episode 1: Destiny	Tecmo	Tecmo	Mobile phones
2004	Ninja Gaiden Hurricane Pack: Volume I	Team Ninja	Tecmo	Xbox
2004	Ninja Gaiden: Hurricane Pack Vol. 2	Team Ninja	Tecmo	Xbox
1991	Ninja Gaiden Shadow	Tecmo/Natsume	Tecmo	Game Boy
2007	Ninja Gaiden Sigma	Team Ninja	Tecmo	PlayStation 3
2009	Ninja Gaiden Sigma 2	Team Ninja	Tecmo	PlayStation 3, PlayStation Vita
1995	Ninja Gaiden Trilogy	Tecmo	Tecmo	SNES
1995	Nōryoku Kōjō Iinkai	Tecmo	Tecmo	Arcade
1998	One on One Government	Jorudan	Tecmo	Arcade, PlayStation
2008	Oyaku de Asoberu DS Ehon: Ukkari Penelope	Tecmo	Tecmo	Nintendo DS
1985	Pinball Action	Tehkan	Tecmo	Arcade
1981	Pleiads	Tehkan	Tehkan	Arcade
2010	Quantum Theory	Team Tachyon	Tecmo	PlayStation 3, Xbox 360
1992	Quiz Kokology	Tecmo	Tecmo	Arcade
1993	Quiz Kokology 2	Tecmo	Tecmo	Arcade
1991	Radia Senki: Reimeihen	Tecmo	Tecmo	Family Computer
2003	Rasshou! Pachislo Sengen	Tecmo	Tecmo	PlayStation 2
2004	Rasshou! Pachislo Sengen 2: Dekadan	Tecmo	Tecmo	PlayStation 2
2005	Rasshou! Pachislo Sengen 3: Rio de Carnival, Juujika 600 Shiki	Tecmo	Tecmo	PlayStation 2
2006	Rasshou! Pachislo Sengen 4: Shin Mogu Mogu Fuurinkasan Rio de Carnival	Tecmo	Tecmo	PlayStation 2
2007	Rakushou! Pachi-Slot Sengen 5: Rio Paradise	Tecmo	Tecmo	PlayStation 2
2007	Rakushou! Pachi-Slot Sengen 6: Rio 2 Cruising Vanadis	Tecmo	Tecmo	PlayStation 2
2004	Real: Another Edition	Tecmo	Tecmo	Mobile phones
2004	Right Brain Game	Tecmo	Tecmo	Mobile phones
1992	Riot	Tecmo	NMK	Arcade
1986	Rygar	Tecmo	Tecmo	Arcade, X68000, Commodore 64, ZX Spectrum, NES, Master System, Lynx, mobile phones
2008	Rygar: The Battle of Argus	Team Tachyon	Tecmo	Wii
2002	Rygar: The Legendary Adventure	Tecmo	Tecmo	PlayStation 2
1992	Saboten Bombers	NMK	Tecmo	Arcade
2009	Sasami Kisscomi	Team Tachyon	Tecmo	iOS
1983	Senjyo	Tehkan	Tehkan	Arcade, MSX, Xbox
1988	Silk Worm	Tecmo	Tecmo	Arcade, Amiga, Amstrad CPC, Atari ST, Commodore 64, Nintendo Entertainment System, ZX Spectrum
1991	Solomon's Club	Tecmo	Tecmo	Game Boy
1986	Solomon's Key	Tecmo	Tecmo	Arcade, Amiga, Amstrad CPC, Atari ST, Commodore 64, MS-DOS, Famicom Disk System, Master System, mobile phones, NES, ZX Spectrum
1993	Solomon's Key 2	Tecmo	Tecmo	NES
1991	Soreike Kokology	Sega	Sega/Tecmo	Arcade
1993	Soreike Kokology 2	Sega	Sega/Tecmo	Arcade
2008	SPRay	Eko System	Tecmo	Wii
1984	Star Force	Tehkan	Tehkan	Arcade, NES
1991	Strato Fighter	Tecmo	Tecmo	Arcade, Xbox
1991	Strike Gunner S.T.G	Athena	Tecmo	Arcade, Super NES
1991	Super Pinball Action	Tecmo	Tecmo	Arcade
1994	Super Sangokushi	Tecmo	Tecmo	SNES
1991	Super Sangokushi 2	Tecmo	Tecmo	SNES
2002	Super Shot Soccer	Tecmo	Tecmo	PlayStation
1986	Super Star Force: Jikūreki no Himitsu	Tecmo	Tecmo	Family Computer
2006	Super Swing Golf	Ntreev Soft/Tecmo	Tecmo	Wii
2007	Super Swing Golf: Season 2	Team Tachyon	Tecmo	Wii
1982	Swimmer	Tehkan	Tecmo	Arcade
1989	Tecmo Baseball	Tecmo	Tecmo	NES
1987	Tecmo Bowl	Tecmo	Tecmo	Arcade, NES, Game Boy
2008	Tecmo Bowl: Kickoff	Polygon Magic	Tecmo	Nintendo DS
2010	Tecmo Bowl Throwback	Southend Interactive/Tecmo	Tecmo	Xbox 360, PlayStation 3
2005	Tecmo Classic Arcade	Tecmo	Tecmo	Xbox
1988	Tecmo Cup Soccer Game	Tecmo	Tecmo	NES
2004	Tecmo Hit Parade	Tecmo	Tecmo	PlayStation 2
1989	Tecmo Knight	Tecmo	Tecmo	Arcade
1992	Tecmo NBA Basketball	Tecmo	Tecmo	NES
1993	Tecmo's Secret of the Stars	Tecmo	Tecmo	SNES
2006	Tecmo Sports: Bakuretsu King	Tecmo	Tecmo	PlayStation 2
1995	Tecmo Stackers	Tecmo	Tecmo	Arcade, PlayStation
1994	Tecmo Super Baseball	Tecmo	Tecmo	Super NES, Sega Genesis
1991	Tecmo Super Bowl	Tecmo	Tecmo	NES
1994	Tecmo Super Bowl II: Special Edition	Tecmo	Tecmo	SNES, Mega Drive
1995	Tecmo Super Bowl III: Final Edition	Tecmo	Tecmo	SNES, Mega Drive
1994	Tecmo Super Hockey	Tecmo	Tecmo	Sega Genesis
1992	Tecmo Super NBA Basketball	Tecmo	Tecmo	SNES, Sega Genesis
1989	Tecmo World Cup '90	Tecmo	Tecmo	Arcade, Mega Drive
1992	Tecmo World Cup '92	Tecmo	Tecmo	Mega Drive
1993	Tecmo World Cup '93	SIMS	Sega/Tecmo	Master System
1994	Tecmo World Cup '94	Tecmo	Tecmo	Arcade
1998	Tecmo World Cup '98	Tecmo	Tecmo	Arcade
2000	Tecmo World Cup Millennium	Tecmo	Tecmo	Arcade
1990	Tecmo World Cup Soccer	Tecmo	Tecmo	NES
1996	Tecmo World Golf	Tecmo	Tecmo	PlayStation
1996	Tecmo World Soccer '96	SNK	Tecmo	Neo Geo
1989	Tecmo World Wrestling	Tecmo	Tecmo	NES
1996	Tecmo's Deception: Invitation to Darkness	Tecmo	Tecmo	PlayStation
1986	Tee'd Off	Tecmo	Tecmo	Arcade
1985	Tehkan World Cup	Tecmo	Tecmo	Arcade, PlayStation 2, Xbox
1991	Thunder Dragon	NMK	Tecmo	Arcade
1996	Tōkidenshō Angel Eyes	Tecmo	Tecmo	Arcade, PlayStation
2005	Tokobot	Tecmo	Tecmo	PlayStation Portable
2006	Tokobot Plus: Mysteries of the Karakuri	Tecmo	Tecmo	PlayStation 2
1999	Tondemo Crisis	Polygon Magic	Tecmo	Arcade, PlayStation
2005	Trapt	Tecmo	Tecmo	PlayStation 2
1987	Tsuppari Ōzumō	Tecmo	Tecmo	Family Computer
1993	Tsuppari Ōzumō: Risshin Shusse Hen	Tecmo	Tecmo	Super Famicom
2009	Undead Knights	Team Tachyon	Tecmo	PlayStation Portable
2000	UNiSON	Tecmo	Tecmo	PlayStation 2
1994	V Goal Soccer	Tecmo	Tecmo	Arcade
1996	V-Goal Soccer '96	Tecmo	Tecmo	3DO
1991	Vimana	Toaplan	Tecmo	Arcade
1992	Zing Zing Zip	Allumer	Tecmo	Arcade

== See also ==
- List of Koei games
- List of Koei Tecmo games
