= Champion Jockey =

The title champion jockey may refer to:

- British jump racing Champion Jockey
- British flat racing Champion Jockey
- Irish flat racing Champion Jockey
- Irish jump racing Champion Jockey
- United States Champion Jockey by wins
- United States Champion Jockey by earnings
- French flat racing Champion Jockey
- Champion Jockey: G1 Jockey & Gallop Racer
