= Rio: Rainbow Gate! =

Japanese anime television series

- First DVD cover, featuring Rio Rollins Tachibana
- Genre: Comedy, gambling
- Created by: Koei Tecmo Wave
- Anime television series
- Directed by: Takao Kato
- Produced by: Shinji Horikiri
- Written by: Mayori Sekijima
- Music by: Atsushi Umebori
- Studio: Xebec
- Licensed by: NA: Media Blasters
- Original network: Tokyo MX, TVA, MBS, BS11, AT-X
- English network: US: Toku
- Original run: January 4, 2011 – March 29, 2011
- Episodes: 13 + 1
- icon

Rio: Rainbow Gate! is a Japanese anime television series animated by Xebec. Based on Koei Tecmo's Rio series of pachinko games (from Rakushou! Pachi-Slot Sengen), the series revolves around titular character Rio Rollins, a popular casino dealer working at the Howard Resort who is known as the "Goddess of Victory", and the thirteen cards called Gates which are used to determine the world's most skilled dealer. The anime aired on Tokyo MX and related channels between January and March 2011.

== Plot ==
In an island casino called the Howard Resort (ハワードリゾート, Hawādo Rizōto), Rio Rollins is a popular casino dealer with the ability to bring good luck to gamblers just by walking past them, earning her the nickname "The Goddess of Victory". Mint Clark, a young child, comes to the Howard Resort with her grandfather and encounters Rio, and the two become the best of friends.

Rio's life soon changes when it is revealed that she is a "Gate Holder", a dealer who holds one of the 13 legendary cards called "Gates", and whoever collects them all will be named "Most Valuable Casino Dealer" (MVCD). To collect all 13 Gates, Rio must take part in special matches called "Gate Battles" with other Gate Holders and gain their Gates to become the most valuable casino dealer in the world.

== Characters ==
=== Main characters ===
Rio Rollins Tachibana (リオ・ロリンズ・タチバナ, Rio Rorinzu Tachibana)
Voiced by: Marina Inoue (Japanese); Amber Lee Connors (English)
Rio Rollins is a dealer at the Howard Resort casino, renowned for her beauty and her operating motto, "As the customer wishes" (お客様がお望みなら, Okyaku-sama ga onozomi nara). Her mysterious energy brings good fortune to patrons, earning her the title "The Goddess of Victory" (勝利の女神, Shōri no Megami). She is the daughter of legendary dealer Risa Rollins, from whom she inherits her exceptional skill. Rio is a "Roll Ruler", capable of altering the outcome of a Gate Battle using illusions. After a series of conflicts with other dealers, she eventually claims all thirteen Gates, attaining the title of MVCD and the power of the Ultimate Roll Ruler.
Mint Clark (ミント・クラーク, Minto Kurāku)
Voiced by: Ayana Taketatsu (Japanese); Amanda Julina (English)
A young girl who comes to the Howard Resort with her grandfather. She always carries around with her a stuffed bear named Choco.
Rina Goltschmidt Tachibana (リナ・ゴルトシュミット・タチバナ, Rina Gorutoshumitto Tachibana)
Voiced by: Chiaki Takahashi (Japanese); Brittany Lauda (English)
Rina is Rio Rollins's childhood friend and fellow dealer, raised alongside her by Risa Rollins after her own mother was hospitalized. Possessing a mysterious energy that wearies her customers, she contrasts with Rio's invigorating presence. Rina is later revealed to be Rio's half-sister, working for their aunt Cartia. She seeks revenge against Rio and Risa, whom she blames for her mother Ilina's coma. A powerful Roll Ruler, Rina initially holds nine Gates and commands superior abilities, but is ultimately defeated by Rio in their final confrontation.

=== Howard Resort staff members ===
Tom Howard (トム・ハワード, Tomu Hawādo)
Voiced by: Kōji Ishii (Japanese); Mike Pollock (English)
The owner of Howard Resort, donning a yellow suit with a large red bowtie and is often seen smoking a cigar. He tends to show a rather perverted nature, usually concerning the exposure of Rio's body by having her dress in embarrassing outfits. He later loses the Howard Resort following Rio's loss at a Gate Battle with Rina, but wins it back following Rio's victory and her gaining the MVCD title.
Rosa Canyon (ローザ・キャニオン, Rōza Kyanion)
Voiced by: Kaori Shimizu (Japanese); Natalie Van Sistine (English)
A Hollywood actress who works as a dealer at Howard Resort. Despite her movie status, she admits her popularity pales in comparison to Rio's. She was possessed by Misery's ghost in episode 3, and was later freed from her control after the latter's loss. However, it is later revealed that Misery's spirit still resides in her body, as shown in episode 9 when she takes control of Rosa's body to warn Rio of her castle being on the verge of being demolished by Cartia and in episode 12 during a ping-pong match with the other girls in a hot spring.
Elle Adams (エル・アダムズ, Eru Adamuzu) and Ille Adams (イル・アダムズ, Iru Adamuzu)
Voiced by: Aya Uchida (Japanese); Amanda Lee (Elle), Caitlynn French (Ille) (English)
Twin sisters who work at the resort, both donning bunny suits. Elle usually provides explanation to Rio's abilities while Ille usually stays quiet, often just repeating the last word that was said.
Tiffany Abbot (ティファニー・アッボット, Tifanī Abbotto)
Voiced by: Saki Nakajima (Japanese); Melissa Sternenberg (English)
A bunny girl working at the Howard Resort.
Anya Helsing (アーニャ・ヘルシング, Ānya Herushingu)
Voiced by: Yukari Fukui (Japanese); Natalie Hoover (English)
A new recruit from Russia who is training to become a dealer. Although her dealer skills are quite good, she is rather clumsy and sometimes causes havoc in the casino.
Dana (ダーナ, Dāna)
Voiced by: Minori Chihara (Japanese); Michelle Rojas (English)
A magician and fortune teller at the Howard Resort, Linda uses tarot cards to predict futures for customers. She is later revealed to be a Gate Holder in possession of the #8 Gate.
Linda (リンダ, Rinda) / LINDA-R-2007
Voiced by: Yōko Hikasa (Japanese); Sarah Anne Williams (English)
A cheerful robot, Dana serves as the head dealer and central computer terminal for the Sky Resort, controlling the entire facility. She is briefly reprogrammed by Jack to challenge Rio Rollins to a Gate Battle for the #4 Gate, which is hidden in her left wrist. Dana loses the contest when her head detaches just before crossing the finish line, a recurring malfunction that frequently causes glitches throughout the resort's systems.

=== Antagonists ===
Cartia Goltschmidt (カルティア・ゴルトシュミット, Karutia Gorutoshumitto)
Voiced by: Sayaka Ohara (Japanese); Marissa Lenti (English)
Cartia is an ambitious and manipulative dealer from Germany who seeks to claim the Howard Resort through Gate Battles. She is Rina's aunt and aids her niece's quest for revenge against Rio Rollins. Cartia's ultimate goal is to collect all the Gates, allegedly to "see a rainbow", and she collaborates with the Casino Guild to strengthen her position. After Rio's temporary defeat, she successfully takes over the resort, renaming it the Goltschmidt Kingdom (ゴルトシュミットキングダム, Gorutoshumitto Kingudamu), but loses control following Rio's final victory.
Bull Hard (ブル・ハード, Buru Hādo)
Voiced by: Tetsu Inada (Japanese); Billy Bob Thompson (English)
An American cowboy who is the self-proclaimed "Master of Lottery Vending Machines" (自販機クジの達人). He held Anya hostage and challenged Rio to a game, only to lose when he later challenges to a drinking contest with a hot drink. He is later revealed to be one of Cartia's henchmen when he was given back his pistol by the latter, and later returns at the Sky Resort to carry out Cartia's plan.
Queen (クイーン, Kuīn)
Voiced by: Yū Asakawa (Japanese); Michele Knotz (English)
A Gate Holder known as the Merciless Queen (無慈悲のQ（クィーン）) and an expert sniper, holding the Queen Gate. She challenged Rio to a Gate Battle involving shooting targets inside a wind tunnel following the latter's previous battle with Jack. She initially had the upper hand due to her sniper abilities, and attempted to cheat by knocking Rio out, but lost following an incident involving Linda's head being knocked off by Anya which caused the wind tunnel to shut down momentarily, allowing Rio to claim victory once it was turned back on.
King (キング, Kingu)
Voiced by: Eiji Takemoto (Japanese); Matt Shipman (English)
A Gate Holder known as the Strong-Armed King (豪腕のK（キング）), holding the King Gate. He is a professional con artist who often wins guessing games by crushing objects in his hand so they will not be picked. Despite his strength, he is not very bright.
Yang-Yang (ヤンヤン, Yan'yan) and An-An (アンアン, An'an)
Voiced by: Asuka Ōgame (Yang-Yang) (Japanese); Cheryl Li (Yang-Yang) (English)
Of Chinese descent and wearing jiangshi outfits, Yang-Yang and An-An are twin sisters. Yang-Yang is the Gate Holder for the #10 Gate, while the silent An-An communicates only through the talisman on her hat. They challenge Rio and Mint to a game inside the volatile Concentration Bomber. After their defeat, it is revealed that An-An is not human but is actually Choco, a doll brought to life by Yang-Yang's magic, which only works on items made in China.
Charlie (チャーリー, Chārī)
Voiced by: Yasuhiko Kawazu (Japanese); Nick Landis (English)
The leader of the Casino Guild's radical faction.

=== Other characters ===
Clark (クラーク, Kurāku)
Voiced by: Katsumi Chou (Japanese); Todd Haberkorn (English)
Mint's grandfather and a wealthy millionaire.
Orlin Dunhill (オーリン・ダンヒル, Ōrin Danhiru)
Voiced by: Wataru Takagi (Japanese); Jason Marnocha (English)
A gambler known as the Queen Killer (クィーンキラー, Kuīn Kirā), Orlin initially challenges Rio Rollins to a closed poker match to win Mint's prized teddy bear. He loses after failing to draw four queens against Rio's winning pair of twos. He collects stuffed animals to cope with a past heartbreak, having been left at the altar. Orlin later reappears with Elvis for a rematch against Rio, but is defeated once more.
Elvis (エルビス, Erubisu)
Voiced by: Hiroki Takahashi (Japanese); Vic Mignogna (English)
A narcissistic Gate Holder of the #3 Gate, Elvis is a skilled mathematician who believes numbers are always on his side. Surrounded by admirers, he challenges Rio Rollins to a giant roulette Gate Battle. His initial advantage is lost when a bandage on his finger interferes with his throw, leading to his defeat. Elvis later reappears with Orlin for a rematch against Rio at the Goltschmidt Kingdom but is defeated again.
Misery (ミザリィ, Mizaryi)
Voiced by: Eri Kitamura
A ghost who once lost her castle and casino in a game of craps, Misery is resurrected when lightning strikes her former home. Her presence brings misfortune to gamblers, a power opposite to Rio Rollins's lucky aura. She possesses Rosa's body and challenges Rio for control of the Howard Resort. Using powerful illusions, Misery initially gains the upper hand until a distraction from Rina allows Rio to win. Misery continues to reside within Rosa, using her form to warn Rio of threats and aid her in subsequent conflicts.
Risa Rollins (リサ・ロリンズ, Risa Rorinzu) / Joker (ジョーカー, Jōkā)
Voiced by: Kikuko Inoue (Japanese); Meli Grant (English)
Risa Rollins is a legendary dealer formerly known as the Double Rs (ダブル・アール, Daburu Āru) and the previous MVCD. After disappearing from public view, she disguises herself as Joker, the masked holder of the #2 Gate, to evade the Casino Guild and protect her daughter, Rio. She is a powerful Roll Ruler, capable of creating vast illusions like a replica of the entire Howard Resort. Rina, her adopted daughter, blames Risa for an alleged affair that caused her biological mother, Ilina, to fall into a coma.
Jack Mighty (ジャック・マイティ, Jakku Maiti)
Voiced by: Yumiko Kobayashi (Japanese); Kira Buckland (English)
Jack is a young boy and Gate Holder with the telekinetic "Mighty Power" (マイティパワー, Maiti Pawā). Orphaned after his parents, who were part of a bomb disposal squad, died, he is taken in and manipulated by Cartia. He initially uses his powers on her behalf, such as reprogramming the dealer Linda, but is defeated by Rio Rollins in a Space Pinball Gate Battle. Jack later allies with Rio to save Mint from danger, and a mutual affection is hinted at between the two youngsters.
Carlos Tanaka (カルロス 田中, Karurosu Tanaka)
Voiced by: Daisuke Kishio (Japanese); Anthony Sardinha (English)
An Afro samurai who has the worst streak of bad luck at the resort.
Ilina Tachibana (イリーナ・タチバナ, Irīna Tachibana)
Voiced by: Ami Koshimizu (Japanese); Emily Fajardo (English)
Rina's mother and Cartia's sister. She is a weak and frail person who fell into a life-threatening coma after learning that her husband is having an affair with Risa.
Ray (レイ, Rei)
Voiced by: Kazuhiko Inoue (Japanese); Howard Wang (English)
Rio and Rina's father, who is an executive officer of the Casino Guild.
Nina (ニーナ, Nīna)

== Release ==
The series, produced by Xebec, is directed by Takao Kato, written by Mayori Sekijima, produced by Shinji Horikiri, character design by Hisashi Shimura, and music by Atsushi Umebori. The anime aired on Tokyo MX between January 4 and March 29, 2011, with subsequent broadcasts on TV Aichi, Mainichi Broadcasting System, Inc., Nico Nico Channel, BS NTV, and AT-X. Crunchyroll provides simulcasts of the series on their website to their paid subscribers, with others seeing it a week later. The series was released on seven DVD and Blu-ray volumes between April 29 and October 19, 2011, the last of which contains a bonus episode. The opening theme for the series is "Let's Spin the World Together!" (世界と一緒にまわろうよ！, Sekai to Issho ni Mawarō yo!) by the Love Roulettes, consisting of Marina Inoue (Rio), Ayana Taketatsu (Mint), Chiaki Takahashi (Rina), and Yōko Hikasa (Linda), while the ending theme is "Miracle☆Chance" (みらくる☆ちゃんす, Mirakuru Chansu) by ULTRA-PRISM. CD singles of the songs were released on January 26, 2011, by Universal Music.

The anime was licensed in North America by Media Blasters in 2013 and released on DVD, in Japanese with English subtitles, on March 25, 2014. The Media Blasters version began streaming on Ani.me in 2017. The series premiered on Toku in the United States as the first program to air on the network at the time of its launch on December 31, 2015.

=== Episodes ===
No.	Title	Original release date
1	"Goddess of Victory" "Goddesu obu Vikutorī" (ゴッデス オブ ヴィクトリー)	January 4, 2011
Mint Clark goes on holiday with her grandfather to the Howard Resort. While her grandfather enjoys the casino, Mint explores the resort and eventually meets the casino's most famous dealer, Rio Rollins Tachibana. As Rio and Mint go for a walk, they are approached by a man and his henchmen who attempt to take Mint's teddy bear, Choco, but Rio fights them off. After Mint bears witness to the good fortune that Rio brings to her customers in the casino, they are once again approached by the man, Orlin Dunhill, who decides to play a game of closed poker against Rio for Mint's bear. Orlin makes a gamble to get four Queens though, but thanks to Rio's ability to communicate with her cards, he loses out to Rio who wins with a pair of twos. Afterward, Orlin explains he had been collecting rare stuffed animals to fulfill his sorrow from being dumped at the altar, only to then find that Mint's bear is not a Belgium original.
2	"Gate Holder" "Gēto Horudā" (ゲート ホルダー)	January 11, 2011
Rio is asked to train a new recruit named Anya Helsing to be a dealer. Anya is quick to point out that Rio owns a "Gate", one of thirteen rare cards that are wagered in battles with other "Gate Holders" to determine the strongest dealer in the world. Although her dealer skills are quite good, she is rather clumsy, causing some chaos in the casino. Meanwhile, a Gate Holder named Elvis comes to challenge Rio to a Gate Battle set on a giant roulette table. Although Elvis has confidence is his prediction of numbers, he ultimately loses to Rio when a bandage he was wearing on his finger comes off while throwing the ball, allowing Rio to guess correctly and win his gate.
3	"Misery" "Mizaryi" (ミザリィ)	January 18, 2011
Howard takes Rio to a supposedly haunted castle which used to feature a casino owned by a woman named Misery, with plans to refurbish it as part of the Howard Resort. During the stormy night, lightning strikes the castle, which frees the ghost of Misery, who goes to the Howard Casino and spreads bad luck. She attempts to win the casino in a game with Anya, but instead falls victim to her clumsiness and freaks out. Misery later attacks a chicken wing delivery van, and when employees El and Il Adams discover her, they are attacked too. The next night, Rio gets a call from fellow employee Rosa Canyon, who had been possessed by Misery's spirit. Upon returning to the castle, Rio finds Misery, who challenges her to a game for the Howard Resort, having already taken control of El and Il and kidnapped Howard. The game involves betting to see if the dice will land on an odd or even number, but Rio is troubled by Misery's illusions. However, they are dispelled when Misery eats a super-spicy chicken wing she got from a mysterious delivery girl, allowing Rio to win the game and free Rosa. As Rio chases after the delivery girl, she reveals herself as her childhood friend, Rina, who has also been recruited by Howard.
4	"Sisters" "Shisutāzu" (シスターズ)	January 25, 2011
Rio takes Rina on a tour of the resort, introducing to the other employees. Rina also notes that Rio is a Gate Holder, mentioning how Rio's mother, Risa Rollins, once owned all 13 Gates. Their date is cut short when a man named Bull Hard takes Anya hostage. He challenges Rio to a vending machine lottery game, but is easily defeated when he tries challenging her to a drinking contest with a hot drink. The next day Rina begins work as a dealer, and her aura seems to make customers weary. Howard then decides to put both Rio and Rina in a game of clay pigeon shooting where players lose items of clothing if they miss; this task made tougher by the wind created by the excited customers. When Rio is at a disadvantage due to the appearance of seagulls during her turn, Rina throws her final turn, ending the match in a draw. Later that night, Howard gets ready for an opportunity with a robotic girl named Linda while Bull is seen talking to a mysterious woman interested in Rio's powers.
5	"Sky Resort" "Sukai Rizōto" (スカイリゾート)	February 1, 2011
Howard sends Rio, Rina and Anya to work at the Sky Resort casino situated at the top of a mountain. Once there, they meet the resort's dealer, Linda, who gives them a tour of the facilities. She is soon revealed to be a robot, and the resort's main terminal. The resort opens the next day, floating itself and its customers high into the sky. Just then, a boy reprograms Linda to challenge Rio to a Gate Battle in which they must both race each other down a giant water slide. The match is a close call throughout, with Linda manipulating the course to catch up; however, Rio wins when Linda loses her head. After the boy relinquishes control of Linda, the mastermind, Cartia Goltschmidt, approaches Howard.
6	"Roll Ruler" "Rōru Rūrā" (ロールルーラー)	February 8, 2011
Howard informs Rio, Rina and the others that Cartia had challenged Rio to a Gate Battle against someone named Jack with Howard Resort on the line. Mint asks Linda to draw the culprit who manipulated her data, which leads her to suspect Carlos Tanaka, an Afro samurai with terrible luck, as the culprit. Meanwhile, Rio, who has been getting a lot of silent calls lately, is shocked to find Misery's portrait in her room. As Mint follows Carlos, her bear almost falls off the resort but is rescued by a boy with telekinetic powers who is revealed to be Rio's opponent, Jack Mighty. Jack challenges Rio to a game of Space Pinball for the Gate. Before the match, Mint talks with Jack, who reveals he used to be in a bomb disposal family before he was taken in by Cartia, who just wants to use him for his powers, saying he will be free if he wins against Rio. During the match, Jack gets the advantage due to his powers but is soon overwhelmed when holographic sharks appear. Rio helps him escape the sharks, but he attacks her ship. However, Rio exits her ship and gets her own back to take the lead and win the match. However, when Carlos accidentally knocks Linda's head off, it activates a more dangerous phase which puts Mint in danger, so Rio and Jack work together to help her and stop the malfunction.
7	"Antlion" "Antoraion" (アントライオン)	February 15, 2011
Only two hours after the battle against Jack, Howard reveals another Gate Battle will take place against a woman named Queen despite Rio being exhausted from the last battle. The battle sees Rio and Queen flying up a wind tunnel while shooting targets. Meanwhile, the others learn that Cartia had hacked the Sky Resort's computers, preventing them from landing, with Jack revealing Cartia will not release it until Rio loses. Queen attempts to cheat to get an advantage over Rio, but another incident involving Linda's head falling off again turns it around for Rio. With Rio physically exhausted from her battle, Rina looks after her and takes her to a bathhouse, where Rio feels someone is watching her. Afterwards, Rina is taken hostage while Rio is locked in the hologram room, facing against dangerous physical holograms which cause her to faint. Rio barely has time to recover from this before Cartia arranges yet another Gate Battle against a man named King with Rina held captive.
8	"Ace" "Ēsu" (エース)	February 22, 2011
In order to save Rina, Rio has to guess which hand King will have a coin in after he flips it, not made easy by Rio's fatigue and King's history as a con artist. However, Rio sees through his strategy of destroying the coin, and picks one a hand that's guaranteed to be empty. However, Rina disappears again. Meanwhile, Jack hacks into the systems using a videogame-like controller to try to take control of the flight system. Despite being told to rest, Rio goes to search for Rina, and is shocked to discover she is a Gate Holder working under Cartia, who is revealed to be her aunt. Rina claims to be seeking revenge against Rio's mother, Risa Rollins, for allegedly seducing her father and convincing him to leave her weak mother, who fell into a coma out of shock, revealing they are blood-related. A Gate Battle takes place in a game of poker, where Rina's superior Roll Ruler abilities win against Rio, who falls unconscious.
9	"Joker" "Jōkā" (ジョーカー)	March 1, 2011
As a result of Rio's defeat, Cartia takes control of the Howard Resort and remakes it into the Goltschmidt Kingdom, leaving Howard with only the Sky Resort which is left floating in the sea. Upon returning from a movie shoot, Rosa is approached by the fortune teller Dana, who reveals that the Casino Guild is working with Cartia, who is trying to locate the last two Gate Holders for Rina to battle. Meanwhile, Orlin and Elvis, who have not enjoyed gambling as much following Cartia's takeover, come to challenge Rio in a game in which the loser must leave the casino forever. Rio wins the games, but then Misery takes over Rosa again, revealing Jack had used his powers to help Rio win and mentioning Cartia plans to tear down Misery Castle before she leaves. Howard later calls Rio over to help him sabotage the Goltschmidt Resort but they are caught. Rio rejects an offer from Cartia to be a general manager and leaves, warning Rina on her way out. When she loses track of Howard, she encounters a Joker and she, along with Dana, are transported inside someone else's Roll Ruler.
10	"Reverse" "Ribāsu" (リバース)	March 8, 2011
Rio and Dana follow her ferret, Chip, to a casino where the mysterious Joker is holding Howard captive. She challenges Rio to a game of blackjack in order for her to escape her Roll Ruler, which forces them into a draw at every play. As Rio realizes her compassionate ways made her ignorant of Rina's true feelings, she ends up losing a hand. However, after Mint and Jack arrive, Rio manages to win a hand, to which Joker presents with a Gate and frees her from her Roll Ruler, deeming her worthy of challenging Rina again. Meanwhile, Rina becomes curious of Cartia's motives for getting all the Gates. Later, Rio learns Dana is the final Gate Holder, who challenges her to cross a trap filled bridge in order to win her gate. Using her Roll Ruler, Rio figures out the positions of the traps and how to turn them against her, allowing her to win. As Howard converses with the true identity of Joker, Rio and her friends head to Goltschmidt Kingdom in order to confront Rina again.
11	"Number Ten" "Nanbā Ten" (ナンバーテン)	March 15, 2011
Rio and her friends enter Goltschmidt Kingdom and start winning big in the various attractions in order to be able to buy back the resort. However, Mint's bear Choco goes missing, so Rio goes with her back to the casino to search for it. Meanwhile, Howard talks to the true Joker, Risa Rollins, who reveals she hid herself from the Casino Guild to protect Rio. The next day, everyone had lost their winnings thanks to twins named Yang-Yang and An-An who challenge Rio and friends to an explosive game of Concentration. With the score tied, Rio shares her aura with Mint, who is able to find the final pair and win the match. Just then, a wayward explosion hits Mint, but she is rescued by An-An, who is revealed to be Choco, who Yang-Yang had taken to make into a friend to play with. Rina then appears and Rio challenges her to a Gate Battle.
12	"Speculation" "Supekyurēshon" (スペキュレーション)	March 24, 2011
After publicly announcing the terms of the Gate Battle, Howard takes Rio and the others on vacation to an island town to relax before the battle. While looking for Rio, Mint meets an old man, who explains Rio used to come to this place with Rina and Risa when she was young. Meanwhile, Rio visits her old vacation home where she almost discovers Rina before learning that Mint had gotten lost trying to find her. Mint is found by Rina, who uses her Roll Ruler to protect her from a bear. As Rina returns Mint to Howard, he tries to explain that Cartia is lying to her, though she says that even if it was a lie, it has made her stronger. On the night of the Gate Battle, which is to be a 15-game match of poker, Joker takes Elvis' place as the dealer. Rina wins the first two games using her Roll Ruler, but Rio hints she has a trick up her sleeve.
13	"Rainbow Gate" "Reinbō Gēto" (レインボーゲート)	March 29, 2011
Rina gains a huge advantage over Rio, managing to lead 14-0. However, Rio soon starts to make her comeback, and as the two put their Roll Rulers to the test, the Gates start to glow. With the game tied 14–14, Rio takes Rina and Joker into her Roll Ruler world, where secrets cannot be hidden. Joker reveals her identity as Risa, revealing that she and Rina's father had to leave to protect Rio and Rina from the Casino Guild, who wanted to use them for evil, while Rina is shown her suppressed memories, and her resolve for fighting is shown. Upon returning to the real world, Rio wins due to her Royal Straight Flush and is declared the new MVCD. The Gates then activate to form the Rainbow Gate which Rio enters. However, the casino is attacked by Casino Guild radicals who try to capture Rio, but are stopped by Carlos, who reveals himself to be a member of the ICDG Police, revealing the radicals' intentions to use the MVCD for evil and convincing them to retreat. Meanwhile, Rio's ultimate Roll Ruler spreads good fortune throughout the entire world, giving everyone good luck. As life returns to normal, some mysterious figures appear on the roof of Howard Resort.
Bonus	"Let's Happy & Day Dream" "Rettsu☆Happī ando Dei☆Dorīmu" (レッツ☆ハッピー&デイ☆ドリーム)	October 19, 2011
A brisk wind blows one of Yang-Yang's talismans which turns Choco into human form again. Choco decides she wants to earn money so she can buy Mint a camera for her birthday. Though she does not have any luck in the casino, she manages to get a reward for returning Howard's wallet to him. Meanwhile, Linda, Mint and Jack stumble across some strange robotic aliens that crash landed on the resort, who shoot a beam that sends Mint and Jack to a strange world based on Linda's dreams. Choco gets help from Ille to buy the camera, though her talisman gets blown off and she reverts to a teddy bear, but Ille manages to deliver the camera to Mint.

== See also ==
- Gambling in Japan
