= Isobel Cooper =

- Also known as: Izzy
- Born: Isobel Cooper; 24 January 1975 (age 51); Much Wenlock, Shropshire, England
- Genre: Operatic pop
- Occupations: Singer; Songwriter; Record Producer; Entrepreneur
- Instrument: Vocals
- Years active: 1999–present

Isobel Cooper (born 24 January 1975), known professionally as Izzy, is an English operatic pop soprano singer.

Born in Much Wenlock, Shropshire, England, she trained at Guildhall School of Music and Drama in London.

Her debut audio CD Libera Me was released in 1999. Other CD releases include Ascolta (2000), and New Dawn (2002).

A CD compilation titled Izzy (2003), that included a duet of "The Prayer," with American tenor Daniel Rodriguez, was released in the US, the CD also included a multimedia track of "My Love Is Like a Red Red Rose".

Two of her CDs reached the No. 1 position in the UK's Classic FM classical music chart. In 2000, she was nominated for a Classic Brit Award as "Female Artist of the Year".

The song "Wish" was performed by Cooper for the game Rygar: The Legendary Adventure in 2002. The soundtrack for the game includes the song but it was only released in Japan that same year.

In 2004, she was a featured artist on Now We Are Free, a dance remix on CD and vinyl of the Gladiator film theme song by Lisa Gerrard. The disc was a UK No 1 dance chart hit and also reached No 19 on the UK Singles Chart.

Her second dance track, "Eternity", by Matt Darey, was released as a 12" vinyl in November 2005.

== Discography ==
- Libera Me (1999)
- Ascolta (2000)
- New Dawn (2002)
- Izzy (US only, 2003)
- Izzy Sings Musicals (2007)
- Cancion (2010)
