= Tecmo Classic Arcade =

2005 video game

- North American cover art for Tecmo Classic Arcade
- Developer: Tecmo
- Publisher: Tecmo
- Platform: Xbox
- Release: NA: September 13, 2005; EU: October 21, 2005; JP: October 27, 2005
- Genre: Various
- Modes: Single-player, multiplayer

Tecmo Classic Arcade is a collection of classic Tecmo arcade games for the Xbox. This collection was released on September 13, 2005 in the U.S., October 21, 2005 in Europe and October 27, 2005 in Japan, and contains all of the games that Tecmo Hit Parade (a similar collection released on the PlayStation 2 exclusively in Japan) includes along with four more games. This game was published and developed by Tecmo.

== Games ==
There are 11 games in this collection. Games that are not in the original Tecmo Hit Parade are marked by an asterisk.

- Bomb Jack (1984)
- Pinball Action (1985)
- Pleiads (1981)
- Rygar* (1986)
- Senjyo (1983)
- Solomon's Key (1986)
- Star Force (1984)
- Strato Fighter* (1991)
- Swimmer* (1982)
- Tecmo Bowl* (1987)
- Tecmo Cup (1985)

== Reception ==
Tecmo Classic Arcade scored fairly low due to the lack of the more important Tecmo games. IGN scored the game a 4.8/10 saying that it does not have enough games, lacks fun, and costs more than other classic arcade collections. GameSpot scored the game a 6/10 saying that the emulation is accurate but many of the titles are not worth playing.
