= Phoenix (1980 video game) =

1980 video game

- North American arcade flyer
- Publishers: JP: Taito; NA: Centuri
- Platforms: Arcade, Atari 2600
- Release: Arcade; JP: December 1980; US: January 1981; Atari 2600; February 1983
- Genre: Fixed shooter
- Modes: Single-player, multiplayer

Phoenix (Note: Japanese: フェニックス, Hepburn: Fenikkusu) is a 1980 fixed shooter video game developed and published for arcades. Phoenix was released in Japan by Taito and in the United States by Centuri, where it helped the company turn a profit after a loss the previous year. Atari, Inc. contracted the rights to develop a home port for the Atari 2600 and sued Imagic for their game Demon Attack, which they felt was too similar to Phoenix. The 2600 version was released in 1983.

The player controls a space ship shooting at incoming enemies that fly from the top of the screen down towards the player's ship. There are five stages which repeat endlessly. The fifth is a fight against a large enemy spaceship, making Phoenix one of the first shooters with a boss battle, an element that would become common for the genre.

The Atari port of Phoenix received positive reviews from contemporary video game publications such as Electronic Games, Electronic Fun with Computers and Games, and The Video Game Update with some reviews in Blip, JoyStik and Video Games felt it was not as strong as the similar game Demon Attack on the Intellivision. Retrospective reviews of the arcade game from Eurogamer and AllGame praised the game as expanding on formulas established in earlier shooter games.

== Gameplay ==
Arcade gameplay of Phoenix featuring the boss mothership. Phoenix is one of the first shooter games to feature a boss battle.

Phoenix is a fixed-screen shooter, set in space. The player maneuvers left and right to avoid objects such as missiles and charging enemies. A force field can be used by the player to protect them from these attacks. The force field only lasts a few seconds and then cannot be used for approximately five seconds after.

The game consists of five stages. In each of the first two, the player must destroy a formation of small phoenixes, some of which will dive toward the player's ship in an attempt to destroy it. For the third and fourth stages, the player faces a group of eggs that veer back and forth across the screen before hatching into large phoenixes. Eggs can be destroyed with one shot, while the phoenixes must be hit in the body; if a wing is hit, it will regenerate after a few seconds. In the fifth stage, the player confronts a large fortress and must shoot through both its hull and a rotating shield band in order to destroy its pilot, all the while fending off attacks by small phoenixes. Once the fortress is destroyed, the cycle begins again with increased difficulty One life is lost every time the player's ship is hit by an enemy or missile without having the force field up; once all lives are lost, the game ends.

Switches are available on the arcade machine to the operator of the machine that can adjust gameplay. These switches allow the number of initial lives in the game to range between three and six, while other switches control what score is required to earn an extra life.

== Development ==
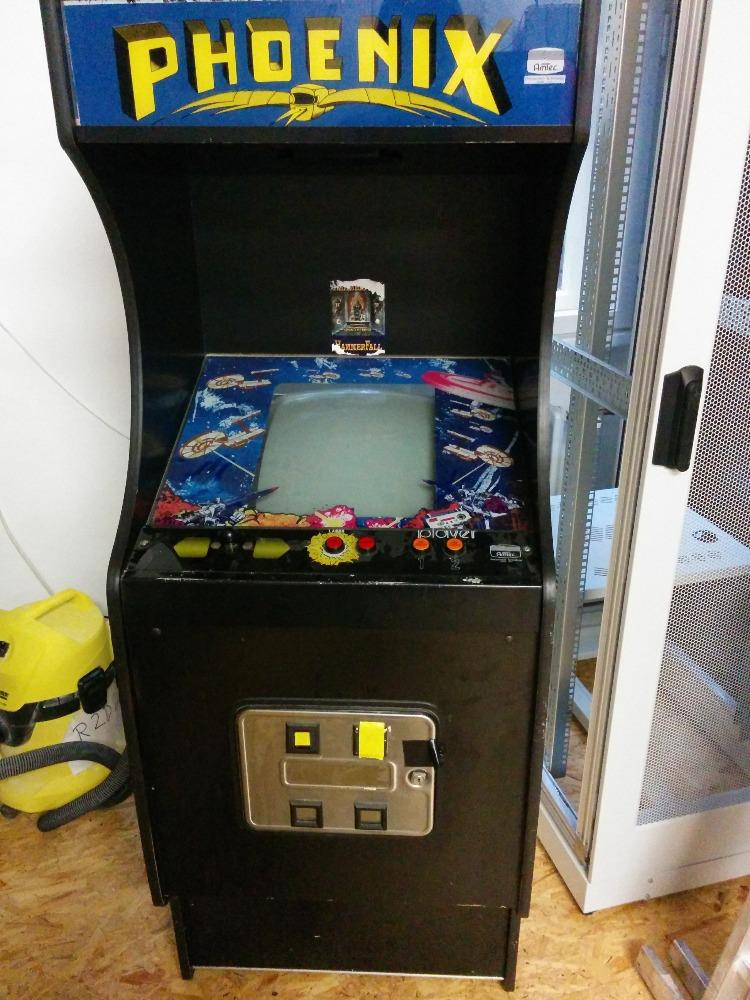
An Italian arcade cabinet of Phoenix. The game was distributed in Japan and Europe before its release to American arcades.

In the late 1970s and early 1980s, several game companies made outer-space themed shooter games, which involved players destroying alien space fleets. These games generally shared the traits of enemies slowing approaching towards the player from the top of the screen and attacking the player. Phoenix was one of the games following this trend.

Japanese video game developers were often denied credit for work by the companies they are subcontracted to out of fear they would go and work for rivals; Taito was notorious for denying credit to developers such as Toaplan and Visco Corporation. Taito is credited as the copyright holder for the Japanese version. Nova Apparate released the game in Germany. Tokyo-based G.G.I. Corporation, a developer who also developed Espial for arcades, is credited in this version. The North American rights were sold to Amstar Electronics, a company based in Phoenix, Arizona. Centuri entered into a licensing agreement with Amstar Electronics to release Phoenix in the United States, Canada, and Central and South America in 1981. Centuri president Miller had worked for Taito before working at Centuri. The game's developer remained a mystery due to the credits being overwritten by rights owners. Graeme Mason of Retro Gamer magazine theorized that the developer could be Tehkan, due to the game's visual similarities to Pleiades (1981).

In 1982, Atari received a four-year contract to port arcade games that Centuri had acquired to home video game consoles. The first three games announced were ports of the games Vanguard (1981), Challenger (1981) and Phoenix. The Atari port of the game was made by John Mraceck and Michael Feinstein who were working at General Computer Corporation.. Mraceck was a junior at MIT at the time and made the game as part of his internship. It was developed in mid-1982. Mraceck said that they had to cut over one-third of their original code to fit the game on the cart. The two developers were limited to 8 KB rom cartridge for the game. The Atari 2600 version is missing elements from the arcade original, such as the ability to save high scores, the music, the star field background, numerals representing points when a bird is hit, the smaller birds appearing around the mothership, and has fewer enemies appear on the screen. The music used in the arcade version includes "Romance de Amor", which is played when the game starts and "Für Elise" which is played when a player completes a level.

== Release ==
Phoenix was released in Japan in December 1980 where it was licensed to Taito. The arcade version of the game was distributed in the United States by Centuri in January 1981.

Phoenix was released for the Atari 2600 in February 1983. Atari had the exclusive rights to produce Phoenix for home consoles and filed suit against the company Imagic, believing that their game Demon Attack (1982) was too derivative of Phoenix. A settlement was reached in January 1983, with Imagic still being allowed to release Demon Attack for the Atari 2600. Phoenix was released for home computers and game systems in the compilation game Taito Legends (2005) for Xbox, PlayStation 2, PlayStation Portable, and Windows PCs.

== Reception and legacy ==
Contemporary Atari 2600 ratings

Review scores
Publication	Score
Electronic Fun with Computers and Games	4/4
JoyStik	2/5

The arcade game was popular in Europe and Japan. At the end of 1981, Centuri reported revenues of USD$61.4 million with a profit of 7.5 million. In comparison, the company's previous year gross was $5.9 million with a loss of $4.5 million. Phoenix was the best selling of Centuri's titles by 1982. The Atari 2600 version sold over 600,000 units.

The Video Game Update referred to the Atari 2600 adaptation as a good translation of the arcade classic. In Electronic Games, Bill Kunkel and Arnie Katz wrote that the game was favorably compared to other Atari 2600 releases such as Vanguard, Yars' Revenge (1982), and Demons to Diamonds (1982), noting the quality in graphics and control, and stating it "is perhaps the finest invasion title ever produced for the 2600!" Noel Steere of Electronic Fun with Computers and Games praised the game, stating it was a "perfect arcade adaptation" with beautiful sound, which made up "for the sin of Pac-Man". The game received a Certificate of Merit in the category of "1984 Best Science Fiction / Fantasy Videogame" at the 5th annual Arkie Awards. Some critics compared the game to Imagic's Demon Attack. Jim Gorzelany of JoyStik found that the gameplay and challenge was too watered down compared to the original arcade game and Imagic's game. Phil Wiswell of Video Games found that Atari's versions of both Phoenix showcased that Atari could still make both fun and graphically appealing games, while finding the game still suffered in comparison to the Intellivision release of Demon Attack. An anonymous reviewer in Blip magazine concurred that the Intellivision version of Demon Attack was superior, but found that final battle with the mothership in Phoenix allowed Atari's game to stand on its own.

Retrospective ratings

Review scores
Publication	Score	
Publication	Arcade	Atari 2600
AllGame	5/5	4.5/5
Eurogamer	9/10	
The Video Games Guide	4/5	

In a retrospective review from AllGame, critic Brett Alan Weiss described the arcade version as a "one of the most impressive games the "slide-and-shoot" genre has to offer, bested only by Galaga (1981) in terms of sheer enjoyment and replayability" and said that "finely balanced" shooting action combined with "colorfully" animated graphics made Phoenix a classic in shooter genre. In his book The Video Game Guide (2013), Matt Fox compared the arcade game to Galaxian (1979), stating that Phoenix took its gameplay "a few screens further". Chris Wilkins of Eurogamer complimented the arcade game for expanding the gameplay of the shooter genre, specifically with the boss character and that the game was addictive as it "never fails to invoke the "one more go" desire in the player." In 1995, Flux magazine ranked the arcade version of Phoenix at #69 on their list of "Top 100 Video Games", saying that it was one of the better Space Invaders variations. Discussing the game in Retro Gamer, Nick Thorpe compared the game to Space Invaders, finding Phoenix "considerably advanced" due to its difficulty to predict behaviors of enemies and final boss fight while also noting that it lacked some elements from modern shooters, such as power-ups and a larger enemy variety.

Weiss included the Atari 2600 port of Phoenix in his book The 100 Greatest Console Video Games 1977-1987 (2014). He wrote that the Atari port had rich graphics, crisp sound and excellent gameplay, preserving the feel of original arcade game. Retro Gamer included the Atari 2600 port of the game in their list of the top 25 games for the system in 2008.

Phoenix was one of the first shooter games to have a boss battle. Mason said that "Despite numerous ground-breaking innovations, Phoenix is rarely mentioned in the same breath as its legendary arcade peers." Bosses would come to typify the shooter genre following the release of the game. Games that borrowed elements from Phoenix include Space Vultures, Gorf (1981), Pleiades (1981), and Condor Attack (1983). Bootleg versions of Phoenix were released in arcades as Condor, Griffon, Vautour, and Batman Part 2.

== See also ==
- Golden age of arcade video games
