= Strato Fighter =

1991 video game

- Arcade flyer
- Developer: Tecmo
- Publisher: Tecmo
- Platform: Arcade
- Release: JP/NA: February 1991
- Genre: Scrolling shooter
- Modes: Single-player, multiplayer

Strato Fighter (Note: Japanese: 雷牙, Hepburn: Raiga) is a 1991 horizontally scrolling shooter video game developed and published by Tecmo for arcades. It was released in Japan and North America in February 1991. In 2005, Strato Fighter was released on the Xbox as part of the Tecmo Classic Arcade collection. Hamster Corporation released the game as part of their Arcade Archives series for the Nintendo Switch and PlayStation 4 in July 2023.

== Gameplay ==
The player controls the spaceship Raiga, which has the ability to rotate to attack enemies from behind. Power-ups can be obtained by destroying container ships, which grants both new weapons (such as shotgun bullets and bomb attacks) and upgrades to the spaceship's offenses and durability. The spacecraft can also obtain an Option weapon called the Auto Guard; three types of Auto Guards were available such as the target locking Beam Rifle, the powerful Solid Shooter and the standard Blaster item.

== Reception ==
In Japan, Game Machine listed Strato Fighter as the third most successful table arcade unit of February 1991.
