= Rygar: The Legendary Adventure =

2002 video game

- North American cover art
- Developer: Tecmo (Note: Ported to Wii by Team Tachyon)
- Publishers: Tecmo: PAL: Wanadoo Edition; EU: Rising Star Games (Wii)
- Directors: Takao Ando; Manabu Nagasaki (Wii)
- Producers: Satoshi Kanematsu; Keisuke Kikuchi (Wii); Kenichi Asami (Wii)
- Programmers: Yutaka Koga; Taihei Obara (Wii)
- Artists: Hirohisa Kaneko; Masafumi Kubo; Kousuke Wakamatsu
- Composers: Hiroaki Takahashi; Riichiro Kuwabara (Wii)
- Platforms: PlayStation 2; Wii
- Release: PlayStation 2: NA: November 24, 2002; JP: December 5, 2002; AU: May 1, 2003; EU: May 30, 2003; Wii: JP: December 11, 2008; NA: February 3, 2009; AU: April 7, 2009; EU: July 3, 2009
- Genre: Action-adventure
- Mode: Single player

Rygar: The Legendary Adventure (Note: Japanese: アルゴスの戦士, Hepburn: Arugosu no Senshi; (lit. Warrior of Argus)) is a 2002 action-adventure video game developed and published by Tecmo for the PlayStation 2. It is loosely based on Tecmo's 1986 arcade game Rygar and its 1987 NES port. It was released in North America in November 2002, in Japan in December 2002 and in Australasia and Europe in May 2003, published by Wanadoo Edition. In 2009, it was remastered for the Wii by Team Tachyon as Rygar: The Battle of Argus, (Note: Japanese: アルゴスの戦士 マッスルインパクト, Hepburn: Arugosu no Senshi Massuru Inpakuto; (Warrior of Argus: Muscle Impact)) it was published by Tecmo in Japan in December 2008 and in North America in February 2009. It was released in Australasia and Europe in April and July 2009, respectively, published by Rising Star Games.

Set several years after the Roman Empire's conquest of Egypt, the game tells the story of Rygar, a heavy infantryman in the navy of Argus, a fictional Roman-controlled Mediterranean island. When Princess Harmonia of Argus is kidnapped by a group of Titans, Rygar is tasked by an ethereal voice to save her. To accomplish this, he is given the Diskarmor, a legendary weapon forged by the gods themselves. Believing his mission to be that of a simple rescue, Rygar discovers that there is much more to the Titans' objectives than he initially imagined, and the fate of the world hangs in the balance.

Upon its initial PlayStation 2 release, The Legendary Adventure was well-received, with critics praising the Diskarmor mechanics, the depth of the combat and upgrade systems, the graphics, and the score. Several critics opined that it was the best action-adventure game released on the PlayStation 2. Common points of criticism included the game's short length, a weak storyline, poor voice acting, and, especially, the use of a fixed camera system. The Battle of Argus on Wii met with primarily negative reviews. Whilst most critics lauded the same aspects of the game as they had with the original (score, combat mechanics, upgrades etc.), they were heavily critical of how little effort had been put into updating the title, arguing that it felt dated, and had nothing to attract modern gamers.

== Gameplay ==
Rygar: The Legendary Adventure is an action-adventure game in which the player character's main offensive weapon is his Diskarmor, a razor-sharp spinning shield that can be thrown some distance whilst staying attached to him, similar to a yo-yo. The game is played from a fixed-camera third-person perspective, with the camera's position automatically changing relative to the player's current position.

Screenshot of The Legendary Adventure. Here, Rygar is battling a minotaur, one of the game's bosses. The bar on the top left is Rygar's health, the bar below it is his Icol.

The Diskarmor has two basic attack types; light and heavy, and by combining the two attacks in various configurations, the player can initiate combos, which become more complex but also more powerful as the game progresses. The Diskarmor is also capable of blocking, although players cannot move when blocking. Abilities can be unlocked that add other functions to the Diskarmor, such as a grapple ability that allows the player to swing between specially marked icons, or a pulley ability that allows them to pull themselves up to otherwise unreachable areas.

There are three different Diskarmors in the game (Hades (the default weapon), Heaven, and Sea). The Hades Diskarmor is best for fighting a single opponent and has medium range; the Heaven Diskarmor is designed to fight multiple opponents and has a long reach and moves in a wide circle. The Sea Diskarmor is very short-ranged and not very strong, but is extremely fast. Each Diskarmor is capable of summoning a Familiar; Hades can summon Cerberus, Heaven can summon Talos, and Sea can summon a Siren.

Throughout the game, the player can find numerous pick-ups. These include health replenishments, health bar increases, Icol (magic needed to summon Familiars) replenishments, Icol bar increases, offensive power increases, mystic stones for use with the Diskarmors, Sfaira (power-up points for the Diskarmors), story-related documents, and bonus unlockables such as music, cutscenes, and concept art. Mystic stones can be attached to Diskarmors and have multiple possible effects, such as increasing attack power, increasing defence power, making available new combos, granting more speed, allowing for critical hits etc.

Once the player has accumulated enough Sfaira, the Diskarmors can be leveled-up. Each Diskarmor can be leveled-up twice, and each level-up increases the Diskarmor's strength and defence, increases the strength of the Familiar, reduces the amount of Icol necessary for summoning a Familiar, and opens up one additional slot for a mystic stone attachment.

== Plot ==
Set several years after the Roman Empire's conquest of Egypt, Rygar: The Legendary Adventure takes place on Argus, a Roman-controlled Mediterranean island. A heavy infantryman in the Argus navy, Rygar has established himself as one of the greatest swordsmen alive, but with no family or memories of his childhood, he doesn't even know his real name.

As Rygar is attending a ceremony in the Colosseo with Princess Harmonia, they are attacked by Titans, evil beings created alongside the gods, but who were banished to the dungeon of Tartarus aeons prior. Harmonia is captured, and Rygar falls into a pit. He is soon revived by a female voice and given the Diskarmor, a shield forged by the gods. He is then told he must stop the Titans. He soon encounters Icarus, the Titans' leader, who speculates that Rygar cannot be "the lion of the man that Cronus talked about." Cronus was a Titan who led a revolt against the gods from Tartarus, creating the Gate of Darkness to allow the Titans to return to Earth. Icarus tries to kill Rygar, but Rygar summons the spirit of Cerberus from his Diskarmor, turning it into the Hades Diskarmor, and prompting Icarus to flee.

Rygar soon finds another Diskarmor, the Heaven Diskarmor, capable of summoning Talos. He then learns of the War of Cronus; after Cronus escaped Tartarus, the gods of heaven, the oceans, and the underworld forged three Diskarmors, giving them to three human warriors. Using the spirits within each Diskarmor, the three warriors defeated Cronus, banishing him back to Tartarus and sealing the Gate of Darkness with the power of the Diskarmors. One of them, the Warrior of the Sea, was Argo, founder of Argus, and when Rygar locates the Sea Diskarmor, capable of summoning a Siren, the voice who revived him reveals herself to be Argo.

As Rygar heads to the Gate of Darkness, he is confronted by Echidna, Icarus's right-hand woman. She reveals her real name is Cleopatra, and after Rome invaded Egypt, her son Caesarion was killed, and so she ate the flesh of a Titan, becoming a Demon and vowing revenge against humanity. However, when Rygar tells her that he has no childhood memories and is unaware of his true name, she leaves and returns to Icarus, having realised that Rygar is Caesarion. Icarus says he knew all along, stabbing her, and explaining that he needed to manipulate her into fighting Rygar so as to fulfil Cronus's prophecy.

Eventually, Rygar reaches the Gate of Darkness, and confronts Icarus, who explains that the prophecy says when the three Diskarmors open the Gate, Cronus will be resurrected in the body of a "young lion who has killed his mother." The spirit of Cronus then traps Rygar in a beam of light. However, the wounded Echidna is able to release him and toss him the Diskarmor before she is sucked into the Gate.

Icarus flees with Harmonia and as Rygar pursues them, Argo explains that Icarus was once named Aristotle, and was one of the three warriors that fought Cronus, alongside herself and Alexander. After the conflict, the Diskarmors were considered too powerful for mankind and were hidden on Argus. Years later, however, Alexander attacked Argus in an attempt to acquire the Diskarmors. Aristotle defended Argus, but was betrayed by the people and banished into the Gate of Darkness. In Tartarus, he allowed himself to be seduced by Cronus, becoming Icarus and vowing revenge against Argus.

Rygar confronts Icarus, but as they prepare to fight, Argo inhabits Harmonia's body, reminding Icarus that he once loved her. Overcome, Icarus rejects Cronus, creating a protective seal around Harmonia. He is then transformed into Typhon by Cronus. He and Rygar fight, with Rygar proving victorious. Rygar then enters the Gate of Darkness and is confronted by Echidna, who is in the midst of being transformed into a monster by Cronus. Against her will, she attacks him, but he is able to defeat her. He then faces Cronus himself, who he also defeats. As he flees Tartarus, he finds the barely alive Echidna. They reconcile and she dies in his arms. He continues to flee but is caught in an explosion and is falling into the bottomless depths when he is saved by Icarus, who carries him to the Gate, allowing him to return to Argus. There, he sees Harmonia and the two embrace.

== Development ==
Rumors of a Rygar remake began to spread in January 2002, when Tecmo confirmed that they were developing both a new Ninja Gaiden game and an untitled action-adventure game. The game was confirmed in April, with Tecmo revealing it would be a PlayStation 2 exclusive. They also revealed it would incorporate elements of Greek mythology, and cited films such as Clash of the Titans (1981) and Gladiator (2000) as influences. Rygar was first shown at E3 in May 2002, when an FMV and a non-playable demo was shown. At this stage of development, Rygar could use his fists for combat as well as the Diskarmor. This ability was removed from the game's final build. A short playable demo was made available to game journalists in September.

The visual template underpinning the game's design are those of Ancient Greece and the Roman Empire. In a Q&A with GameSpot in September, producer Satoshi Kanematsu said,

the source of inspiration for this game has multiple origins. I personally enjoyed studying the history of Western civilization and so on. I've gone on many soul-searching trips to the countries in Europe with my favorite guitar. Personal experiences like playing my guitar in front of places like the Parthenon in Athens during sunset and midnight jam sessions in Rome have stimulated my creativity. I also have quite an impressive group of guys working with me. In my development team, there are guys who worked on excavation projects in Rome and Pompeii. The father of one of my key members is a world-renowned archaeologist, and he gives us great advice. I also have to give credit to some of the movies like Clash of the Titans, Ben Hur, The Ten Commandments, Jason and the Argonauts, and so on.

Early in production, several Tecmo staff members went to Greece to collect reference material. This included CG designer Tadafumi Kubo, who photographed materials for texture use. Kubo used Autodesk 3ds Max to design the levels and build the character models, as he found this method faster than drawing by hand. The character models were then imported into Softimage to animate them.

The CG cutscene which plays when the game first boots up began production before the game itself. This sequence was produced by Masaru Mayama of Polygon Magic, while Visual Science Laboratory (VSL) handled the day-to-day production. The movie had to be completely ready for E3 in May 2003, with game producer Satoshi Kanematsu asking for "a movie that will make people at E3 stand and watch with their mouths agape." Production began with VSL appointing a director to oversee the creation of a storyboard, based on the visual data supplied by Kubo. The creation of this storyboard took about a month, with the production time for developing the actual 3D taking another two. Softimage and 3ds Max were used for the effects. Maya was used for particle processing. Everything was rendered and combined in Adobe After Effects. The cutscene towards the end of the game where Princess Harmonia begins singing was created in much the same way, using all the same tools.

=== Music ===
The game's soundtrack album, Symphonic Poem Rygar: The Legendary Adventure Original Soundtrack, (Note: 交響詩「アルゴスの戦士」～オリジナル・サウンドトラック, Kōkyōshi Arugosu no Senshi Orijinaru Saundotorakku) was released in Japan by Virgin on December 4, 2002. The music from the game was composed by Takayasu Sodeoka, Riichiro Kuwabara, and Hiroaki Takahashi, with the soundtrack featuring 27 tracks, including the main theme, "Wish", performed by opera singer Isobel Cooper (credited as Izzy) and recorded at Abbey Road Studios.

== The Battle of Argus ==
Much of the gameplay in The Battle of Argus is identical to The Legendary Adventure. Aside from the visual design of the protagonist, the biggest differences are some new enemies and the addition of Gladiator Mode; a 30-level gauntlet mode that must be played with the Wii Remote. The standard story mode (called "Conquest Mode") gives players the option of finishing a combo with a swing of the controller. Speaking to Gamasutra in December 2007, producer Keisuke Kikuchi addressed the reason that Conquest Mode and Gladiator Mode had different control schemes;

Screenshot of The Battle of Argus, showing how similar the game looks to The Legendary Adventure, with an identical HUD. Note Rygar's new black-and-white look and one of the game's new enemies.

what we're trying to do [in Conquest Mode] is give the control more variation; so it's a combination of swinging, directional [sic] and then also the button A and button B, so that we've got more variations. So hopefully you don't get tired of it. Now, Gladiator Mode, it measures the speed of the controller and reflects that as increased power for the attacks. So that's a little different; something that you'll wanna keep on trying, because faster speed will give you a more powerful blow.

In a hands-on preview a few months before the game came out, IGN's Daemon Hatfield called it "essentially the same game that arrived on the PlayStation 2 back in 2002 with some light motion controls added and general gameplay tweaks."

=== Development ===
Battle of Argus was first referenced in May 2007, when Famitsu listed an upcoming untitled Wii game from Tecmo, listed as "Shin Kankaku Action Game" ("new-style action game"). Several days later, at the Tecmo Nite Out event in Tokyo, Tecmo revealed the game's working title was Project Rygar, showing some concept art depicting the game's "new hero" - a muscular young man with tattoos, white spiky hair, white and black clothes, and a goatee. Also shown in the art were the Diskarmor and several heavily armored enemies. The blurb for the game was "New Hero, New Enemies, Swing Action". In July, Tecmo revealed that the game was a port of The Legendary Adventure rather than a new game. However, they stressed that there would be a new protagonist, new enemies, and a new gauntlet mode played using the Wiimote.

In September, a gameplay trailer was made available at the Tokyo Game Show and the game's Japanese subtitle was revealed as Muscle Impact. A release date of December 2007 was given. In an interview with 1Up, Kikuchi addressed the issue of the negative reaction amongst fans when they learned the game was a port rather than a new Rygar title; "once you play this game and feel how it plays, I'm confident people will 'get it.'" He also acknowledged that there was a chance of the game not making its December 2007 release date;

the PS2 version of Rygar had a lot of complicated features, customization, different things that made it very difficult to bring it [sic] to the Wii, so that's pushing our schedule back. It's taking a little longer than anticipated. Plus, we're recreating the Wii control scheme for the Diskarmor control, but the more time we put into it the better it gets, so we're just trying to find a happy medium in optimizing the controls.

When asked why the team was putting so much effort into a five-year-old property rather than developing something new, Kikuchi explained that,

everything is built around the Diskarmor control using the Wii controller. Of course, I could have started everything from scratch on a new Rygar project, but if I was to do that it might not have been on Wii, we could have done it for PS3, 360, PS2. However, why we focused on Wii was because of what we could do with the Wii controller. Because of that, even though the game may be based on a five-year-old game, as you call it, it will still feel very fresh and very unique on the Wii system.

In an interview with Joystiq in October, he elaborated upon this when speaking of the origins of the project, again stressing the importance of the Wii itself;

when we worked on Super Swing Golf, we did a lot of research on the controls, a lot more than what we needed for golf games. I looked even deeper into the controls and the characteristics of the Wii Remote and the Nunchuck. When I looked at all the characteristics and controls of the Wii, I saw that Rygar would be a good fit. I saw that there were a lot of titles being used where the Wii controller was being used as a weapon or a sword. I would like to think that this Diskarmor, one of the biggest selling points of Rygar, would be a really good fit with the Remote, being able to swing and attack and defend with the Diskarmor.

Speaking to Cubed3 in November, he once again reiterated this point;

last year I developed Pangya! Golf with Style for Wii and what I felt during its development was that it is quite fun but difficult to design a game for the Wii Remote. When I was thinking what sort of game would be the best for the Wii remote, I came up with Diskarmor from Rygar. It is not a sword, nor a gun. You use it like a Yo-yo to defeat enemies and conquer various stages. I thought that would enhance the action performance of Rygar progressively, so I decided to develop it.

The game did not meet its December 2007 release date, and nothing more was heard of it until September 2008, when Tecmo included it in a list of upcoming games, with release slated for December 2008. The following day, James Mielke of 1Up wrote a blog post about the impending merger between Tecmo and Koei in which he discussed the cause of the year-long delay for Rygar. Mielke asserts that the game was originally conceived as "a $500,000 quickie port to the Wii." However, the product delivered in December 2007 was so bad that Tecmo decided not to release it and instead restart the project from scratch, "at nearly three times the cost of what they were trying to achieve in the first place." Ultimately, the game was released in Japan in December as planned, but the North American release was pushed back to February 2009.

== Reception ==
Reception

Aggregate score
Aggregator	Score	
Aggregator	PS2	Wii
Metacritic	83/100	52/100

Review scores
Publication	Score	
Publication	PS2	Wii
Electronic Gaming Monthly	8.8/10	
Eurogamer	8/10	4/10
Game Informer	9/10	5.5/10
GameSpot	7.3/10	6.5/10
IGN	8.4/10	6.1/10
Nintendo Power		7/10
Official U.S. PlayStation Magazine	4.5/5	
Play	5/5	

The initial PlayStation 2 release received "generally favorable reviews", and holds a score of 83 out of 100 on Metacritic, based on 30 reviews. On the other hand, the Wii port received "mixed or average" reviews, with a score of 52 out of 100 based on 29 reviews.

Play's Dave Halverson scored Legendary Adventure 5 out of 5, praising the graphics as "defying the hardware". Calling it "my action game of the year by a ridiculous margin," he concluded, Rygar is, simply put, the action event of the PS2's young life. It's as polished and well produced as 3D games get." Sam Kennedy of the Official U.S. PlayStation Magazine scored it 4.5 out of 5, praising the use of the Diskarmor and the depth of the combo system. He was extremely impressed with the graphics, calling them "stunningly beautiful" and lauded the "superlative attention to detail." He also praised the "divine" score. His main criticisms were the fixed camera and the lack of enemy variety. He concluded, "Rygar remains an incredible experience, and one of the finest action games I've ever played."

Game Informer's Matthew Kato scored it 9 out of 10, praising the destructible environments and the Diskarmor mechanics, although he was critical of the collision detection and fixed camera. Electronic Gaming Monthly scored it 8.8 out of 10. James Mielke praised the graphics, score, physics and controls, writing, "few games can compete with Rygar's awesome visuals, creative levels, flashy effects, and smooth movement." Miguel López praised the combat and the destructible environments, writing, "Rygar plays better than most action games." Sam Kennedy wrote, "the game is light years ahead of most." All three were critical of the fixed camera.

IGN's Douglass C. Perry scored it 8.4 out of 10, calling it "a solid, likeable action game." He praised the combat, controls, combo system, upgrades, level design, and bosses, and called the graphics, "righteously pretty." He also praised the score. On the other hand, he found the voice acting "stale" and was critical of enemy variety and the game's short length. He concluded, "Bolstered with great graphics and a superb soundtrack, Rygar makes up for its weaknesses by displaying an array of gameplay elements woven craftily together." Eurogamer's Martin Taylor scored it 8 out of 10, praising the combat, combo system, destructible environments, and graphics, but criticising the lack of enemy variety and the fixed camera. He concluded, "had it not been for the frequently infuriating camera, and [short length], Rygar could have been significantly more impressive than it already is."

GameSpot's Giancarlo Varanini scored it 7.3 out of 10. He was critical of the "thoroughly mediocre storyline and relatively short length." However, he praised the combat mechanics and the depth of customisation and combos. Although he was critical of the fixed camera, he was impressed with the graphics and animations, writing "Rygar's most stringent issue is its length - the game is only about four and a half to five hours long [...] In any case, for those five hours, Rygar is still a fun game with beautiful visuals and an excellent soundtrack."

In a 2006 retrospective for Hardcore Gaming 101, Michael Plasket called The Legendary Adventure, "a breathtaking masterpiece that gives Devil May Cry a run for its money as one of the best modern action-adventure titles of the early PlayStation 2 era."

=== The Battle of Argus ===
Nintendo Power's Kaiser Hwang scored The Battle of Argus 7 out of 10. He was critical of Rygar's "horrid" new look, the "incredibly frustrating camera angles", the dialog, and the voice acting. On the other hand, he felt the combat system worked well, and concluded, "much of what made the PS2 game great - particularly the epic boss battles and stunning musical score - is carried over here." GameSpot's Tom McShea scored it 6.5 out of 10. Of Gladiator mode, he wrote "[it] becomes tedious before long." He was also critical of the graphics, arguing that they looked no different from the original; "this game looks musty and old [...] Rygar: The Battle of Argus is a six-year-old game, and time has made many of its components feel outdated." Nevertheless, he concluded, "there is still a fun experience here."

IGN's Daemon Hatfield scored it 6.1 out of 10, arguing, "what may have been impressive in 2002 feels pretty dated today." He was heavily critical of the game's failure to support widescreen, instead stretching its 4:3 image to fit the 16:9 display ("pretty unforgivable today"). He also found the combat slow and predictable, writing "it may have been pretty cool at the time, but by today's standards Rygar is dull, with horrendous dialogue and a mixed bag of visuals." Game Informer's Ben Reeves scored it 5.5 out of 10, criticising the "sluggish" combat, and writing, "there is no reason to choose this game over the now cheaper PS2 version."

Eurogamer's Ellie Gibson scored it 4 out of 10. She was highly critical of the graphics; "the visuals in Rygar for Wii are actually worse than those in the PS2 game. The environments are much blurrier and less detailed." Her main criticism was how dated the game felt; "it has a silly plot, stupid dialogue, repetitive enemies, simplistic puzzles, dull boss levels and a camera that's just as infuriating as it was six years ago."

=== Nominations ===
The Legendary Adventure was a runner-up for GameSpot's annual "Best Music on PlayStation 2" and "Best Graphics (Artistic) on PlayStation 2" awards, which went to Grand Theft Auto: Vice City and Rez, respectively. Rygar also received a nomination for "Outstanding Achievement in Original Music Composition" during the Academy of Interactive Arts & Sciences' 6th Annual Interactive Achievement Awards. The award went to Medal of Honor: Frontline.
