= Gallop Racer 2001 =

2001 video game by Tecmo

Gallop Racer 2001 Gallop Racer 5
- Developer: Tecmo
- Publisher: Tecmo
- Series: Gallop Racer
- Platform: PlayStation 2
- Release: JP: March 29, 2001; NA: August 23, 2001
- Genre: Alternative sports (horse racing)
- Modes: Single-player, multiplayer

Gallop Racer 2001, known in Japan as Gallop Racer 5 (ギャロップレーサー5, Gyaroppu Rēsā 5), is a horse racing video game developed and published by Tecmo, released in 2001 for the PlayStation 2.

== Gameplay ==
In Gallop Racer 2001, there are several game modes: Practice (represents a single race), Season (starts by buying a horse for a year long racing) and Vs. (split-screen races for two players). During the race, the action can be seen from either watch or jockey mode with various number of camera angles.

== Reception ==
Reception

Aggregate score
Aggregator	Score
Metacritic	71/100

Review scores
Publication	Score
AllGame	3/5
Electronic Gaming Monthly	7.5/10
EP Daily	6/10
Famitsu	26/40
Game Informer	7.5/10
GameRevolution	C+
GameSpot	5.1/10
GameSpy	88%
IGN	7.9/10
Next Generation	3/5
PlayStation: The Official Magazine	5/10

The game received "average" reviews according to the review aggregation website Metacritic. Gary Whitta of NextGen gave the game generally positive review, commending its graphics and the game mechanics. In Japan, Famitsu gave it a score of 26 out of 40.
