= Tecmo Stackers =

1995 video game

- North American PlayStation box art
- Developer: Tecmo
- Publisher: Tecmo
- Platforms: Arcade, PlayStation, Sega Saturn
- Release: Arcade: JP/AS: 1995; PlayStation: JP: December 29, 1995; NA: September 1, 1997; Saturn: JP: January 26, 1996
- Genre: Puzzle
- Modes: Single player, multiplayer

Tecmo Stackers, known as Dero~n Dero Dero (Note: Japanese: でろ～んでろでろ, Hepburn: Dero~n Dero Dero) in Japan, is a 1995 puzzle video game developed and published by Tecmo for arcades. It was ported to the PlayStation and Sega Saturn, the former of which was released outside Japan in 1997. The gameplay is similar to Puyo Puyo.

Hamster Corporation released the arcade version outside Japan for the first time as part of their Arcade Archives series for the Nintendo Switch and PlayStation 4 in August 2024.

== Gameplay ==
Players try to connect sets of four blocks so that their colors match, causing the blocks to be removed. Remaining blocks may then fall and complete other sets of four blocks. The main difference between Tecmo Stackers and Puyo Puyo is that blocks in Tecmo Stackers stretch in various directions after adjacent blocks are removed, and the "arms" they send out can complete sets of blocks and be removed; this allows for longer chain reactions.

In arcade mode, players try to keep their stack of blocks from reaching the top of the screen. Long chain reactions send blocks to the opponent's screen. Arcade mode is available for one or two players, with players able to choose their difficulty independently of one another.

Chain reaction mode centers on getting as many chain reactions as possible.

In time trial mode, players try to keep their screen from filling with blocks for as long as possible.

== Reception ==
Reception

Aggregate score
Aggregator	Score
GameRankings	75.60% (2 reviews)

Review scores
Publication	Score
Electronic Gaming Monthly	6.125/10
IGN	7/10

Tecmo Stackers received mostly mixed reviews. GamePro called it "a highly addictive, Tetris-style puzzle game that's easy enough for anyone to play, yet complex enough to transfix even the best gamers for hours at a time." However, they criticized that the single-player mode is dull and easy, the visual of the blocks stretching out to grab other blocks is "disturbing", and the music is annoying enough to "[make] you want to rip the speakers out of your TV." They gave it a 4.5 out of 5 for both control and fun factor, but a 3.0 for graphics and a 2.0 for sound. Dan Hsu of Electronic Gaming Monthly likewise found the block stretching disturbing, and co-reviewer echoed GamePro's strong criticism of the music. Both Hsu and John Ricciardi described it as a second-rate Puyo Puyo clone, and Sushi-X, while likening it instead to Columns but with more technique, agreed that chain reactions are mindlessly easy to accomplish. Contradicting both EGM and GamePro, the reviewer for IGN said that the music is great. They also highly praised the gameplay in both single-player and multiplayer, but also remarked that the game didn't differentiate itself enough from other Tetris-like games, though it would be enough to satisfy fans of the genre.
