= Rygar =

1986 video game

- North American arcade flyer
- Developer: Tecmo (Note: The Commodore 64, ZX Spectrum, and Amstrad CPC versions were ported by Probe Software. The Master System version was ported by Salio, Inc. The Atari Lynx version was ported by Haehn Software. The X68000 version was ported by Dempa Micomsoft.)
- Publishers: Tecmo: PlayChoice-10; NA: Nintendo; Personal computers; EU: U.S. Gold Master System; JP: Salio Lynx; NA: Atari Corporation X68000; JP: Dempa Micomsoft
- Designer: Hideo Yoshizawa
- Platforms: Arcade; Nintendo Entertainment System; Commodore 64; ZX Spectrum; Amstrad CPC; Master System; Atari Lynx; X68000
- Release: May 1986: Arcade; JP: May 1986; NA: June 20, 1986; EU: August 1, 1986 NES; JP: April 17, 1987; NA: July 1987; EU: March 30, 1990; C64, CPC, ZX Spectrum; EU: October 12, 1987 Master System; JP: March 25, 1988 Lynx; NA: August 15, 1990 X68000; JP: April 28, 1994
- Genre: Platform
- Modes: Single-player, multiplayer
- Arcade system: PlayChoice-10

Rygar (Note: Japanese: アルゴスの戦士, Hepburn: Arugosu no Senshi; (lit. Warrior of Argus)) is a 1986 platform game developed and published by Tecmo for arcades. The player assumes the role of a "Legendary Warrior" who must navigate numerous levels and defeat enemies with a weapon called the "Diskarmor", a razor-sharp shield with a long chain attached to it that operates like a yo-yo. The warrior intends to defeat Ligar, an evil "dominator". Later ports, particularly the NES and Lynx versions, expanded on the near non-existent story from the original.

The game was subsequently ported to the NES (1987), Commodore 64 (1987), ZX Spectrum (1987), Amstrad CPC (1987), Master System (1988), Atari Lynx (1990), and X68000 (1994); Nintendo released the NES version in arcades in 1987. Emulated re-releases of different versions have also been released for Xbox (2005), Sprint mobile phones (2005), Wii (2009), PlayStation 4 (2014), Nintendo Switch (2018) and Android (2023). A remake, Rygar: The Legendary Adventure, was released for PlayStation 2 in 2002. The Legendary Adventure was remastered for the Wii in 2008 as Rygar: The Battle of Argus.

Rygar received mixed reviews across its various platforms. The most lauded version of the game was the NES version, which was praised for incorporating RPG elements into an otherwise standard platformer, and which has since been recognised as an important early example of the Metroidvania sub-genre. On the other hand, the Commodore, Spectrum, and Amstrad ports were poorly received, particularly their graphics. A common criticism across all platforms was the game's high difficulty. Financially, the games have been successful; the original arcade version proved profitable worldwide, and as of June 2007, the various ports, emulations, and remakes of Rygar have sold 1.5 million units across all platforms.

== Gameplay ==
Rygar is a side-scrolling platformer in which the basic gameplay sees the player character move left to right, with the player able to jump, duck, attack, and climb ropes. Rygar's only weapon is his Diskarmor, a razor-sharp spinning shield that can be thrown some distance whilst staying attached to him, similar to a yo-yo. Available attacks are a standard front-facing attack that can be used when Rygar is either standing up or ducking down, a curved overhead swing, and an airborne attack. It is also possible for Rygar to briefly stun enemies by jumping on them. There is no health in the game, and Rygar is immediately killed upon contact with an enemy (unless jumping on their head) or an enemy's projectile, or by falling from a platform.

Screenshot of the original arcade version of Rygar showing the HUD. Shown are the player's current score and rank (top left), their hi-score (top middle), the remaining time for the level (below hi-score), their remaining lives (bottom left), power-up slots (bottom middle), and current level number (bottom right).

There are five categories of items that the player can collect; bonus points, power-ups, extra lives, additional time, and screen bombs (destroys every enemy on the screen). These items can be found in stones that spawn from the earth and are occasionally dropped by defeated enemies. Power-ups boost the player's abilities, but they are not permanent and are lost when Rygar is killed. There are five different types of power-ups; Sun Power (a straight overhead attack to replace the standard circular attack), Crown Power (the ability to kill multiple enemies with one hit), Cross Power (temporary invincibility), Tiger Power (the ability to kill enemies by jumping on them), and Star Power (extension of the Diskarmor's range). Additionally, on rare occasions, a player may find an item with a question mark on it. Every time the player hits the item with the Diskarmor, the item changes into one of the above power-ups.

Each level has a time limit and if the player goes over this limit, a powerful fire monster appears and aggressively tries to kill the player. The longer the player evades him, the faster the monster gets. At the end of each of the 27 levels, there is a safe zone where the player's score is tallied.

The original arcade game also featured what Tecmo referred to as a "Buy-In" feature. When the player has lost all their lives (of which they begin with three), a countdown appears onscreen but if they insert more coins before it reaches zero, they can continue playing from the point of their furthest progression rather than restarting the game from the beginning. However, this option is only available in levels 1-20; during levels 21-27, if the player loses all their lives, they must restart the entire game. The reason for this was to prevent players paying their way to the end of the game by continually dying and resurrecting. Instead, Tecmo wanted to force players to develop the skills necessary to beat the last six levels. The game also utilised a hotseat mechanic whereby two players can play in turn, with each player's progression independent of the other's.

== Plot ==
The original arcade version of the game has no real plot beyond the opening text, which reads,

4.5 billion years have passed since Earth's creation. Many dominators have ruled in all their glory, but time was their greatest enemy and it defeated their reign. And now a new dominator's reign begins... (Note: 地球誕生以来45憶年 さまざまな支配者が この地球上に君臨して きた。そして今 また新たなる支配者争 いが始まる...; (text from original Japanese arcade game))

This "new dominator" is Ligar, a monster with the body of a large human male and the head of a lion, who is capable of jumping great distances. At the end of the game, Rygar fights Ligar in a large throne room, and after defeating him, a group of people arrive to celebrate with Rygar. Text then appears onscreen; "peace has again come to the world. A new resurrected threat may agian [sic] challenge you." (Note: 母び我々に、平和は戻った。しかし 何時また 新たなる 挑戦者が現れる かわからない; (text from original Japanese arcade game))

In the original Japanese arcade game, the player character was unnamed and referred to only as "Legendary Warrior." The game's final boss was named ライガー, which can be Romanized as both "Rygar" and "Ligar". This is because the Roman syllables "Ry" and "Li" both come from the same Japanese character, meaning there is no differentiation between "L" and "R" sounds. Due to this ambiguity, when the game was translated into English, the villain retained the name Ligar, but the hero was mistakenly called Rygar.

The Commodore 64, ZX Spectrum, and Amstrad CPC versions keep the opening text from the arcade version, but change the closing text to "Congratulations. You have defeated the evil tyranny." The Master System version of the game doesn't expand on the plot, but the text that appears upon completing the game is notably different from the arcade version:

The sword of cross [sic] was taken back and peace did again come to Argool. People regained their smiling faces. The warrior who finished his fight returned to Argus. The warrior of Argus - you are really a true hero. The End.

Aside from the NES version, the Atari Lynx version provides the most backstory to the events of the game. In this version, the opening text reads,

for millions of years, the kings ruled the land in peace and prosperity against the minions of darkness. Suddenly the creatures of destruction took over these nations and plunged the world into eternal evil. Now, after 10,000 years a new king has returned to battle for these lands.

The manual goes into further detail, explaining that millions of years earlier, a wizard banished the "minions of darkness" to the underworld, ushering in an era of peace and prosperity. Before he died, the wizard prophesied that the forces of darkness would rise again and humanity's only hope would be a hero recognisable by a birthmark — the Mark of the Wizard. At a later date, the darkness returned and began to conquer and subjugate humanity. 10,000 years passed, with humanity forced into tiny pockets of infertile land. Throughout that time, however, they never ceased hoping for the arrival of the prophesied hero. Rygar is that hero. The closing text in this version reads, "all hail the mighty warrior Rygar. Due to your bravery and skills, you have saved our people and returned peace to our land. Bravo Rygar, hero of Argool."

The X68000 version keeps both the opening and closing text from the arcade original.

== NES port ==
The 1987 NES port, released in Japan as Argos no Senshi: Hachamecha Daishingeki (Note: アルゴスの戦士 はちゃめちゃ大進撃; (lit.Warrior of Argus: Extreme Great Charge)) and in North America and Europe simply as Rygar, expanded considerably on the gameplay basics of the arcade original, incorporating action RPG elements into the platformer framework. The player character, his weapon, mode of attack, and many of the enemies remain the same, but the broader game mechanics are different. Whereas the arcade game is a standard side-scrolling platformer, the NES's Rygar is semi-open-ended, allowing the player to play nonlinearly and get stronger over time, gaining permanent traits such as increased health or strength via experience points rather than by collecting power-ups. In this sense, the game has gone on to be acknowledged as an important and very early example of the Metroidvania subgenre.

There are two types of experience point in the game; "Tone" and "Lasting". Tone increases Rygar's strength and how much damage he inflicts per hit, whereas lasting increases his health. Each time the player kills an enemy, both tone and lasting points are granted to the player. With tone, every kill adds a fraction of additional strength to the player's attack. With lasting, the player must reach a certain number of points, at which time they will be awarded with an additional health point. At the start of the game, the player has three health points but can earn up to twelve.

The game also features a rudimentary spellcasting mechanic. Rygar has access to three spells for the duration of the game; "Power-Up", "Attack & Assail", and "Recover". To use these spells, a certain amount of "Mind Points" are necessary. These Mind Points are in the form of stars which enemies randomly drop throughout the game. Power-Up requires three Mind Points and increases the speed, range, and damage of the Diskarmor until the player dies, at which time, it must be reactivated. Attack & Assail costs five points and after being cast, the next ten attacks will cause a flash that damages every on-screen enemy. Recover costs seven Mind Points, which is the maximum the player can have. This spell refills all of Rygar's health points.

Screenshot of the NES version of Rygar showing the hub area, which is played from a top-down perspective

Unlike all other versions of Rygar, the NES version is not exclusively side-scrolling. At the beginning of the game, Rygar has access to much of the game's map, via a hub-like central area, which is played from a top-down perspective. As the game progresses, new areas open up as a result of finding items such as the grappling hook, crossbow, and pulley, which allow Rygar to get past previously impassable obstacles. Rygar can also collect a coat of arms, which allows him to replenish his health in safe rooms. These safe rooms are occupied by NPCs who will give advice to the player.

Despite being considerably longer than all other versions of Rygar, the NES version did not have a password feature, nor did the cartridge contain a battery to facilitate saved games. This meant it had to be completed in a single playthrough. It did, however, have unlimited continues.

To accompany and promote the NES release of the game, three manga comics were published. Rygar: Birth of the Legendary Warrior (Note: アルゴスの戦士外伝 聖戦士誕生, Argus no Senshi: Sei Senshi Tanjō) recounts the plot of the game. Written by Rikio Harada, it was published by Keibunsha as #20 of their Adventure Hero's Books series. Rygar: The Broken Seal (Note: アルゴスの戦士 解かれたる封印, Argus no Senshi: Toka Retaru Fūin) is a "choose your own adventure" story set in 1987. Ligar has once again returned, and the reader must summon Rygar to defend humanity. Rygar: Crazy Advance (Note: アルゴスの戦士・はちゃめちゃ大進撃, Argus no Senshi: Wa Chamecha Dai Shingeki) is a dramatised guide book in narrative form. Written by Minazuki Yuu, it was published by Tokuma Shoten.

=== Plot ===
In this version of the game, Argool was once a utopian paradise run by the five Indora gods, until the evil Ligar attacked and corrupted everything that was sacred:

the sky of the holy place was completely covered with the flying castle of Ligar and his army of dangerous beasts. These animalized soldiers came down from the sky and committed the most atrocious cruelties. In a single day, they established the kingdom of EVIL. (Note: 聖地アルゴールの空を覆いつくすように、空飛ぶ城、獣王ライガーの牙城が出現したのだ。天空から舞い降りた獣人族は残虐の限りを尽し、一夜にして悪の帝国を築いた; (text from Japanese manual))

In addition, Ligar took the "Door of Peace", an important symbol of the peace that the Indora gods had created. Unable to find a hero amongst them capable of defeating Ligar, the people turned to an ancient prophecy, which states,

when the peaceful land is covered with EVIL SPIRITS, a brave soldier will be brought to life from the dead, for the purpose of saving persecuted people. (Note: 大地が獣に覆われし時、アルゴスの地より戦士蘇えりてこれを救わん; (text from Japanese manual))

The people fervently prayed for this soldier, and after some time, Rygar returned from the dead, setting out to defeat Ligar and restore peace and prosperity to the land. Rygar must visit the five Indora gods, each of whom will present him with an item necessary for defeating Ligar. After gaining the five items, Rygar must then travel to Ligar's floating castle for the final confrontation.

Upon defeating Ligar, Rygar enters the Door of Peace, restoring prosperity to the land and saving humanity. The closing text reads,

the door of peace was opened and peace did again come to Argool. People regained their smiling faces. The warrior who finished his fight returned to Argus. The warrior of Argus - you are really a true hero.

== Other ports ==
In 1987, the game was ported to the Commodore 64, ZX Spectrum, and Amstrad CPC by Probe Software and published by U.S. Gold. All three versions have significantly simplified graphics and reduced background details when compared to the arcade game. The music is also of lesser quality than in the arcade. Unique to the Commodore 64 version is that some of the enemies run extremely fast. In this version, the original 27 levels have been cut down to 16, and there is no final boss. Instead, the game simply ends after the final zone, and the player is presented with a congratulatory message: "Congratulations. You have defeated the evil tyranny." In the Spectrum version, while the complete 27 stages are included, it too is missing the final boss. The Amstrad version also has 27 levels, but they are not the same as the arcade version - instead there is little variation between them, with lava fields and flowing streams recycled over and over again, cast against a constant black backdrop. The final boss has also been omitted. Instead, the game ends abruptly when the player reaches the final room. Both the Spectrum and Amstrad ports feature the same final text as the Commodore version.

The Master System version was released in 1988, exclusively in Japan, under the name Argos no Juujiken. (Note: アルゴスの十字剣; (lit.Cross-Sword of Argus)) It is much closer to the arcade version than prior releases, although the 27 levels have been compressed into five much longer levels. These levels feature the occasional branching path, allowing the player to select from above-ground and underground routes. It also adds two new bosses in addition to the final boss. This version was developed and published by Salio, Inc., a dummy corporation created by Tecmo to allow them to circumvent Nintendo's exclusivity policy for third-party publishers.

The Atari Lynx port was developed by Haehn Software and published by Atari Corporation in 1990. In this version some levels are different, and there are only 23. Additionally, the player cannot throw their shield above them unless they acquire the required power-up (in the original game, the power-up simply strengthens and improves the player's default upward attack). This version expands the original story, and the end of game boss is considerably more monstrous, bigger, and tougher than in any prior version.

The X68000 version was released in 1994, exclusively in Japan, and was developed and published by Dempa Micomsoft as volume nine of their Video Game Anthology series. This version very closely matches the source material. The graphics, music, sound effects, controls, and animations are a near exact match to the arcade, and all 27 levels and the final boss are the same as found in the original.

== Reception ==
Reception

Review scores
Publication	Score					
Publication	CPC	Arcade	Atari Lynx	C64	NES	ZX
AllGame		3.5/5			4.5/5	
Aktueller Software Markt				68%		
Amstrad Action	56%					
Commodore User				2/10		
Crash						58%
Computer and Video Games		2/4	46%			68%
Famitsu			5/10, 6/10, 6/10, 4/10			
IGN		6/10	7/10			
Joystick					70%	
Raze			81%			
Sinclair User						5/10
Tilt					5/5	
Your Sinclair						8/10
Zzap!64				57%		
Computer Entertainer					8/8	

Rygar received mixed reviews across its various platforms. Whilst the NES version was generally very well-received, both the original arcade game and its other ports received more criticism.

AllGame's Michael W. Dean scored the arcade version 3.5 out of 5, arguing, "it just doesn't quite hit the mark." He praised the graphics, enemy design, and controls, but was critical of the game's repetitive nature and high difficulty level, writing, "Rygar is a decent title, but it's decidedly less than captivating." IGN's Thomas M. Lucas scored this version 6 out of 10, calling it "a bit bland." He was especially critical of the high difficulty level, and concluded, the "limited scope of the design mean[s] you'll probably tire of it quickly." Computer and Video Games's Clare Edgeley scored it 2 out of 4, criticising it for being "fiendishly difficult."

Tilt's Alain Huyghues-Lacour scored the NES version 5 out of 5, calling it "an impeccable arcade adaptation." He particularly praised the gameplay and controls, whilst his main criticism concerned the absence of a password system or save feature. Computer Entertainer praised the graphics ("some of the best visual displays yet seen on this system"), the sound, the combat, the enemies, the differentiated locations, and the use of two different visual perspectives. They concluded, "Rygar delivers excellent gaming value." AllGame's Michael W. Dean scored it 4.5 out of 5, praising the "excellent control and pacing [and] the freedom of nonlinear level design." His main criticism was the lack of a password system or save feature. Joystick scored it 70%, criticising the story, but praising the "perfect handling" and lauding the use of infinite continues.

In a 2006 retrospective, Michael Plasket of Hardcore Gaming 101 wrote, "maybe Rygar does seem a little basic and bare-bones compared to later action-RPGs, but for 1987, it's mighty impressive." In 2020, Kotaku's Peter Tieryas commended the game for its expansive world and nonlinear gameplay relative to the standard of video games at the time of its release; "Rygar encouraged exploration and going off the beaten path at a time when that very concept was still novel." Both Plasket and Tieryas acknowledge the game as an important early example of the Metroidvania subgenre.

Aktueller Software Markt's Philipp Kleimann scored the Commodore 64 version 68%. He was critical of the game's difficulty and speed, arguing that the enemies were far too fast, concluding, "Rygar didn't knock me off my feet, but it did get my adrenaline levels going." Zzap!64's Julian Rignall and Steve Jarratt scored this version 57%. Jarratt called it "a simple and totally forgettable Ghosts 'n Goblins variant" and was especially critical of the graphics, citing "ill-defined sprites." He concluded by asking "what does Rygar offer that we haven't seen many times before?" Of the gameplay, Rignall wrote, "there's very little variety, and consequently, the appeal wears off quite quickly." Commodore User's Nick Kelly scored it 2 out of 10, criticising the graphics and controls. He also felt there was no differentiation between levels, and he concluded, "if Rygar sold for £1.99 it would be a poor piece of budget software by today's standards. To release it as a full top-of-the-range coin-op conversion is just a bad joke."

Your Sinclair's David Powell scored the Spectrum version 8 out 10. Although he was critical of the graphics, he saw the game as a "fair-ish arcade conversion, but an absolute cracker in its own right." Computer and Video Games's Tim Metcalfe scored this version 68%. He was very critical of the graphics, but wrote, "ignore the graphics and play the game. Soon you'll be hooked." Crash scored it 58%, finding it "acceptably playable." Sinclair User's Jim Douglas scored it 5 out of 10. He was critical of the graphics, calling them, "tacky, titchy and chock-a-block full of attribute clash." He concluded, "Rygar is a strictly run-of-the-mill experience."

Amstrad Action's Chris Boothman scored the Amstrad version 56%. He found the graphics "lacking in clarity", and was especially critical of the collision detection, concluding, "I quite enjoyed it as a game. It's easy to get into with a good difficulty increment."

Raze's Julian Boardman scored the Lynx version 81%, writing, "it hardly breaks new ground but does what it sets out to do very professionally." IGN's Robert A. Jung scored this version 7 out of 10. He commended how close it was to the arcade original, but called the port, "neither extremely outstanding nor truly disappointing." CVG scored it 46%, writing, "the run-and-bash gameplay isn't too stimulating, and there is no significant variation from level to level." STart's Clayton Walnum opined, "Rygar is not recommended for serious adventurers, but rather for jump-and-shoot arcade enthusiasts."

=== Earnings and legacy ===
The original arcade game did well financially. In June 1986, it entered the Japanese top 25 arcade game charts at #6. By July, it had risen to #3. It dropped out of the top ten in August. It dropped out of the top 20 in September. It ultimately went on to be Japan's seventh highest-grossing arcade game of 1986. By July 1987, Rygar was one of the top-ten arcade games in Europe, ranking at #9. The following month, it climbed to #6. It remained in that position through to January 1988. In October 1986, it was ranked #7 in a national poll on arcade machines carried out by Play Meter. In January 1987, Game Machine's "Players Choice" award for 1986's Best Software saw it ranked #15.

In the July/August 1988 edition of Nintendo Power (the magazine's inaugural issue), Rygar was at #30 on the top 30 NES games chart, as voted on by fans. In issue two (September/October), it rose to #24. In the next issue (November/December), it rose to #20.

In 2009, IGN ranked the NES version at #59 in their list of the top 100 NES games. In 2012, they ranked the Diskarmor at #93 on their list of the top 100 video game weapons. In 2024, Paste ranked the NES version at #37 in their list of the best 100 NES games. Also in 2024, CBR ranked the Lynx version at #5 in their list of the top ten Lynx games.

As of June 2007, Rygar and its various ports, emulations, and remakes have sold 1.5 million units across all platforms.

== Emulations ==
In 2005, Rygar was included in the Tecmo Classic Arcade compilation for Xbox. Also in 2005, it was released for Sprint mobile phones. In 2009, it was released on the Virtual Console for the Wii. This version offered customizable screen settings, allowing the player to stretch, shrink, expand, and shift the main screen. The default setting presents the game centered on screen, with black bars aligned on the left and right if running on a widescreen TV, but the options allow the player to scale up to 16:9 if they wish. In 2014, the original arcade version was made available in Japan and North America for the PlayStation 4 via the Arcade Archives program. In 2018, it was released for the Nintendo Switch as part of the Nintendo Classics service. In 2023, it was released for Android phones.

An unofficial fan-made port of Rygar was released for Amiga AGA machines in 2019.

== Remakes ==
In 2002, Rygar: The Legendary Adventure (Note: アルゴスの戦士, Argus no Senshi; (lit. Warrior of Argus)) was released for PlayStation 2. Developed by Tecmo, it is a complete remake, featuring 3D graphics and a semi-destructible environment. It also features an entirely new plot, which takes inspiration and characters from Greek and Roman mythology. It was released to generally positive reviews. In 2009, a remaster of Legendary Adventure was released for Wii, under the name Rygar: The Battle of Argus. (Note: アルゴスの戦士: マッスルインパクト, Argus no Senshi: Massuru Inpakuto; (lit. Warrior of Argus: Muscle Impact)) Developed by Team Tachyon, it was released to generally negative reviews.
