= Rakushou! Pachi-Slot Sengen =

- Rakushou! Pachi-Slot Sengen 6: Rio 2 Cruising Vanadis cover
- Genre(s): Slot machine simulation
- Developer(s): Tecmo
- Publisher(s): Tecmo
- Platform(s): PlayStation 2
- Original release: JP: October 23, 2003

Rakushou! Pachi-Slot Sengen is a series of pachi-slot (Japanese slot machine) simulation games from Tecmo primarily for the PlayStation 2. While early games in the series featured several of Tecmo's real-life gambling machines, the fifth and sixth games focused on the Rio line of machines, as well as their star, Rio Rollins Tachibana, a character who later appeared in the 2010 Dead or Alive Paradise game, starred in the 2011 anime television series Rio: Rainbow Gate!, and appeared playable in the 2017 action game Warriors All-Stars.

== Games ==
- Rakushou! Pachi-Slot Sengen - October 23, 2003 for PlayStation 2
- Rakushou! Pachi-Slot Sengen 2 - October 28, 2004 for PlayStation 2
- Rakushou! Pachi-Slot Sengen 3 - May 23, 2005 for PlayStation 2
- Rakushou! Pachi-Slot Sengen 4 - March 23, 2006 for PlayStation 2
- Rakushou! Pachi-Slot Sengen 5: Rio Paradise - April 5, 2007 for PlayStation 2
- Rakushou! Pachi-Slot Sengen 6: Rio 2 Cruising Vanadis - May 14, 2009 for PlayStation 2

== See also ==
- Pachinko
