= Gallop Racer 2003: A New Breed =

2002 video game by Tecmo

- NTSC version cover art
- Developer: Tecmo
- Publishers: WW: Tecmo; EU: ZOO Digital
- Series: Gallop Racer
- Platform: PlayStation 2
- Release: JP: December 12, 2002; NA: April 1, 2003; EU: October 17, 2003
- Genre: Alternative sports (horse racing)
- Modes: Single-player, multiplayer

Gallop Racer 2003: A New Breed, known in Japan as Gallop Racer 6: Revolution (ギャロップレーサー6 -レボリューション-, Gyaroppu Rēsā 6 -Reboryūshon-), and in Europe as At the Races Presents Gallop Racer, is a horse racing video game developed and published by Tecmo, released in 2002-2003 for the PlayStation 2.

== Reception ==
Reception

Aggregate score
Aggregator	Score
Metacritic	68/100

Review scores
Publication	Score
Famitsu	28/40
Game Informer	8.5/10
GamePro	3.5/5
GameRevolution	B
GameSpot	5.4/10
GameSpy	3/5
IGN	7.9/10
Official U.S. PlayStation Magazine	3/5
PlayStation: The Official Magazine	8/10
X-Play	4/5

The game received "average" reviews according to the review aggregation website Metacritic. In Japan, Famitsu gave it a score of 28 out of 40.
