= Gallop Racer 2004 =

2004 video game by Tecmo

- PAL cover
- Developer: Tecmo
- Publishers: WW: Tecmo; PAL: ZOO Digital
- Series: Gallop Racer
- Platform: PlayStation 2
- Release: JP: February 19, 2004; NA: August 30, 2004; EU: March 11, 2005; AU: 2005
- Genre: Alternative sports (horse racing)
- Modes: Single-player, multiplayer

Gallop Racer 2004, known in Japan as Gallop Racer Lucky 7 (ギャロップレーサー ラッキー7, Gyaroppu Rēsā Rakkī 7), and in the PAL region as Gallop Racer 2, is a horse racing video game developed and published by Tecmo, released in 2004 for the PlayStation 2.

== Reception ==
Reception

Aggregate score
Aggregator	Score
Metacritic	70/100

Review scores
Publication	Score
Famitsu	31/40
Game Informer	8.25/10
GameSpot	6.2/10
GameSpy	3/5
GameZone	8.3/10
IGN	7.2/10
Official U.S. PlayStation Magazine	4/5
Play	35%
PlayStation: The Official Magazine	7/10
X-Play	2/5

The game received "average" reviews according to the review aggregation website Metacritic. In Japan, Famitsu gave it a score of three eights and one seven for a total of 31 out of 40.
