= Zing Zing Zip =

1992 video game

- Arcade flyer
- Developer: Allumer
- Publisher: Tecmo
- Platform: Arcade
- Release: JP: September 1992; NA: November 1992
- Genre: Scrolling shooter
- Modes: Single-player, multiplayer

Zing Zing Zip (Note: Japanese: ジンジンジップ, Hepburn: Jin Jin Jippu) is a 1992 vertically scrolling shooter video game developed by Allumer and published by Tecmo for arcades. It was released in Japan in September 1992 and North America in November 1992. Hamster Corporation acquired the game's rights alongside Allumer's catalogue, releasing the game as part of their Arcade Archives series for the Nintendo Switch and PlayStation 4 in September 2023.

== Gameplay ==
The player controls one of two fighter planes that has an advantage in either vertical or horizontal movement, who navigates various levels and defeats enemies with bullets and bomb attacks. Power-ups can be used to upgrade the plane's ammunition with missiles and increase their firepower. Unlike most shooters, a barrel roll function is available, allowing the player to dodge incoming gunfire and temporarily become invincible.
