= Final Star Force =

1992 video game

- Japanese arcade flyer
- Developer: Tecmo
- Publisher: Tecmo
- Series: Star Force
- Platform: Arcade
- Release: WW: November 1992
- Genre: Scrolling shooter
- Modes: Single-player, multiplayer

Gameplay screenshot

Final Star Force (Note: Japanese: ファイナル・スターフォース, Hepburn: Fainaru Sutā Fōsu) is a 1992 vertically scrolling shooter video game developed and published by Tecmo for arcades. It is the third and final entry in the Star Force series, and retains many of the same mechanics as its predecessors. Players control the two space fighter ships Blue Nova and Red Nova. There are three different power-ups to choose from called "Pulsators". The power meter itself charges up automatically to increase their fighters' power.

Hamster Corporation released the game as part of their Arcade Archives series for the Nintendo Switch and PlayStation 4 in January 2025.

== Reception ==
Game Machine listed Final Star Force as being Japan's eighteenth most popular arcade game of December 1992. Jay Carter of Electronic Game magazine compared its gameplay to Xevious, and liked the game's bright and detailed backdrops. The game's mostly negative reputation and poor sales, however, led to Tecmo pulling it from sale shortly after its release.
