= Champion Jockey: G1 Jockey & Gallop Racer =

2011 video game

- European Wii box art
- Developers: Tecmo Koei; Kou Shibusawa (Switch)
- Publisher: Tecmo Koei
- Series: G1 Jockey; Gallop Racer
- Platforms: PlayStation 3, Wii, Xbox 360, Nintendo Switch
- Release: EU: September 2, 2011; JP/AU: September 22, 2011; NA: November 8, 2011 (PS3 and Wii); Nintendo Switch: JP: September 14, 2017
- Genre: Alternative sports (horse racing)
- Modes: Single-player, multiplayer

Champion Jockey: G1 Jockey & Gallop Racer is a 2011 horse racing simulator video game developed and published by Tecmo Koei for the PlayStation 3, Wii and Xbox 360. The game replicates real-life events such as the Jockey's Cup (also known as the Breeders Cup) and the Louisville Derby (also known as the Kentucky Derby). The Xbox 360 version was not released in North America. A Nintendo Switch port, titled Champion Jockey Special, was released exclusively in Japan in 2017.

Released shortly after Koei and Tecmo merged in 2009, Champion Jockey is a loose crossover between two horse racing game series that they developed while as separate companies: Tecmo's Gallop Racer series and Koei's G1 Jockey series. It is the first game in either series to be available on a Microsoft console and have a Nintendo console version localized for North America.

== Gameplay ==
All versions of the game allow the player to choose between motion controllers (Wii Remote and Nunchuk, PlayStation Move, Kinect or Joy-Con, depending on the platform) or traditional pad controls, with the latter being implemented with Classic Controller on Wii and the Nintendo Switch Pro Controller for Special on Switch. The Wii version also supports, but does not require, the Wii Balance Board. There are nineteen playable racecourses in all, which are unlicensed, fictionalized versions of real-life horse racing courses around the world.

The Japan-exclusive Special also features connectivity with the Nintendo Switch version of Winning Post 8, a contemporary installment of another horse racing series developed by Koei and mostly exclusive to Japan, allowing steeds and riders created in one game to appear in the other.

== Downloadable content ==
All versions had eight downloadable content packs that were available to purchase: four music packs, three extra mount/jockey packs and one "Champion Code" pack required for online play. One of the mount/jockey packs called the "Special Pack" added the option to race with a roadbike or special "motoskates". The PlayStation 3 had a unique Medieval themed mount/jockey pack.
