= Ganbare Ginkun =

1995 video game

- Arcade flyer
- Developer: Tecmo
- Publisher: Tecmo
- Platform: Arcade
- Release: JP: September 1995
- Genre: Party
- Modes: Single-player, multiplayer

Ganbare Ginkun (Note: Japanese: がんばれギンくん, Hepburn: Ganbare Ginkun) is a 1995 party video game developed and published by Tecmo for arcades. It was released only in Japan in September 1995. The player character would become a recurring monster in the Monster Rancher series, in which he is named Doodle. A CD of the game's soundtrack can be used to unlock the monster in Monster Rancher for the PlayStation.

Hamster Corporation planned to release the game as part of their Arcade Archives series for the Nintendo Switch and PlayStation 4 in 2020. Due to the game's highly graphic and sexual content, the game could not pass Nintendo or Sony Interactive Entertainment's censors, stalling the game's release outside arcade machines.

== Gameplay ==
Up to two players control crudely drawn stick figures who partake in various surreal minigames, reaching a requirement of some kind in order to progress to the next minigame. Minigames include blasting a severed head into the sky and trying to land it on a body (failure results in Ruy Ramos dribbling the bloody head), extinguishing a bomb with Manneken Pis, shooting a cannon into a person, trying not to drop babies into the sea and whipping bears for bad posture. The winner can choose the next minigame until either player loses all their lives.
