= Tokobot =

2005 video game

Tokobot Karakuri
- European PSP cover art
- Developer: Tecmo
- Publishers: WW: Tecmo; PAL: Take-Two Interactive
- Platforms: PlayStation Portable, PlayStation 2
- Release: PlayStation Portable: NA: December 5, 2005; JP: December 15, 2005; EU: April 7, 2006; PlayStation 2: NA: October 24, 2006; JP: October 26, 2006; EU: December 28, 2006; AU: January 25, 2007
- Genre: Platform
- Mode: Single-player

Tokobot, later released in Japan as Karakuri (カラクリ, Karakuri), is a puzzle-platform game developed and published by Tecmo for the PlayStation Portable in 2005. An expanded version was later released for the PlayStation 2, titled Tokobot Plus: Mysteries of the Karakuri in North America, Europe and Australia and Korobot Adventure (コロボットアドベンチャー, Korobotto Adobenchā) in Japan.

== Plot ==
The game revolves around Bolt, an agent from Canewood's Lab. His first research expedition leads him to discover rare Karakuri robots known as Tokobots, one of which is Zero, a prototype gigantic, planet-destroying robot programmed for evil. Bolt must discover the secrets of the ruins, find Zero, and destroy it before it can destroy his world.

There are three human villains in the game who own robots and battle Bolt with large Karakuri robots: Flames, Bart, and Colonel Fuel (in order of appearance).

== Gameplay ==
The player controls Bolt, who makes use of the Tokobots to explore the prehistoric ruins found in the game. The Tokobots mimic Bolt's actions and can be used together in "joint actions", complex tasks that include fusing them together to make Karakuri combinations. Combinations can do almost anything, from activating dead gears to shooting laser beams.

There are two types of Karakuri robots, both of which come in varying sizes: Workers and Keepers. Workers do odd jobs and include small Clunkers and the large Tornader. Keepers protect the ancient ruins and include tiny Beepers and the evil Zero.

== Versions ==
The PlayStation 2 version of the game adds secret platforming sections that allow players access to hidden treasures. In addition, players no longer have control over the Overdrive forms; they now only briefly appear to attack before disappearing.

== Reception ==
Reception

Aggregate score
Aggregator	Score	
Aggregator	PS2	PSP
Metacritic	66/100	72/100

Review scores
Publication	Score	
Publication	PS2	PSP
Edge	N/A	5/10
Electronic Gaming Monthly	N/A	5.17/10 (Note: Three critics of Electronic Gaming Monthly gave the PSP version each a score of 5.5/10, 4/10, and 6/10.)
Eurogamer	5/10	6/10
Famitsu	28/40	31/40
Game Informer	7.25/10	8.25/10
GameRevolution	C−	N/A
GameSpot	7.2/10	8.2/10
GameSpy	3/5	2.5/5
GameZone	6.9/10	N/A
Hardcore Gamer	4/5	3.5/5
IGN	7/10	7.5/10
Official U.S. PlayStation Magazine	N/A	3.5/5
PlayStation: The Official Magazine	4/10	7/10
X-Play	N/A	3/5

Tokobot and Tokobot Plus received "average" reviews according to the review aggregation website Metacritic. In Japan, Famitsu gave it a score of three eights and one seven for a total of 31 out of 40 for the PSP version, and 28 out of 40 for the PS2 version.

Mr. Marbles of GamePro's February 2006 issue called Tokobot "a technological treat, with virtually zero loading, crisp colors, and a pleasingly quirky little soundtrack. There's no multiplayer, though Tokobot's single-player is engrossing enough to soak up your valuable attention for a good eight hours." (Note: GamePro gave the PSP version two 4/5 scores for graphics and sound, and two 4.5/5 scores for control and fun factor.) Ten issues later, however, Kilgore called Tokobot Plus "a decent title with challenging puzzles that will reward your patience and dedication. It's probably best as an extended rental but some of you might find that it's worth the full price of admission." (Note: GamePro gave the PlayStation 2 version two 2.5/5 scores for graphics and sound, 3/5 for control, and 3.5/5 for fun factor.)
