= Tecmo Baseball =

1989 baseball video game

- Cover art
- Developer: Tecmo
- Publisher: Tecmo
- Platform: Nintendo Entertainment System
- Release: NA: January 1989
- Genre: Sports
- Modes: Single-player, multiplayer

Tecmo Baseball is a baseball video game developed by Tecmo for the Nintendo Entertainment System. It was released in January 1989 exclusively for the North American market.

== Summary ==
There are three modes in the game; one-player, two-player, and watch (zero-player). In addition to games between teams, there is also an all-star game with the best players in the game.

The game features a National division (comparable to the National League) and an American division (comparable to the American League, although both divisions only include seven teams each. The National teams are: St. Louis, San Francisco, New York, Cincinnati, Los Angeles, Atlanta and Chicago. The American division teams are: Minnesota, Detroit, Milwaukee, New York, Boston, California, and Texas.

All the players on the teams have names and statistics similar to those of real Major League ballplayers. For example, a player on the Detroit team was named Arex but his statistics were those of Alan Trammell of the Detroit Tigers in 1987. The best teams in the game are St. Louis and Minnesota, the two teams that played each other in the 1987 World Series.

== Reception ==
Computer Entertainer scored the game 7 out of 8 stars.
