= Karate Blazers =

1991 video game

- Arcade flyer
- Developer: Video System
- Publishers: JP: Tecmo; WW: McO'River
- Platform: Arcade
- Release: JP: August 1991; NA: September 1991
- Genre: Beat 'em up
- Modes: Single-player, multiplayer

Karate Blazers (Note: Japanese: 闘神ブレイザーズ, Hepburn: Tōshin Bureizāzu) is a 1991 beat 'em up video game developed by Video System and published by Tecmo for arcades. It was released in Japan in August 1991 and in North America in September 1991. Two characters from the game eventually appeared in Aero Fighters 3 as playable characters. Hamster Corporation released the game as part of their Arcade Archives series for the Nintendo Switch and PlayStation 4 in November 2025. A Sega Genesis port was planned but never released.

== Gameplay ==
Players control four martial artists who aim to recover scrolls and their deceased master's daughter. Players can punch and kick enemies, as well as unleash special moves that can hit multiple enemies at the cost of some health. Scrolls can be collected to unleash an even stronger special move that is limited in supply. Levels end after players beat the boss character of each level.
