= Super Star Force: Jikūreki no Himitsu =

1986 video game

- Cover art
- Developer: Tecmo
- Publisher: Tecmo
- Composer: Mikio Saito
- Platform: Family Computer
- Release: JP: November 11, 1986
- Genres: Shoot 'em up, adventure
- Mode: Single-player

Super Star Force: Jikūreki no Himitsu (スーパースターフォース 時空暦の秘密; lit. "Secrets of the Space-Time Calendar") is a vertically-scrolling shoot 'em up adventure video game developed and published by Tecmo on November 11, 1986 for the Family Computer only in Japan.

The game was featured in episode 111 (14th Season) of GameCenter CX.

While this video game was originally assigned by Hudson Soft to be the publisher, Tecmo (then known as Tehkan) decided to both develop and publish the game as they were the official copyright owners.

== Gameplay ==
Fighting against Gordess, the final boss of the game.

The game is the sequel to Tecmo's famous shoot 'em up arcade game, Star Force. Unlike most shoot 'em ups during the time of its release, Super Star Force is a combination of a shoot 'em up and an adventure game. Players must go back in time in order to defeat the evil planet Gordess, but the seven time stones must be collected from each level's hidden dungeon. Taking advantage of the time travel opportunities during the game can help to unravel the mysteries of "time and space". Players have to simply repeat the actions of the distant past in order to progress.

The game starts in the year DA (Dimension Almanac) 2010 and players must destroy the enemies in the past so that the player can confront the final boss in the year Anno Domini 2137. When the player's ship is destroyed while navigating through the air, his score time is cut in half. The highest possible score in the game is 99,990, which is used as currency in the dungeons and the time travel sequences. A completely non-linear structure allows players to travel back in time nearly at will. The farther away in time that the player wants to travel to, the more "time units" are required to reach the destination, acting like the player's fuel supply. After accomplishing the missions that can be done through the spacecraft, the player must land on the ground and accomplish missions on foot.

External videos
- Video of the Famicom video game Super Star Force: Jikūreki no Himitsu (part 1 of 4)

While the player is stationed on the ground, this video game functions as a dungeon exploration game with shoot 'em up elements. This game has two endings; a happy ending where the history of the planet has been saved and a sad ending where the revelations of Gordess' resurrection has come true. After achieving a game over, players can press the start button to continue the game (in the year 2010) with all their possessions intact as long as they don't press the reset button or turn off the console.

== Characters ==
Ralph
The protagonist of the game, who is the male pilot of the Neo Final Star time traveling starship.
Norm
He sells items and gives hints to Ralph for solving the key to the adventure. The Solomon Key is the item that appeared in hourglass and is the property of Norm. His physical appearance during the game is in a red suit of armor with sharp horns on top of the helmet.

== Time periods ==
DA 0001 (Ending of the Fetal Movement)
The legendary underground slave-owning empire of Erujinba exists near a vast number of distinctive volcanoes. Through the crater of a volcano, the entrance to the empire can be accessed by the player. Unlike the other stages, there is no infinite looping with the areas. The flying components of this level would end at their appropriate end point. Players can return to this timeline at any time without consuming their "time points", suggesting that this era is literally the "beginning of time".
DA 0316 (Genesis)
This era is characterized by rugged mountains and huge pieces of inorganic ground materials. There are giant ground drawings made by primitive people who hope for the return of their deity Birakocha. A group of savage demons defend a mighty labyrinth from within.
DA 0820 (The Dawn)
Filled with numerous monuments to the past, this level is the most important in the game. The entrance to the Erudorera Forest Demon ruins have been closed; the key to opening it is the Statue of Dorera. There are unique airborne enemies that do not appear in any other stage. An item here needs to be acquired before traveling to the final stage (2317) becomes plausible.
DA 1003 (Period of the Jukai)
This era is represented by a lush jungle. There is a temple of mystery called Jukai Madagu-Tem Oates, which obscures the scenery. The Lemurian continent in the year 1301 would reveal an underwater volcano, which erupted underneath this temple. A gate that blocks entrance to the temple is opened by "consuming time".
DA 1301 (Ending Hills Era)
This era is represented by a lush ocean. The legendary sunken Lemurian continent was submerged beneath the ocean due to the deformation of the Earth's crust. During this era, the Ganimu behemoth is not yet born but appears in the world in the form of an egg. Destroying the egg in this time period will prevent the Boolean Shang city-state from being eliminated by the behemoth in the future (when it reaches adult form).
DA 1608 (Ice Age)
Civilization in this period has been destroyed by the Boolean Shang city-state's visions of the behemoth Ganimu. The Boolean Shang city-state was once thought of as being a "super-civilization".
DA 2010 (Present Day)
The player's adventure starts here, which is considered to the present day according to the in-game story. Gordess was defeated in this era in the previous game. Player is about to investigate how the current calendar (Dimension Alamanac) has even started.
AD 2317 (revealed to be planet Earth in the past)
Skyscrapers dominate this futuristic city in the sky while a barrage of enemy fighters help to defend the surroundings from the player. Returning to the other stages is impossible once reaching this level. If a certain item is not found, then the Seal of Gordess cannot be opened, leading into the game's bad ending. This level also has a maze of hidden secrets that must be navigated.

== Reception ==
The game received a total score of 27 out of 40 from the four reviewers of Famicom Tsūshin (Famitsu). Video Game Den gave the game a score of 3 stars out of a possible 5 in their 2010 overview.
