= Secret of the Stars =

1993 video game

- North American cover art
- Developer: Tecmo
- Publisher: Tecmo
- Platform: Super Nintendo Entertainment System
- Release: JP: November 5, 1993; NA: July 1995
- Genre: Role-playing
- Mode: Single-player

Secret of the Stars, known as Aqutallion (アクタリオン) in Japan, is a 1993 role-playing video game developed and published by Tecmo for the Super Nintendo Entertainment System.

== Gameplay ==
Battle mode screenshot

Secret of the Stars uses a turn-based RPG battle system where actions in battle are selected through a menu and actions are presented at the end of the turn. Gameplay switches between two parties throughout the game and certain areas are inaccessible without the right party.

== Plot ==
The main character, Ray, and his party of Aqutallion warriors embark on a quest to find and destroy Homncruse, the evil power threatening their world. Ray begins his journey alone on a tiny island, but eventually he meets his friends and fellow Aqutallion warriors: Tina, Cody, Leona and Dan, and even creates a town for the victims of Homncruse's evil to live. Villains encountered along the way tend to range from comical, such as Cat Boo and Badbad, to the more sinister elite generals of Homncruse.

Initially, all the teens are considered Pennon, the lowest rank of warrior. Before they can destroy Homncruse, each of them must undergo a trial at their respective temples hidden around the world to receive the secondary powers of Banalet. Dan is an exception because he is the descendant of the Prosperous Wise Man clan of Aqutallion. When Ray, Tina, Cody, and Leona achieve the status of Banalet and are united by the powers of Dan, Aqutallion is reborn and the group gains incredible powers.

The Aqutallions are not alone: eleven members of Kustera can be recruited to fight for the young warriors in their place for a time being. The Kustera are mostly meant to serve as a supplement to the Aqutallions, but their role in the story is vital to its progression. From the same temples where the Aqutallions gain their Banalet status, there is a Kustera-only warp icon that sends the group to a dungeon where great treasures are hidden.

== Reception ==
Reception

Aggregate score
Aggregator	Score
GameRankings	45% (5 reviews)

Review scores
Publication	Score
Electronic Gaming Monthly	8.5/10, 7/10, 7/10, 6.5/10
Famitsu	19/40

Secret of the Stars received moderately positive reviews. On release, the four reviewers of Electronic Gaming Monthly were critical of the graphics, but felt that the highly involving story more than made up for them. GamePro praised the game's monster designs, calling it "X-Files with a sense of humor." However, they considered the game's winning feature to be its combination of accessible gameplay mechanics with heavy challenge, summarizing that "kiddie characters and an easy-to-use RPG design will appeal to young beginners, but the epic-length adventure and multitude of monsters will challenge wily RPG vets."
