= Senjyo =

1983 video game

- Arcade flyer
- Developer: Tehkan
- Publisher: Tehkan
- Platforms: Arcade, MSX
- Release: JP: November1983
- Genre: Fixed shooter
- Modes: Single-player, multiplayer

Senjyo (Note: Japanese: センジョウ, Hepburn: Senjō) is a 1983 fixed shooter video game developed and published by Tehkan for arcades. It was released only in Japan in November 1983.

== Gameplay ==
The gameplay involves the player controlling a fixed turret on a tank shooting oncoming alien enemies through a cross-hair target. A certain number of enemies must be destroyed to progress to the next stage.

The game employs the use of pseudo-3D graphical effects to give the illusion of a three-dimensional landscape. However, the player's tank is fixed in a single location, whereas the enemies can move across the landscape.

== Release ==
The arcade game was released in Japan in 1983. In North America, it was demonstrated at AMOA 1984. The game was ported and published by Sony Corporation in 1984 for MSX computers. In 2005, Senjyo was re-released exclusively on the Xbox, as part of the Tecmo Classic Arcade collection. Hamster Corporation released the game as part of their Arcade Archives series for the Nintendo Switch and PlayStation 4 in January 2023.

== Reception ==
In Japan, Game Machine listed Senjyo on their January 1, 1984 issue as being the second most-successful new table arcade unit of the month.

Zelmo of Video Games magazine reviewed the arcade game following its AMOA 1984 demonstration, comparing the gameplay favorably with the 1983 Atari 2600 games Battlezone and Robot Tank while praising the "very nice" graphics, effects and "three-dimensional" landscape. However, the reviewer said the player's "restricted movement" compared to "the maneuverability of the various enemies" made it "frustrating" and could limit the game's arcade audience, concluding that, for "the home this effort would have some promise, but as an arcade game it might be just a little off base."
