= Gallop Racer =

Video game series

- PAL cover artwork of attheraces Presents Gallop Racer, known as Gallop Racer 2003 in the USA
- Genre(s): Horse racing
- Developer(s): Tecmo
- Publisher(s): Tecmo; Koei Tecmo
- Platform(s): Arcade, PlayStation, PlayStation 2, Microsoft Windows, PlayStation 3, Wii, Xbox 360, iOS, Android, Nintendo Switch
- First release: Gallop Racer: WW: September 27, 1996
- Latest release: Champion Jockey Special: JP: September 14, 2017

Gallop Racer (ギャロップレーサー, Gyaroppu Rēsā) is a series of horse racing video games, created by Tecmo.

== Overview ==
Gallop Racer is an open-ended racing game in which the player purchases horses to train, race and breed. Most games in the series involve management of horses, with the exception of Gallop Racer 2004, which focuses more on the jockeying riders. Horses are divided into four leg types: frontrunner, preceder, midrunner and closer, and the player must carefully choose the best leg type suited for each race to have the best stamina and strength available. Race course terrain can either be dirt or turf, with horses excelling in either or both terrain types. Due to licensing issues, the series does not use the names of real-life horse breeds, jockey contests or famous race courses, a trait that also carries over to the crossover game Champion Jockey: G1 Jockey & Gallop Racer. Races are divided into four classes based on horse quality and type of race: open, grade III, grade II and grade I. Higher-graded and more difficult races are unavailable from the start and must be unlocked by accomplishing certain achievements and winning certain races. Race course lengths range from 5 furlongs (5/8 mile) to 20 furlongs (2.5 miles) and are designed to closely resemble real-life courses in distance and shape in spite of an inability to secure licensing rights to use their official names.

== Games ==
Most games in the series are available on early Sony consoles, with early installments available on arcade machines. All games in the series are available in Japan, with sequels utilizing standard sequel numeration. The first Gallop Racer home video game available in North America is a port of the third game of the series and is plainly titled Gallop Racer. When most of that game's subsequent sequels were localized for North America, they would be numerated on the basis of their year of release there in a convention not dissimilar to annually released sports games in various EA Sports franchises and later titles in Konami's Pro Evolution Soccer series. Only the sixth and seventh installments of the series would be localized for a European release, with the former being endorsed by the British Isles' attheraces horse racing sports network. After Tecmo merged with Koei, the creator of rival horse racing series G1 Jockey, a crossover video game that incorporates mechanics from both G1 Jockey and Gallop Racer, Champion Jockey: G1 Jockey & Gallop Racer was released internationally in 2011 as the first and only game in this series to be available on non-Sony consoles and support the use of commercial motion controllers.

Year	Game	Regions			Platforms
Year	Game	JP	PAL	NA	Platforms
1996	Gallop Racer	Yes	Yes (Note: Only available on arcade.)	Yes	Arcade, PlayStation
1997	Gallop Racer 2: One and Only Road to Victory	Yes	Yes	Yes	Arcade, PlayStation
1999	Gallop Racer 3: One and Only Road to Victory	Yes	Yes	Yes (Note: The PlayStation version was renamed to Gallop Racer.)	Arcade, PlayStation
2000	Gallop Racer 2000	Yes	No	No	PlayStation
2001	Gallop Racer 2001	Yes (Note: Released as Gallop Racer 5.)	No	Yes	PlayStation 2
2002	Gallop Racer 2003: A New Breed	Yes (Note: Released as Gallop Racer 6: Revolution.)	Yes (Note: First Gallop Racer game released in Europe, titled attheraces presents Gallop Racer.)	Yes	PlayStation 2
2004	Gallop Racer 2004	Yes (Note: Released as Gallop Racer: Lucky 7.)	Yes (Note: Released as a sequel to attheraces presents Gallop Racer, titled Gallop Racer 2, in Europe.)	Yes	PlayStation 2
2005	Gallop Racer 2006	Yes (Note: Released as Gallop Racer 8: Live Horse Racing.)	No	Yes	PlayStation 2
2006	Gallop Racer Inbreed	Yes	No	No	PlayStation 2
2007	Gallop Racer Online	Yes (Note: Available from August 28, 2007 – March 31, 2009.)	No	No	Microsoft Windows
2011	Champion Jockey: G1 Jockey & Gallop Racer (Note: Crossover with Koei's G1 Jockey series.)	Yes	Yes	Yes (Note: Only available for PS3 and Wii.)	PlayStation 3, Wii, Xbox 360
2013	Gallop Racer (mobile) (Note: Available from December 18, 2013 – July 9, 2015.)	Yes	Yes	Yes	iOS, Android
2017	Champion Jockey Special	Yes	No	No	Nintendo Switch (Note: Updated Nintendo Switch version of Champion Jockey: G1 Jockey and Gallop Racer, released in 2017 only in Japan.)

== Reception ==
The games are bestsellers in Japan.
