= Kokology =

Kokoro study

Kokology is the study of kokoro (Japanese: 心) 'mind or spirit', introduced in the Kokology book series by Tadahiko Nagao and Isamu Saito, a professor at Rissho and Waseda Universities in Japan and an author of a number of bestselling books regarding psychology and relationships.

The main focus is the analysis of the deep psyche using theories from Freud and Jung. Kokology Questions typically are "guided" Day Dreams or Submodalities.

The books present a series of psychological and hypothetical questions that are designed to reveal one's hidden attitudes about sex, family, love, work, and other elements of one's life. It is essentially a game of self-discovery that can provide interesting, and often hilarious insight by answering questions to seemingly innocent topics. The books were published in 1998 in Japan and became a Japanese bestselling phenomenon. The books were translated and became available in the United States in 2000.

The television series ran on Saturdays it was only aired in one city broadcast time 22:00 to 22:54 (54 minutes)

- Series Run: April 20, 1991, to March 21, 1992
- Country: Japan Broadcasting
- Broadcast: Yomiuri Television Production Department
- Production: IVS TV Production
- Cast/s: Yamaguti Mie, Inferior soul, Izumiya Shigeru, Miwa Akihiro More

Video games were released based on the show by Sega and Tecmo.

== The Cube (game) ==
The Cube is a Kokology game about self knowledge and is played by asking a person to imagine and describe a set of three to five objects. The game is usually played by two people. One person is designated as the narrator, and the other is the interpreter. Usually these roles are swapped after successful interpretation. The Cube is a way of judging somebody's personality by the way they narrate the following.

While there are slight variations of the game from person to person, the game begins by asking another person to imagine a desert (or room) scene. The game then follows by asking the person to place and describe a cube in the scene. Once the cube is completely described, the narrator of the game then asks for the player to describe a ladder that is also placed in the scene. This process continues with foliage and/or flowers, a horse, and finally, a storm.

Once the narrator has an understanding of the scene described, he or she may assist the player in interpreting the scene.
