= Star Force =

1984 video game

- European arcade flyer
- Developer: Tehkan (Note: SG-1000 version developed by Sega; Famicom version developed by Hudson Soft.)
- Publishers: Tehkan: Arcade; WW: Tehkan; NA: Video Ware SG-1000 Sega Famicom/NES; JP: Hudson Soft; NA: Tecmo
- Platforms: Arcade, SG-1000, NES, MSX, X68000
- Release: September 1984: Arcade; JP: September 1984; NA: January 1986 SG-1000; JP: May 1985 NES; JP: June 25, 1985; NA: November 1987; PAL: April 27, 1990 MSX; JP: 1985 X68000; JP: March 26, 1993
- Genre: Scrolling shooter
- Modes: Single-player, multiplayer

Star Force (Note: Japanese: スターフォース, Hepburn: Sutā Fōsu), released in North America as Mega Force, is a 1984 vertically scrolling shooter video game developed and published by Tehkan for arcades. It was ported to the Famicom by Hudson Soft, with Tehkan's successor Tecmo releasing a different version for the Nintendo Entertainment System outside of Japan.

== Gameplay ==
Arcade version screenshot

In the game, the player pilots a starship called the Final Star, while shooting various enemies and destroying enemy structures for points.

Unlike later vertical scrolling shooters, like Toaplan's Twin Cobra, the Final Star had only two levels of weapon power and no secondary weapons like missiles and/or bombs. Each stage in the game was named after a letter of the Greek alphabet. In certain versions of the game, there is an additional level called "Infinity" (represented by the infinity symbol) which occurs after Omega, after which the game repeats indefinitely.

In the NES version, after defeating the Omega target, the player can see a black screen with Tecmo's logo, announcing the future release of the sequel Super Star Force. After that, the infinity target becomes available and the game repeats the same level and boss without increasing the difficulty.

== Reception ==
Reception

Review scores
Publication	Score
AllGame	1.5/5
Nintendo Life	5/10

In Japan, Game Machine listed Star Force as the fourteenth most successful table arcade unit of November 1984. In a retrospective assessment, Christopher Michael Baker of AllGame gave the NES version 1.5 out of 5 stars.

Reviewing the Arcade Archives release on the Nintendo Switch, Dave Frear of Nintendo Life gave the game a 5/10 score, noting it to be mediocre and unoriginal for its time.

== Legacy ==
=== Sequels ===
- Super Star Force: Jikūreki no Himitsu, released in 1986 for the Famicom.
- Final Star Force, released for arcades in 1992.

=== Ports and related releases ===
Star Force was ported and published in 1985 by Hudson Soft to both the MSX home computer and the Family Computer (Famicom) in Japan. Sales of the game were promoted through the first nationwide video game competition to be called "a caravan", although it was not the first event of its kind organized by Hudson (they had previously promoted Lode Runner with a similar event).

The North American and European versions for the Nintendo Entertainment System (NES) were published two years later, in 1987, with significant revisions, and with Tecmo credited rather than Hudson on the title screen and box art. According to Keiji Yamagishi, the NES version was created separately at Tecmo and is distinct from the port released for the Famicom by Hudson.

Star Force was also ported to the SG-1000 by Sega, and X68000 by Dempa Shimbunsha.

In 1995, along with two other NES shooters, the Famicom version of Star Force was remade by Hudson Soft with minimal upgrades for the Super Famicom as part of the Japan-only release of the Caravan Shooting Collection. The Famicom version was also included in Hudson's compilation of NES shooters in 2006 in Hudson Best Collection Vol. 5.

The original arcade version was later added to the compilation titled Tecmo Classic Arcade, which was released for the Xbox. In 2009, the arcade version was made available for download on the Wii's Virtual Console for 500 Wii Points as one of the four initial offerings for the "Virtual Console Arcade" category of the Wii Shop Channel (the other three being Gaplus, Mappy, and The Tower of Druaga from Namco).

In 1986, Hudson Soft released the shoot 'em up game Star Soldier, which is considered a spiritual successor to Star Force. The game spawned numerous sequels.

Hamster Corporation released the game as part of their Arcade Archives series for the PlayStation 4 in 2015 and Nintendo Switch in 2018.
