= Gallop Racer 2006 =

2005 video game by Tecmo

- Cover art
- Developer: Tecmo
- Publisher: Tecmo
- Series: Gallop Racer
- Platform: PlayStation 2
- Release: JP: December 15, 2005; NA: May 2, 2006
- Genre: Alternative sports (horse racing)
- Modes: Single-player, multiplayer

Gallop Racer 2006, known in Japan as Gallop Racer 8: Live Horse Racing (ギャロップレーサー8 ライヴホースレーシング, Gyaroppu Rēsā 8 Raivu Hōsu Rēshingu), is a horse racing video game developed and published by Tecmo, released in 2005-2006 for the PlayStation 2.

== Reception ==
Reception

Aggregate score
Aggregator	Score
Metacritic	69/100

Review scores
Publication	Score
Famitsu	30/40
Game Informer	6.75/10
GameSpot	5.8/10
GameSpy	2.5/5
GameZone	8.3/10
IGN	8.5/10
Official U.S. PlayStation Magazine	3.5/5
X-Play	3/5
Maxim	3/5

The game received "average" reviews according to the review aggregation website Metacritic. In Japan, Famitsu gave it a score of two eights and two sevens for a total of 30 out of 40.
