= Pleiades (video game) =

1981 video game

- Marquee of the licensed Centuri version
- Developer: Tehkan
- Publishers: JP/EU: Tehkan; NA: Centuri
- Platform: Arcade
- Release: JP: April 1981; NA: June 1981; EU: 1981
- Genre: Fixed shooter
- Mode: Single-player

Pleiades (プレアデス) is a 1981 fixed shooter video game developed and published by Tehkan for arcades; it was released by Centuri in North America. It is the first game to be developed by Tehkan, later known as Tecmo and Koei Tecmo. The name is shown on the title screen as Pleiads. The title comes from the mythical Greek Pleiades, the seven daughters of the titan Atlas.

== Gameplay ==
Pleiades is a multi-stage space shoot 'em up in which enemy ships fly at the player in waves in a similar fashion to games like Galaxian and Phoenix. Ships emerge from a mothership at the top of the screen and swoop downwards in a series of patterns which players must anticipate as they shoot the ships and avoid being obliterated by the Martian onslaught. There are four stages in the game. In the first stage the Earth space ship must defend the space station from Martian invaders who have the ability to transform from flying invaders, to walking invaders who build walls across the Earth city; these barriers must be destroyed. At the end of stage one the Earth space ship flies to the top of the screen to prepare to meet stage two. In the second stage the player encounters eight space monsters who must be hit directly on center to be destroyed before moving onto stage three. In this stage invaders emerge from a space ship at the top of the screen and swoop down on the player in sweeping attacks. In the final wave the player has to navigate through parked spaceships to dock on a landing pad as the screen scrolls downwards. Extra points can be gained in this stage by collecting flags as the player moves towards the landing corridor.

== Legacy ==
Pleiades is included in the Tecmo Hit Parade collection for the PlayStation 2 which includes seven classic arcade games from the publisher's past, as well as the eleven game compilation Tecmo Classic Arcade for the Xbox.

Pleiades appears in the 1983 horror film Nightmares, in the vignette "Bishop of Battle". Pleiads also has a cameo appearance in the 1984 Coen Brothers film Blood Simple.

== Records ==
Richie Knucklez holds the official Guinness World Record for this game with 279,090 points recorded on June 4, 2011, at the Annual Classic Video Game and Pinball Tournament at Funspot in Weirs Beach, New Hampshire.
