= List of video game soundtracks released on vinyl =

The practice of releasing video game soundtracks on vinyl records began in the 1980s, fell out of favor in the 1990s and 2000s as vinyl records were replaced by other storage media, and experienced a resurgence of interest in the 2010s due in part to a vinyl revival.

== History ==
Vinyl recordings of video game music find their origins in the 1970s with early experiments by Kraftwerk and albums such as Yellow Magic Orchestra's self-titled 1978 release sampling electronic music from the games Circus, Space Invaders, and Gun Fight. In 1984, Haruomi Hosono released the first generally recognized video game soundtrack album, Video Game Music, and the practice experienced its "golden age" in the mid-to-late 1980s with hundreds of releases including Buckner & Garcia's Pac-Man Fever, Namco's Video Game Graffiti, and Koichi Sugiyama's orchestral covers of the Dragon Quest series. The 1990s saw many fewer commercial releases and a shift to promo releases with increasing use of video game samples in rap and hip hop.

The trend away from vinyl discs continued in the 2000s as fan-made remixes also began to be produced, however by the 2010s the trend reversed and the practice of producing video game soundtracks on vinyl experienced a revival. The vinyl revival of the 2010s has itself been attributed to inspiration in younger music buyers from video games, and it has led to the establishment of video game soundtrack oriented vinyl record labels like Black Screen Records, Data Discs, Brave Wave, and iam8bit, and shifts toward similar releases for labels like Ghost Ramp, Ship To Shore Phonograph Co., and Mondo Tees. In a 2015 article, music journalist Mike Diver suggested that "this scene within a scene is experiencing boom times", however he noted that some in the music industry, including Invada manager Redg Weeks, were concerned by the risk of over-saturation of the market. These concerns were later repeated by Jamie Crook of Data Discs, and although he has joined Mondo's Mo Shafeek in arguing that the vinyl medium itself and the related revival is in no way a fad or bubble, in 2017 Kotaku reported concerns from dedicated video game soundtrack labels that pressing plants were scheduling their manufacturing runs last in order to favor traditional labels.

The 2000s–2010s revival of interest in this medium has been characterized by releases in limited numbers and promotional albums only available at special events or as pre-order bonuses. In addition, the practice has been adopted by the cult and Indie game scenes, with its proponents citing audio quality, interactivity, artwork, nostalgia, unique content, and the fact that vinyl albums represent tangible aspects of intangible (digitally distributed) products as key elements to what makes vinyl soundtrack albums attractive. Additional considerations for collectors include archival and preservation aspects for older games, examination and recontextualization of the music as a means to expand or further explore the game, and curiosity among audiophiles unfamiliar with video gaming music as a genre. Due to the limited nature of modern releases, many albums are considered highly collectible, with some regularly selling in excess of US$100. For Western collectors, additional difficulty is imposed by the cost of importing albums from Japan where the majority were produced during the "golden age" of the 1980s.

== Soundtrack albums ==
=== 1990s–2010 ===
Rel.	OST Title	Game title	Label	Notes	Ref(s)
1996	Wipeout 2097: The Soundtrack	Wipeout 2097	Virgin Records	2×LP on black vinyl.	
1997	Ghost In The Shell – PlayStation Soundtrack	Ghost in the Shell	Sony Music	2×LP on black vinyl.	
1997	PaRappa the Rapper	PaRappa the Rapper	Vacuum Records	Picture Disc LP with Vinyl Killer	
2001	Grand Theft Auto III Single	Grand Theft Auto III	Game Recordings	Album sampler. Side One: "Rising to the Top" Radio Version, Street Version and Instrumental. Side Two: "Spit Game" Radio Version, Street Version and Instrumental.	
2005	Chaos Theory – The Soundtrack To Tom Clancy's Splinter Cell: Chaos Theory	Tom Clancy's Splinter Cell: Chaos Theory	Ninja Tune	Composed by Amon Tobin.	
2009	Marvel vs. Capcom 2	Marvel vs. Capcom 2	Capcom	Limited release only available at Comic-Con 2009	
2009	Brütal Legend (Original Soundtrack)	Brütal Legend	Double Fine Productions	Composed by Peter McConnell.	
2009	Shatter – Official Videogame Soundtrack	Shatter	Mushroom Music NZ Ltd	On blue vinyl.	
2010	I Am Rapture, Rapture Is Me (Official BioShock Score)	BioShock	Take Two Interactive	Included with the Special Edition of BioShock 2	
2010	Machinarium Soundtrack	Machinarium	Minority Records	There are 5 pressings, the first pressing was limited to 555 printings, 150 of which are pressed on a clear yellow vinyl. All first pressings are signed by the cover artist and numbered.	
2010	Tron Evolution	Tron Evolution	iam8bit	This soundtrack was created by Sascha Dikiciyan. The soundtrack was pressed onto a picture disc resembling a Data Disk from Tron Legacy and limited to 200 copies.	
2010	Revolution Overdrive: Songs of Liberty	StarCraft II: Wings of Liberty	Blizzard Entertainment	Picture disc available originally only at Blizzcon 2010, and then released to other retailers.	
2010	Red Dead Redemption Original Soundtrack	Red Dead Redemption	Wax Poetics Records	Sold on the official Rockstar Games website. Limited to 1,000 copies on clear red vinyl.	
2010	W/F: Music From Final Fantasy XIII	Final Fantasy XIII	Square Enix	Limited release only available from the Japanese Square Enix e-store. Side A: "Nautlius", "Fang's Theme", "The Sunleth Waterscape", "Can't Catch a Break". Side B: "Chocobos of Pulse", "Dust to Dust", "Blinded By Light", "Ragnarok: Sans Pipe Organ" (exclusive)	
2010	W/F: Music From Final Fantasy XIII ~ Gentle Reveries	Final Fantasy XIII	Square Enix	Limited release only available from the Japanese Square Enix e-store. Side A: "Prelude to Final Fantasy XIII", "Saber's Edge", "Serah's Theme / Overseas Version", "Fighting Fate". Side B: "March of the Dreadnoughts", "Sulyya Springs", "The Yaschas Massif", "Will to Fight".	
2010	W/F: Music From Vana'diel	Final Fantasy XI	Square Enix	Limited release only available from the Japanese Square Enix e-store. Side A: "Ronafure", "Gustaberg", "Sarutabaruta", "Vana'diel March". Side B: "Autumn Footfalls", "Echoes of a Zephyr", "The Cosmic Wheel", "Vana'diel March #4".	

=== 2011–2014 ===
Rel.	OST Title	Game title	Label	Notes	Ref(s)
2011	Chaos Theory Remixed (The Soundtrack To Splinter Cell 3D)	Tom Clancy's Splinter Cell 3D	Ninja Tune	2×LP on black with 3D inner sleeve (glasses included).	
2011	Sword & Sworcery LP – The Ballad Of The Space Babies	Superbrothers: Sword & Sworcery EP	Dark Flute	180g on black vinyl with 13 bonus tracks.	
2011	Sounds of San Francisco	Driver: San Francisco	Ubisoft	Pressed on yellow vinyl. Sounds of San Francisco was included within the collector's edition of the PC and PlayStation 3 versions of Driver: San Francisco. Released for PAL region copies only.	
2011	Halo: Combat Evolved Anniversary	Halo: Combat Evolved Anniversary	Sumthing Else Music Works	Limited to 2000 copies. Pressed on green vinyl.	
2011	Myth: The Xenogears Orchestral Album	Xenogears	Square Enix	Includes 6 of the 14 tracks from the CD edition	
2012	The Music Of Retro City Rampage	Retro City Rampage	Lotus Audio	Limited to 500 copies – 100 blue, 100 yellow and 300 black. Hand-numbered.	
2012	Botanicula Soundtrack	Botanicula	Minority Records	Limited to 1000 copies. 300 pressed on turquoise vinyl, 300 pressed on amber vinyl, and the remaining 400 are pressed on black vinyl.	
2012	Awesomenauts	Awesomenauts	SonicPicnic	Distributed through the game's Kickstarter for pledging $250. On black vinyl, signed by the Awesomenauts team.	
2012	Halo 4 Original Soundtrack: Special Limited Edition	Halo 4	7 Hz Productions	180 Gram, 12" Master Chief picture disk vinyl of remixes included in Special Edition release of Halo 4 Soundtrack.	
2012	Kurohyo 2: Ryu ga Gotoku Asurahen Original Soundtrack	Kurohyō 2: Ryū ga Gotoku Ashura hen	Sega	Limited to 1000 copies.	
2013	Persona 4 Arena: Original Arrange Soundtrack	Persona 4 Arena	Atlus	Preorder bonus at GAME stores in the UK. Side A: "The Arena (Naked Mix)", "The Prince of Junes (Electro Mix)", "Like a Dragon (Girl Pop Mix)". Side B: "Princess Amagi (Traditional Taste Mix)", "The Wandering Wolf (Straight Mix)", "Missions for the Brilliant Executioner (2K Mix)".	
2013	Dropchord Soundtrack	Dropchord	Double Fine	On green vinyl with red splatter.	
2013	Dyad: Original Game Soundtrack	Dyad	Software	On black vinyl. LP contains notes and game instructions penned by composer David Kanaga.	
2014	Scott Pilgrim vs. The World: The Game Original Videogame Soundtrack	Scott Pilgrim vs. The World: The Game	ABKCO Records	Record Store Day 2014 exclusive. Limited to 2700 copies on yellow neon translucent vinyl.	
2014	Far Cry 3: Blood Dragon Soundtrack Vinyl	Far Cry 3: Blood Dragon	Ubisoft	Originally released on Record Store Day and limited to 1000 copies on clear pink vinyl worldwide. Due to popular demand, another printing was released in August 2014 and pressed on 140 gram black vinyl.	
2014	Watch Dogs Soundtrack Vinyl	Watch Dogs	Ubisoft	Limited blue splatter and black vinyl editions.	
2014	The Music of Grand Theft Auto V: Limited Edition LP Collection	GTA V	Mass Appeal	Limited to 5000 worldwide. 6×LP box set on blue, orange and pink vinyl. Includes 59 licensed songs from the game's soundtrack and the original score, full color booklet, and lithograph poster.	
2014	Halo 2 Anniversary Original Soundtrack	Halo 2	343 Industries/INgrooves	On black vinyl.	
2014	Hohokum Soundtrack	Hohokum	Ghostly International	160g rainbow-colored vinyl.	
2014	Killzone: Shadow Fall	Killzone: Shadow Fall	Ninja Tune	4LP gatefold release limited to 500 copies. Soundtrack by Lorn and Tyler Bates.	

=== 2015 ===
Rel.	OST Title	Game title	Label	Notes	Ref(s)
2015	The Order: 1886 Vinyl Soundtrack	The Order: 1886	Music On Vinyl	Limited to 500 copies of 180g gold-marbled vinyl.	
2015	Banjo-Kazooie Vinyl Soundtrack	Banjo-Kazooie	iam8bit	Limited edition of 3000 copies on 180g brown and red vinyl.	
2015	Battletoads Vinyl Soundtrack	Battletoads	iam8bit	Limited edition of 3000 copies on 180g green swirl vinyl.	
2015	The Last of Us Original Soundtrack	The Last of Us	Mondo	4×LP in heavy duty slip case containing the score from The Last of Us and The Last of Us: Left Behind.	
2015	Hotline Miami 2: Wrong Number – Collector's Edition	Hotline Miami 2: Wrong Number	iam8bit	3×LP set only available as part of collector's edition	
2015	Mother	Mother	Ship to Shore PhonoCo.	2×LP soundtrack to Famicom RPG (titled EarthBound Beginnings in the U.S.). Available in 3 editions – Classic Black limited to 1000 copies, Translucent Red limited to 500 copies, and White limited to 500 copies. Housed in a gatefold jacket with a traditional Japanese OBI strip.	
2015	Journey Vinyl Soundtrack	Journey	iam8bit	2×LP picture disc set.	
2015	Mega Man: Best of Mega Man 1 – 10 Picture Disc LP	Mega Man	SPACELAB9	Limited edition, created exclusively for Hot Topic. Reissued in January 2016 in 3 different deluxe "Mega Pack" editions on splatter vinyl.	
2015	Super Hexagon EP	Super Hexagon	iam8bit	Limited edition of 1600, 400 each of four different colors – red, blue, purple and black – on hexagon shaped vinyl.	
2015	BIT.TRIP's Greatest Chips	BIT.TRIP	iam8bit	Limited edition of 1500 on a picture disc rainbow vinyl. Also includes downloads for all seven titles in BIT.TRIP series.	
2015	Persona 4: Dancing All Night Original Soundtrack -REMIXES-	Persona 4: Dancing All Night	Mastard Records	Released by Atlus at Comiket 88.	
2015	Everybody's Gone to the Rapture Original Soundtrack	Everybody's Gone to the Rapture	Music on Vinyl	2×LP on black vinyl. A limited edition of 500 white vinyl copies were released at launch.	
2015	Perfect Dark Vinyl Soundtrack	Perfect Dark	iam8bit	Limited edition of 3000 copies on 180g red and blue splattered vinyl.	
2015	Streets of Rage Original Soundtrack	Streets of Rage	Data Discs	DATA 001 entry in their video game soundtrack series. Released on black and translucent red vinyl.	
2015	Shenmue Original Soundtrack	Shenmue	Data Discs	DATA 002 entry in their video game soundtrack series. Released on black and translucent blue vinyl.	
2015	Shinobi III Original Soundtrack	Shinobi III: Return of the Ninja Master	Data Discs	DATA 003 entry in their video game soundtrack series. Released on black and oxblood vinyl.	
2015	Super Hang-On Original Soundtrack	Super Hang-On	Data Discs	DATA 004 entry in their video game soundtrack series. Released as a 12" 45 on black and clear vinyl with blue, white and red tri-colour splatter.	
2015	Fallout 3 Original Game Soundtrack	Fallout 3	Spacelab9	Hot Topic exclusive picture disc featuring 14 tracks from the score.	
2015	Fallout 3: Special Edition Vinyl Soundtrack	Fallout 3	Spacelab9	Bethesda Store exclusive 3×LP and one 7" box set, limited to 2500 copies. Contains the full score of over 80 minutes by Inon Zur. Pressed on blue vinyl.	
2015	Minecraft Volume Alpha	Minecraft	Ghostly International	Available in two pressings – a 1000-copy, limited edition transparent green with lenticular-printed jacket and standard black.	
2015	Far Cry 4: Original Game Soundtrack	Far Cry 4	Invada	3×LP on solid orange, solid blue and solid green vinyl. Released in the UK and limited 1500 copies. Music by Cliff Martinez.	
2015	New 'N' Tasty! Oddworld: Abe's Oddysee	Oddworld: New 'n' Tasty!	Black Screen Records	Available in two editions – limited edition green 180g and black 180g. Soundtrack includes Steam code for Oddworld: New 'N' Tasty game, and MP3 downloads for New 'N' Tasty and Oddworld: Abe's Odyssey.	
2015	Halo 5: Guardians Original Soundtrack	Halo 5: Guardians	343 Industries	Available in 3 editions – 2LP black vinyl, 2LP clear vinyl (Hastings Entertainment exclusive, limited to 1000 copies), and a limited edition box set version with 2LP black vinyl, 2CD, Blu-ray, and sheet music.	
2015	FEZ	FEZ	Polytron Corporation	2LP orange translucent vinyl.	
2015	Superbeat Xonic: The X-Otic Limited Edition	Superbeat: Xonic	PM Studios (NA) / Rising Star Games (EU)	The "X-Otic Limited Edition" of the game includes the soundtrack on 2LP black vinyl and 2CD. 450 copies were made for North America and 500 for Europe.	

=== 2016 ===
Rel.	OST Title	Game title	Label	Notes	Ref(s)
2016	Axiom Verge	Axiom Verge	Ship To Shore PhonoCo.	LP limited to 1000 copies (250 on orange translucent with red swirl and 750 on purple marble).	
2016	Mother 2	Mother 2	Ship to Shore PhonoCo.	2×LP available in 5 editions – Classic Black, Red/Black swirl, Hot Pink, Blue/Yellow split, and Mach Pizza Variant. Housed in a gatefold jacket with a traditional Japanese OBI strip.	
2016	FTL: Faster Than Light Vinyl Soundtrack	FTL: Faster Than Light	iam8bit	2×LP on cosmic swirl made to look like a galaxy.	
2016	Uncharted: The Nathan Drake Collection Vinyl Soundtrack	Uncharted: The Nathan Drake Collection	iam8bit	3×LP box set including soundtracks from Uncharted: Drake's Fortune, Uncharted 2: Among Thieves, and Uncharted 3: Drake's Deception. On green, blue, and tan vinyl.	
2016	Fastfall: Dustforce Vinyl Soundtrack	Dustforce	iam8bit	Limited edition of 1000. 150g tan 'dust' vinyl. Includes download code for game.	
2016	Guild Wars 2: Heart of Thorns Vinyl Soundtrack	Guild Wars 2: Heart of Thorns	iam8bit	2×LP on green splatter vinyl.	
2016	Monument Valley Vinyl Soundtrack	Monument Valley	iam8bit	2×LP on blue and white vinyl.	
2016	The Banner Saga Vinyl Soundtrack	The Banner Saga	iam8bit	2×LP on red and beige vinyl. Music by Austin Wintory.	
2016	XCOM Vinyl Soundtrack	XCOM: Enemy Unknown and XCOM 2	iam8bit	2×LP on blue vinyl containing the soundtracks to both XCOM: Enemy Unknown and XCOM 2.	
2016	Streets of Rage 2 Original Soundtrack	Streets of Rage 2	Data Discs	DATA 005 entry in their video game soundtrack series. 2×LP with four bonus tracks and two lithograph prints. Available in three colors: classic black, smoke, white with blood splatter.	
2016	No Man's Sky Vinyl Soundtrack	No Man's Sky	iam8bit	2×LP on sky blue and red vinyl. Music by 65daysofstatic.	
2016	FTL: Advanced Edition Vinyl Soundtrack	FTL: Faster Than Light	iam8bit	180g vinyl, limited to 1000 copies. Contained all the music added to FTL in the Advanced Edition update and one bonus track by composer Ben Prunty.	
2016	Quantum Break Vinyl Soundtrack	Quantum Break	iam8bit	Single LP, 180g grey splatter on white vinyl. Limited to 3000 copies.	
2016	Ratchet & Clank Vinyl Soundtrack	Ratchet & Clank	iam8bit	180g orange vinyl LP.	
2016	No Man's Sky: Music For An Infinite Universe	No Man's Sky	Laced Records	Available in two editions – Deluxe 4×LP box set and a standard 2×LP version. Deluxe set includes the 10-track OST as well as six soundscapes. Standard includes 10-track OST. Music by 65daysofstatic.	
2016	The Banner Saga 2 Vinyl Soundtrack	The Banner Saga 2	iam8bit	2×LP on black and beige vinyl. Music by Austin Wintory.	
2016	Mafia III Original Score	Mafia III	2K Games	2×LP. Disc One will contain songs from the 1960s setting of the game. Disc 2 will contain the original score to the game. Will be available on vinyl in the Mafia III Collector's Edition.	
2016	Out Run Original Soundtrack	Out Run	Data Discs	30th anniversary release on 180g vinyl, available in three editions: tri-color mint green, clear and pink; mint green; and classic black. Contains tracks from the original arcade release, the 1991 Mega Drive version, and the 2014 Nintendo 3DS version.	
2016	Panzer Dragoon Original Soundtrack	Panzer Dragoon	Data Discs		
2016	Street Fighter II The Definitive Soundtrack	Street Fighter II: The World Warrior, Super Street Fighter II: The New Challengers, Super Street Fighter II Turbo	Brave Wave Productions	4-LP box set containing remastered CPS-1 and CPS-2 soundtracks on blue and orange vinyl. Also includes a booklet with essays and an interview with composer Yoko Shimomura.	
2016	Uncharted 4 Vinyl Soundtrack	Uncharted 4: A Thief's End	iam8bit	2×LP. Available in two versions – a brown and green marble standard edition and an Avery Coin picture disc limited edition of 500 copies.	
2016	Framed Vinyl Soundtrack	Framed (video game)	iam8bit	180g LP on red marble vinyl.	
2016	Oxenfree Vinyl Soundtrack	Oxenfree	iam8bit	2×LP on 180g grey and purple vinyl.	
2016	Furi Original Soundtrack	Furi	G4F Records	2×LP on blue and pink vinyl. Limited to 800 copies.	
2016	Fallout 4: Deluxe Vinyl Soundtrack	Fallout 4	SPACELAB9	6-LP box set on blue vinyl containing the full score by Inon Zur. Also available as a 1×LP picture disc.	
2016	Hotline Miami: Collector's Edition Vinyl	Hotline Miami	Laced Records	3×LP on black, red, and green 180g vinyl. Limited to 5000 copies.	
2016	Thumper Collector's Edition Vinyl	Thumper	iam8bit	Specially designed 180g LP with music by Brian Gibson and artwork by Robert Beatty.	
2016	Killer Cuts Vinyl Soundtrack	Killer Instinct	iam8bit	180g LP available in three editions – Purple vinyl with Sabrewulf cover, clear vinyl with Spinal cover, and green vinyl with Fulgore cover (EVO exclusive with metallic cover).	
2016	Rocket League Vinyl Soundtrack	Rocket League	iam8bit	3×LP available in two editions – a limited edition pressed on pictures discs with different wheel designs and a standard edition pressed on grey, purple, and pink vinyl.	
2016	Castlevania	Castlevania	Mondo	10" available in two editions – an SDCC exclusive half red/half grey split colored version and a standard edition on grey splatter vinyl.	
2016	LISA	LISA	Ghost Ramp	2×LP available in three editions – a picture disc version, a red/black and blue/black split colored version, and a special edition picture disc version that also includes an enamel pin and an embroidered patch.	
2016	Downwell Official Video Game Soundtrack	Downwell	Black Screen Records	180g LP on red vinyl – exclusive cover art by Mushbuh. Includes an MP3 download code and a 12" screen print by nemk.	
2016	Golden Axe I & II	Golden Axe I, Golden Axe II	Data Discs	LP in three different color variants – limited edition gold translucent with purple swatches, gold translucent, and classic black vinyl.	
2016	Undertale Vinyl Soundtrack	Undertale	iam8bit	2×LP with one disc on blue vinyl and one on red vinyl. Comes in a gatefold jacket with new artwork by Drew Wise.	
2016	Psychonauts Vinyl Soundtrack	Psychonauts	iam8bit	Single LP with game and soundtrack download. Artwork by Lunar Saloon.	
2016	Broken Age Vinyl Soundtrack	Broken Age	iam8bit	2×LP with game and soundtrack download. Artwork by Nathan "Bagel" Stapley.	
2016	Risk of Rain Official Video Game Soundtrack	Risk of Rain	Black Screen Records	2×LP release with one LP on purple and the other on gold colored vinyl.	
2016	The Warrior EP	Shadow Warrior 2	Laced Records	12" EP with a screen-printed b-side. Available on both black and gold-colored vinyl. Features music by Stan Bush.	
2016	Best of Batman: Arkham Knight	Batman: Arkham Knight	Enjoy The Ride Records	LP containing a selection of songs from the Batman: Arkham Knight soundtrack curated by composer Nick Arundel. Comes in 3 different 140g color variants – black and silver merge, maroon with blue splatter, and red and blue merge.	
2016	Pony Island Official Video Game Soundtrack	Pony Island	Black Screen Records	LP in two different 180g variants – clear vinyl and black vinyl.	
2016	Firewatch Original Score	Firewatch	Campo Santo	Black vinyl LP	
2016	Mass Effect Trilogy Vinyl Soundtrack	Mass Effect, Mass Effect 2 and Mass Effect 3	Electronic Arts Music	4×LP box set featuring music from Mass Effect 1–3 as well as an LP with unused tracks from the series.	
2016	Driveclub Original Soundtrack	Driveclub	Sony Interactive Entertainment	2×LP release on red vinyl	

=== 2017 ===
Rel.	OST Title	Game title	Label	Notes	Ref(s)
2017	Call of Duty: Infinite Warfare Vinyl Soundtrack	Call of Duty: Infinite Warfare	iam8bit	2×LP picture disc vinyl.	
2017	Ori and the Blind Forest Vinyl Soundtrack	Ori and the Blind Forest	iam8bit	2×LP available in two editions: a limited edition of 500 copies on glow-in-the-dark vinyl changing from white to blue, and a standard edition on blue and purple vinyl.	
2017	Hyper Light Drifter Vinyl Soundtrack	Hyper Light Drifter	iam8bit	4×LP on 180g pink, blue, green and purple vinyl. Music by Disasterpeace.	
2017	Rez Infinite	Rez Infinite	iam8bit	2×LP + 7" set in two variants – one is on orange translucent and orange opaque vinyl with a grey/black marbled 7", the other is a picture disc set limited to 1000 copies. The release comes in a special 48-page book designed by Cory Schmitz and written by Nick Hurwitch.	
2017	Castlevania II: Simon's Quest	Castlevania II: Simon's Quest	Mondo	10" record featuring the NES and Famicom versions of the soundtrack.	
2017	Nuclear Throne	Nuclear Throne	Ghost Ramp	2×LP with one record on green vinyl and the other a picture disc.	
2017	Sunset Riders EP	Sunset Riders	iam8bit	10" on clear gray colored vinyl.	
2017	The Revenge Of Shinobi	The Revenge of Shinobi	Data Discs	LP featuring a fully remastered version of the soundtrack. Comes on classic black vinyl, bone white vinyl, and limited edition bone white with black splatter vinyl.	
2017	Abzû Vinyl Soundtrack	Abzû	iam8bit	2×LP on blue vinyl. Early preorder copies comes with a bioluminescent cover.	
2017	Ninja Gaiden The Definitive Soundtrack Vol. 1	Ninja Gaiden (NES video game) and Ninja Gaiden (arcade game)	Brave Wave Productions	Vinyl release of the NES and arcade soundtracks from the original Ninja Gaiden	
2017	Ninja Gaiden The Definitive Soundtrack Vol. 2	Ninja Gaiden II: The Dark Sword of Chaos and Ninja Gaiden III: The Ancient Ship of Doom	Brave Wave Productions	Vinyl release of the soundtracks to Ninja Gaiden II and III.	
2017	Bound Vinyl Soundtrack	Bound	iam8bit	LP on sky blue colored vinyl.	
2017	The Last Guardian Vinyl Soundtrack	The Last Guardian	iam8bit	2×LP release on black and white marbled vinyl. Comes in a triple gatefold cover.	
2017	Deus Ex: Human Revolution	Deus Ex: Human Revolution	Sumthing Else Music Works	2×LP on bronze translucent vinyl with black swirls.	
2017	Crypt Of The NecroDancer	Crypt of the NecroDancer	Ghost Ramp	2×LP with one record on red/orange "fire" colored vinyl and triple blue "ice" colored vinyl.	
2017	FlOw Vinyl Soundtrack	flOw	iam8bit	LP on blue vinyl.	
2017	Flower Vinyl Soundtrack	Flower	iam8bit	2×LP on white and blue vinyl.	
2017	Runbow Original Soundtrack	Runbow	iam8bit	2-LP set on pink and blue marbled vinyl. Limited to 2000 copies.	
2017	#Breakforcist Original Soundtrack	#Breakforcist	The Yetee	7" on white vinyl featuring a selection of 4 songs from the game's soundtrack.	
2017	Fight Songs: The Music of Team Fortress 2	Team Fortress 2	Ipecac Recordings	2×LP on blue and red vinyl.	
2017	Planet Coaster Soundtrack	Planet Coaster	iam8bit	2×LP on blue and red vinyl.	
2017	Warframe Vinyl Soundtrack	Warframe	iam8bit	2×LP on oxblood vinyl.	
2017	Castlevania III: Dracula's Curse Original Video Game Soundtrack	Castlevania III: Dracula's Curse	Mondo	2×LP in a cover with art by Sachin Teng. Two versions available – orange with black & grey splatter and black/brown split + blue/red split.	
2017	Strafe: Deluxe Double Vinyl	Strafe	Laced Records	2×LP with art by Pixel Titans and Joey Rex. Two versions available – standard edition with orange & red vinyl and special edition black vinyl with floppy disc inspired cover art limited to 300 copies.	
2017	Yooka Laylee; Deluxe Double Vinyl	Yooka Laylee	Laced Records	2×LP on purple & green vinyl	
2017	Cuphead Vinyl Soundtrack	Cuphead	iam8bit	4×LP on black vinyl with art by Jango Snow. Custom 1930s-style folio packaging.	
2017	The Witcher 3: Wild Hunt Original Soundtrack	The Witcher 3: Wild Hunt	spacelab9	thinkgeek.com exclusive 2×LP on grey vinyl	
2017	Dark Souls Vinyl Trilogy	Dark Souls, Dark Souls II, and Dark Souls III	Bandai Namco Entertainment	9×LP box set. Limited to 2000 copies.	
2017	Portal Original Video Game Soundtrack LP	Portal	Mondo	2×LP on grey and white vinyl	
2017	Stardew Valley 2LP Vinyl Record	Stardew Valley	Gamer's Edition	2×LP on tri-coloured vinyl	
2017	Halo Wars 2 Original Game Soundtrack	Halo Wars 2	Sumthing Else Music	2×LP on red marble vinyl	

=== 2018 ===
Rel.	OST Title	Game title	Composer(s)	Label	Notes	Ref(s)
2018	Rocket Knight Adventures	Rocket Knight Adventures	Aki Hata	Ship to Shore PhonoCo.	Rocket Flash orange/yellow splatter vinyl	
2018	Celeste Original Soundtrack	Celeste	Lena Raine	Ship to Shore PhonoCo.	2×LP, Two versions available – standard edition with crystal clear vinyl and special edition with pink & purple vinyl	
2018	Moss (Original Game Soundtrack)	Moss	Jason Graves	Materia Collective	180 single LP	
2018	Hero of Time Soundtrack	The Legend of Zelda: Ocarina of Time	Koji Kondo	iam8bit	2×LP Purple and Green Vinyl	
2018	Shadow of the Colossus Soundtrack	Shadow of the Colossus and Shadow of the Colossus (2018)	Kow Otani	iam8bit	2×LP Translucent Vinyl	
2018	Runescape: Original Soundtrack Classics	RuneScape and Old School RuneScape	Ian Taylor	Laced records	2× 180g Red Vinyl	
2018	Hollow Knight Original Soundtrack	Hollow Knight	Christopher Larkin	Ghost Ramp	2×LP Vinyl, Album, Picture Disc; Limited Edition	
2018	Okami	Ōkami	Various	Data Discs	4× LP on clear vinyl with a pink and white splatter.	
2018	Streets of Rage 3	Streets of Rage 3	Yuzo Koshiro Motohiro Kawashima	Data Discs	2× LP on Translucent Orange Vinyl with "Black Smoke". Other variants also exist.	

=== 2019 ===
Rel.	OST Title	Game title	Composer(s)	Label	Notes	Ref(s)
2019	Rend Original Soundtrack	Rend	Neal Acree	Materia Collective	2×LP Rune blue hand-poured color mix, two-pocked gatefold jacket	
2019	The Banner Saga 3 Soundtrack	The Banner Saga 3	Austin Wintory	iam8bit	2×LP Black and Teal Vinyl	
2019	Doki Doki Literature Club! Soundtrack	Doki Doki Literature Club!	Dan Salvato	iam8bit	Crimson Smoke Vinyl	
2019	Grim Fandango Remastered Soundtrack	Grim Fandango	Peter McConnell	iam8bit	2×LP Black Vinyl; 20th anniversary release	
2019	Deltarune, Chapter 1	Deltarune	Toby Fox	Materia Collective	1×LP green marble vinyl; includes printed inner sleeves with artwork	
2019	Silent Hill 2 (Original Video Game Soundtrack)	Silent Hill 2	Akira Yamaoka	Mondo	2× LP that has many different coloured vinyl variants, and a black vinyl release. The composer is uncredited on this release and is not mentioned anywhere on the labels or cover art.	

=== 2020 ===
Rel.	OST Title	Game title	Composer(s)	Label	Notes	Ref(s)
2020	CrossCode Original Game Soundtrack	CrossCode	Deniz Akbulut	Materia Collective	2×LP vinyl with pink and blue color-in-color discs, glow-in-the-dark gatefold jacket, and custom die cut	
2020	Ori and the Will of the Wisps (Original Soundtrack)	Ori and the Will of the Wisps	Gareth Coker	Iam8bit	2xLP 180-gram Black Audiophile Vinyl, Foil Embellished Wide Spine Jacket	
2020	Risk of Rain 2 Original Soundtrack	Risk of Rain 2	Chris Christodoulou	Black Screen Records	3×LP black vinyl, 3×LP limited edition manually pressed ink-spot vinyl	
2020	Vib-Ribbon	Vib-Ribbon	Masaya Matsuura Laugh & Peace	Minimum Records	45 RPM White Vinyl LP	

=== 2021–2024 ===
Rel.	OST Title	Game title	Composer(s)	Label	Notes	Ref(s)
2021	Final Fantasy XIV Vinyl LP Box	Final Fantasy XIV	Masayoshi Soken	Square Enix Music	Box set with 4×LP black vinyl	
2021	Persona 5 Royal	Persona 5 Royal	Various	Iam8bit	3× LP Box set on Gold Nugget, Translucent Red, and Translucent Black Vinyl.	
2021	Super Monkey Ball Banana Mania	Super Monkey Ball Banana Mania	Various	Iam8bit	2× LP on yellow vinyl.	
2022	Spiritfarer Original Soundtrack	Spiritfarer	Max LL	Iam8bit	2× LP on star hat green vinyl	
2022	Deltarune, Chapter 2	Deltarune	Toby Fox	Materia Collective	2×LP light-blue marble and red marble color vinyl; includes printed inner sleeves with artwork; Side D features the etched "Dance of Dog" with a zoetrope animation effect.	
2023	Yume Nikki Official Soundtrack	Yume Nikki	Kikiyama	Fangamer	2×LP pink and purple swirl-colored vinyl; housed in a gatefold jacket with printed sleeves featuring artwork	
2024	Shin Megami Tensei V Vinyl Soundtrack Box Set	Shin Megami Tensei V	Ryota Kozuka Toshiki Konishi	Fangamer	5×LP box set vinyl	

=== 2025 ===
Rel.	OST Title	Game title	Composer(s)	Label	Notes	Ref(s)
2025	ASTRO BOT (Original Soundtrack)	Astro Bot	Kenneth C. M. Young	Fangamer	2×LP white vinyl record set	
2025	OMORI (Original Game Soundtrack)	Omori	Pedro Silva; Jami Lynne; Calum Bowen	Omocat	2×LP clear + black and white "tie-dye" swirl-colored vinyl record set	

=== 2026 ===
Rel.	OST Title	Game title	Composer(s)	Label	Notes	Ref(s)
2026	Crow Country Vinyl Soundtrack	Crow Country	Ockeroid	Fangamer	On red vinyl	
2026	Clair Obscur: Expedition 33 (Original Soundtrack)	Clair Obscur: Expedition 33	Lorien Testard	Laced Records	2×LP black vinyl record set	

== Soundtrack compilations ==
Rel.	OST Title	Game titles	Label	Notes	Ref(s)
1984	Video Game Music	Xevious, Bosconian, Pac-Man, Phozon, Mappy, Libble Rabble, Pole Position, New Rally-X, Dig Dug, Galaga	Yen Records	–	
1986	Hudson Game Music	Star Soldier, Nuts & Milk, Binary Land, Bomberman, Raid on Bungeling Bay, Championship Lode Runner, Challenger	Alfa Records	–	
1986	Sega Game Music Vol. 1	Out Run, Space Harrier, Alex Kidd in Miracle World	Alfa Records	–	
2009	Sega Mega Drive Ultimate Collection	Space Harrier, Ristar, Vectorman, Golden Axe, Phantasy Star II, Vectorman 2	Sega	–	
2010	Pimania: The Music of Mel Croucher & Automata U.K., Ltd.	Pimania, other Automata UK games	Feeding Tube Records	Limited release of 500 copies. Music by Mel Croucher	
2011	Dreamcast Collection	Sonic Adventure, Space Channel 5: Part 2, Crazy Taxi	Sega	Preorder bonus at stores in Australia.	
2012	Final Fantasy Vinyls	Final Fantasy I, Final Fantasy II, Final Fantasy III, Final Fantasy IV, Final Fantasy V, Final Fantasy VI, Final Fantasy VII, Final Fantasy VIII, Final Fantasy IX, Final Fantasy X	Square Enix	Composed by Nobuo Uematsu. 5-disc collection. Only released in Japan.	
2012	Final Fantasy Orchestral Album	Final Fantasy I, Final Fantasy II, Final Fantasy III, Final Fantasy V, Final Fantasy VI, Final Fantasy VIII, Final Fantasy X	Square Enix	Single disc released as part of the special edition Orchestral Album set. Only available in Japan. Side A: "Medley 2002" (Final Fantasy I–III), "Eyes on Me" ft. Crystal Kay (Final Fantasy VIII), "Zanarkand" (Final Fantasy X). Side B: "Opera" (Final Fantasy VI), "Dear Friends" (Final Fantasy V).	
2015	Humble Indie Bundle 12	The Bridge, SteamWorld Dig, Luftrausers, Race the Sun, Hammerwatch, Monaco: What's Yours Is Mine, Gone Home, Gunpoint, Prison Architect	Humble Bundle	Released as part of the $65 tier of Humble Indie Bundle 12.	
2016	Guilty Gear Sound Live 2014 Archives	Guilty Gear X, Guilty Gear 2: Overture, Guilty Gear Xrd (-SIGN- & -REVELATOR-)	Rice Digital	Available in the Guilty Gear Xrd -REVELATOR- Let's Rock! Edition, only available in the UK. Includes 2×LP on red vinyl featuring tracks from a live performance of music from the Guilty Gear game series.	
2016	Assassin's Creed: The Best of Jesper Kyd	Assassin's Creed, Assassin's Creed 2, Assassin's Creed: Brotherhood, Assassin's Creed: Revelations	SPACELAB9	180g LP picture disc featuring music selections from several Assassin's Creed titles composed by Jesper Kyd.	
2022	Overcooked! The Kingdom Tour	Overcooked, Overcooked 2	Demon Records	Contains music from the first Overcooked game and Overcooked 2; however, most tracks on the album are from Overcooked 2.	

== Soundtrack singles ==
Rel.	OST title	Game title	Label	Notes	Ref(s)
1995	Windermere – The Jungle Mixes	Tekken	JVC	–	
2001	"Say I Gotta Believe"	PaRappa the Rapper 2	PlayStation	7” Picture Disc which contains the same song on both sides of the record.	
2004	"Doom 3 Theme Song"	Doom 3	–	–	
2016	Drift Stage	Drift Stage	Ghost Ramp	–	
2016	"Annoying Dog Song"	Undertale	iam8bit	Bonus 7" included with early preorders for the Undertale 2×LP release	
2017	Death Stranding	Death Stranding	Mondo	12" with the Low Roar songs used in trailers for the game.	

== Vinyl data ==
Instead of direct sound recording, sequencer or other data can be encoded and stored on vinyl media. This process did not receive widespread acceptance.

== See also ==
- List of video game soundtracks released on CD
