= Ninja Gaiden (1991 video game) =

There are several video games in the Ninja Gaiden franchise that were released in 1991.

- Ninja Gaiden (arcade game) had a version re-released in 1991 for DOS
- Ninja Gaiden (NES video game) was released in 1991 in Europe for NES
  - Its sequel Ninja Gaiden II: The Dark Sword of Chaos was released in 1991 for MS-DOS and Amiga
  - Its second sequel Ninja Gaiden III: The Ancient Ship of Doom was released in 1991 for NES
- Ninja Gaiden (Game Gear) was released in 1991 for Game Gear
- Ninja Gaiden Shadow was released in 1991 in Japan and North America for Game Boy
