= My Name Is Uncle Groucho, You Win a Fat Cigar =

1983 video game

- Developer: Automata UK
- Publisher: Automata UK
- Designers: Mel Croucher; Christian Penfold
- Platform: ZX Spectrum
- Release: 1983
- Mode: Single-player

My Name Is Uncle Groucho, You Win a Fat Cigar is a computer game developed and published by Automata UK for the ZX Spectrum in 1983. Groucho was designed by Mel Croucher who was better known for his later works Deus Ex Machina and ID.

The game takes the form of a text adventure, augmented by primitive graphics, where the player seeks out Groucho (based on Groucho Marx), who gives the player a series of clues as to the identity of a famous film star. If the player guesses correctly another clue to a further star is provided. The name of this additional star could be mailed to Automata UK for entry into a prize draw to take place on 1 June 1984. The first prize was a trip to Hollywood on Concorde to meet the actor identified, with a return trip on the QE2.

The competition was won by Phil Daley, who correctly identified Mickey Mouse and provided the winning pun slogan "There's no blood in our games, it's all tomata sauce".
