= Computer Shopper =

Computer Shopper may refer to the following publications:

- Computer Shopper (British magazine), 1988–2020
- Computer Shopper (American magazine), 1979–2009
