= Pimania =

1982 video game

- Developer: Mel Croucher
- Publisher: Automata UK
- Platforms: BBC Micro, ZX Spectrum, Dragon 32, ZX81
- Release: October 1982
- Genre: Adventure

Pimania is a text-and-graphics adventure game written by Mel Croucher and released by Automata UK in 1982 for the BBC Micro, ZX Spectrum, Dragon 32, and ZX81. It was the first real-life video game treasure hunt to be released. It was inspired by the 1979 Kit Williams book Masquerade. Automata gave a prize of a golden sundial worth £6,000 (equivalent to £21,400 in 2025) for the first person to solve the various cryptic clues to its location that were hidden within Pimania.

== Gameplay ==
ZX81 intro screen

The player negotiates a surreal landscape with the aid of the mysterious Pi-Man, Automata's mascot. The B-side of the game cassette features a bizarre Pimania song played on a VL-Tone and vocals. The Pi-Man also starred in his own long-running, surreal, comic-strip, soap opera in the company's adverts on the back page of Popular Computing Weekly magazine and appeared in several subsequent games by the company of different types, such as Piromania and Piballed.

The sundial was eventually won in 1985 by Sue Cooper and Lizi Newman, who correctly worked out that it could only be found on 22 July (because π is sometimes rounded to 22/7) at the Litlington White Horse on Hindover Hill near Litlington, East Sussex.

== Legacy ==
The BASIC source code listing of the game is available online.

In 2010 Feeding Tube Records, a small label in the United States, released "Pimania: The Music of Mel Croucher & Automata U.K., Ltd.", a deluxe vinyl LP album of the musical B-Sides to the Pimania games, as well as tracks from other Automata releases. The album came with extensive liner notes by Croucher and Caroline Bren, as well as a large poster featuring selections from the original Automata print campaigns and was issued in a one time edition of 500 copies.
