= ID (video game) =

1986 video game

iD
- Publisher: CRL
- Designers: Clement Chambers, Mel Croucher, Colin Jones
- Platform: ZX Spectrum
- Release: UK: 1986
- Genre: Puzzle
- Mode: Single player

iD is a 1986 puzzle video game featuring an early form of artificial intelligence. The game is text-based and takes the form of a conversation with an entity that has inhabited the computer. The player's task is to gain the entity's trust and find out what other inanimate objects this entity has inhabited in the past.

== Development ==
Clement Chambers, managing director of CRL, signed Mel Croucher and Colin Jones to develop iD after seeing Darkness at Dawn, an adventure game for the Commodore 64 that featured no graphics or text and could be played by ear..

While the initial concept for iD came from Chambers it was developed further by Croucher and Jones who worked together on both the game's text and code. It was the first release to involve Croucher since leaving Automata on 1st April 1985 and the first release on CRL's Nu Wave label, created for publishing more unusual games.

CRL promoted the game with a competition in Crash magazine. The first prize was a Canon Sprint Camera and a copy of Stewart Cowley's 1985 book, Advanced Do-it-yourself Brain Surgery.

== Reception ==
iD sold around 500 copies. It appeared Swansea's Microstore top ten chart published in March 1986 for two weeks running.

== Legacy ==
Darkness at Dawn, which would have included George Harrison's "Beware of Darkness" on the soundtrack, was never released.. The next release from Nu Wave was a title based on Tubular Bells for the Commodore 64 which displayed dots and lights while the music played.. The label also released the MSX version of Deus Ex Machina. A distribution deal between CRL and Electronic Arts led to Nu Wave publishing a Commodore 64 version of 1983's Worms? under the title IQ. The deal ended in an acrimonious legal dispute which led to the closure of CRL.

In 2011, Chambers told Retro Gamer magazine that he was still proud of iD: "Some people class this game as one of the all-time greats, and I've been personally thanked for it even 20 years later. That still gives me a real buzz."
