= Automonopoli =

Unauthorised computer version of the boardgame Monopoly

Automonopoli/Go to Jail
- Developer: J. H. Woodhead
- Publisher: Automata UK
- Platform: ZX Spectrum
- Release: 1983
- Modes: Single-player, Multiplayer

Automonopoli, also known as Go to Jail, is an unauthorised computer version of the boardgame Monopoly, released in June 1983 by Automata UK for the ZX Spectrum. Although other two-player Monopoly computer programs already existed, the developer advertised that their Automonopoli was the first with an artificial intelligence strong enough to compete against and defeat human players.

Initially released under the name Automonopoli, Waddingtons threatened legal action against Automata, and within weeks of its release the game was rebranded as Go to Jail. Waddingtons, concerned about the potential impact on a forthcoming official Monopoly video game, began formal court proceedings against Automata in late 1983, and the game was withdrawn from sale in early 1984.

== Initial release ==
Automonopoli was released by Automata UK in June 1983, written primarily in BASIC, and modelled the board game Monopoly in every detail of gameplay. Although other versions of Monopoly for home computers were already in circulation for play between human players, at the time of its release Automonopoli was marketed as the first version of the game with an artificial intelligence advanced enough for the computer to play against human players.

Rather than display the entire board, only two full spaces (and a section of a third) are displayed at one time during gameplay. The board scrolls from right to left as the player advances following each dice roll, while pressing the "X" key takes the player to a separate screen showing a full list of sites and their current ownership, allowing players to buy and sell properties between themselves, to build houses and hotels, and to mortgage and unmortgage properties. On landing on a property the player is offered the chance to buy it; if the player declines, or they have insufficient funds, the property is put up for auction. The game copies the UK version of the Monopoly board game in every significant detail, including the exact wording of the property names and "chance" cards.

Sold almost exclusively by mail order, the game received limited but positive reviews on its release from the few magazines which then covered ZX Spectrum gaming. A short review in ZX Computing at the time of its initial release, praised the "excellent" graphics and the strength of the computer's gameplay, a theme repeated in a brief review in Crash. (Note: Prior to February 1984, Crash had been a mail-order catalogue. Go to Jail received a brief review in its first issue as a computing magazine, in a section in which existing software was reviewed and compared.) The only full-length review, in ZX Computing nine months after the game's original release, (Note: This review reviewed the game under the name of Go to Jail.) also praised the AI's gameplay and said that "the only major complaint I can make against the program is its limited use of sound".

== Legal action and change of name ==
Shortly after its release, Waddingtons, UK publishers of the Monopoly boardgame, raised objections to the Automonopoli title, saying that there was a risk purchasers would confuse the two products. Automata changed the name of the product to Go to Jail in their packaging and advertising, claiming in their advertising that despite being identical in every way, Go to Jail was unrelated to Automonopoli.

Waddingtons was in talks with Parker Brothers (the US publisher of Monopoly) over jointly developing an official Monopoly computer game, and continued to object to perceived infringement by Automata; Waddingtons spokesman Neville Fishwick said "They are riding on the back of a game we have had for 50 years. They know damn well it's not their game, it's ours". In December 1983 Waddingtons began court proceedings against Automata; Automata in turn launched a fundraising campaign with the support of the Computer Trade Association, whose secretary Nigel Blackhurst said "The Waddingtons action represents a major threat to the whole computing industry. If they win about 80 percent of the games software in the market would become challengable". In January 1984, the courts ordered Automata to withdraw the program from sale.

In May 1984 Waddingtons announced that the official ZX Spectrum version of Monopoly would be released shortly by Leisure Genius, although Waddingtons would retain the responsibility for taking legal action against the publishers of other computer games based on the board game. The official Monopoly video game was eventually released in July 1985, and was described by Home Computing Weekly as "vastly superior to the other non-authorised versions".
