= Radia Senki: Reimeihen =

1991 video game

- Box art
- Developer: Tecmo
- Publisher: Tecmo
- Composers: Keiji Yamagishi; Rika Shigeno; Kaori Nakarai
- Platform: Family Computer
- Release: JP: November 15, 1991
- Genre: Action RPG
- Mode: Single-player

Radia Senki: Reimeihen (ラディア戦記 — 黎明篇 —; lit. "Chronicle of the Radia War: Dawn Volume", officially translated as Record of Radia War) is an action role-playing video game developed by Tecmo and released in Japan for the Nintendo Family Computer on November 15, 1991. Though an English release was at one point planned, it was never released outside Japan, with only a prototype ever made. There is a fan translation patch available for this game which allows the game to be played in English.

Radia Senki follows a cast of characters trying to stop the domination of Lemuria by Gadiss, a political leader. The protagonist suffers from amnesia at the beginning of the game, but he does regain his memories by the conclusion of the story.

== Gameplay ==
Radia Senki features both action and console role-playing elements. The player controls one of the five characters available during the game through overhead environments. Players enter battles when the character walks over an invisible battle trigger tile. Battles are fought in real-time, similar to The Legend of Zelda and the screen does not change when a battle occurs. The other characters in the party not controlled by the player can be issued commands during battles, such as fight or regroup. During battle, players can tell the party to act dead, in order to avoid enemies. Characters can also use a variety of damaging and healing spells, as well as spells that affect enemies stats.

Characters gain experience after battles and become stronger. Although spells are learned from finding scrolls, the number of times a spell can be cast increases as characters gain more levels. Enemies typically do not drop gold and many drop items the player can sell. Stores in towns buy and sell items, weapons, and armor and the heroes can rest and save the game in any bed found throughout the game.

== Plot ==
During a battle, the player controls the main character and gives commands to the rest of the party.

Radia Senki begins as the protagonist gains consciousness in a forest, suffering from amnesia. Rescued by Darus, a wandering mage, the hero and his ally witness the crash of a plane and find the unconscious Lefis. When she comes to, it is revealed that her stepbrother Gadiss seeks world domination and is currently looking for the keys to the sacred Radia Tower. She also comments on the fact that the hero's name (chosen by the player) means "Guardian of Light". Meanwhile, Nova, a lackey of Gadiss and the leader of the country Samara, has begun to destroy forests. During this time, Baru, a bandit, Haman, a knight of Lefis, and Saria, a mysterious woman from Samara, join the hero and Darus. Duke Necrude, the leader of the country Zenobia, was put under the control of Samara and kidnaps Lefis. When rescuing her, the heroes learn that Gadiss has finished building the Fitzcarraldo, a powerful airship. Aboard the ship, the party finds Lefis and she reveals that the hero really is the legendary guardian from Ark's legend, but Nova appears and explains that Saria is his daughter and spy. Nova also suggests the hero is the key to opening the Tower, but the hero refuses to help.

Gadiss and Nova seek to open the Tower, which will give them the power to reshape the world, called Lemuria, as they see fit. To open the Tower, they need to collect eight magical items, many of which they already possess. The heroes collect the rest, but the items are stolen by Nova and Saria. Nova opens the Tower and explains that it is only half of Radia. In order to get to the real Radia, both the Tower of the Moon and the Gate of the Sun must be opened. Nova almost kills the heroes, but Saria stops him and sends them to Elfas, the first town from the beginning of the adventure, where the people are descendants of Ark. At the Gate, the heroes defeat Gadiss and open Radia Tower, or Ark Castle. Outside, a person resembling the hero appears, claiming to be the Master of Dreams appears and kidnaps Lefis. The heroes enter the Castle and confront the Master of Dreams, who explains that Lemuria is merely a dream that he has created. He created monsters in order to make the dream world into a nightmare, but the Nightmare Monster devours him and then attacks the party. After the Nightmare is defeated, the hero remembers that he is from the real world and that this world is only a dream. Lefis, who has fallen in love with the hero, begs him to stay, but he is teleported out of Lemuria.

== Release and reception ==
Reception

Review score
Publication	Score
Famicom Tsūshin	4/10, 7/10, 6/10, 5/10

Radia Senki: Reimeihen was released for the Famicom in Japan on November 15, 1991. Among the reviewers in Famitsu, some found the characters' movement too slow, while others said the game felt like a typical action RPG with a few unique elements. The visuals received praise for continuing Tecmo's tradition of visual excellence, though the small size of the onscreen map received criticism.
