= Bad News Baseball =

1989 video game

- North American cover art
- Developer: Tecmo
- Publisher: Tecmo
- Composer: Keiji Yamagishi
- Platform: Nintendo Entertainment System
- Release: JP: December 15, 1989; NA: June 1990
- Genre: Sports
- Modes: Single-player, multiplayer

Bad News Baseball, originally released as Gekitō!! Stadium (激闘スタジアム, Gekitō Sutajiamu; lit. "Fierce Fighting!! Stadium") in Japan, is a baseball video game released by Tecmo for the Japanese Family Computer in 1989, and North America in 1990 for the NES. The goal for players is to defeat every other team in the game. Gameplay can continue indefinitely until this occurs.

== Gameplay ==
Oakland is up to bat against Los Angeles

The main mode in Bad News Baseball is the one-player mode. In this mode, the player must defeat every other team featured in the game in any order in a round-robin style. Wins and losses are not recorded, and the player can continue playing indefinitely until all other teams are defeated. While this means there is not a set schedule of games, pitchers do have a stamina rating that once depleted, will take several games' worth of rest to recover from.

On the initial screen, players can choose to play 1 or 2-player games, spectator mode (CPU vs. CPU), a 1 or 2-player All-Star game, or enter a password. Passwords are given out after every game and record what teams the player has beat, as well as the pitcher's stamina levels.

Functionally, the game plays similarly to R.B.I. Baseball, which is another baseball game that was released for the Family Computer in 1986 and the NES in 1988. There are some differences aimed at a younger audience like anthropomorphic rabbit umpires and kid-friendly animations for events such as home runs and close plays. In addition to this, players can become unconscious when they are forced out or knocked out by the ball. Similar in Nippon Professional Baseball (Japan's professional baseball league), the game will end in a tie after 12 innings.

As in real baseball, typical gameplay includes pinch hitters and pinch runners, stolen bases, four types of pitches and players with different attributes. The game features two leagues, the Ultra League and the Super League. These leagues are based on the National League and the American League of Major League Baseball respectively. Neither the Ultra nor the Super league use the designated hitter rule. At the end of the game, each team's game statistics are tracked and the score by innings is displayed.

Bad News Baseball has 12 teams, each with imaginary rosters. Each team's roster consists of 14 batters (8 starters and 6 reserves) as well as 6 pitchers (4 starters and 2 relievers, though starters could be used in a relief role and vice versa). The player is able to customize the lineup order and fielding positions, as well as choose their desired pitcher. Each player has different abilities based on their ratings, which are related, but not directly tied, to their presented statistics and the teams have varying strengths and weaknesses. The teams themselves correspond loosely to actual Major League Baseball teams. For example, the Oakland team has green and yellow uniforms, much like the real-life Oakland Athletics, but no actual team nicknames are used, and rosters have no resemblance to their MLB counterparts. The game also boasts all-star teams for each of the two leagues, which the player can modify.

The game also features the ability to play as girls. In girl mode, the teams remain the same, but the rosters are completely different, effectively creating 12 new teams. This feat is achieved by holding Down and Left on Controller 1, and holding Up on controller 2 (while still holding Down+Left) and hitting the RESET button on the NES.

=== Teams ===
Super League	Ultra League
Boston	Atlanta
Detroit	Chicago
Minnesota	Los Angeles
Oakland	New York
Texas	St. Louis
Toronto	San Francisco

== Reception ==
Japanese gaming magazine Famitsu rated the game a 25/40.
