= SX2 Media Labs =

American publishing company

SX2 Media Labs LLC
- Industry: Magazine publishing
- Founded: 2005; 21 years ago
- Founders: David Sills; Barry Schwimmer
- Headquarters: New York, New York, United States
- Website: sx2medialabs.com

SX2 Media Labs LLC was a New York City based company which owned and published two United States technology magazines: Computer Shopper (1979–2009) and the once-yearly College Buying Guide.

The company was formed in 2005 by David Sills, and Barry Schwimmer of Stoneybrook Capital, with the goal of becoming a "become a major information provider for technology enthusiasts". Sills and Schwimmer previously worked together as Distance Education Company, which bought distance learning company Home Study Schools Corporation then was sold off in 2004. On 2006-02-06, SX2 purchased Computer Shopper and College Buying Guide from CNET Networks, and 20 days later, on 2006-02-26, Cyber Media (India) Ltd. obtained a 20% stake in SX2. In 2009, SX2 Media Labs ceased publishing Computer Shopper magazine and went fully digital. In 2012, SX2 Media Labs sold the properties to Ziff Davis and ceased operations.
