= Ninja Gaiden (NES video game) =

1988 video game

- North American NES box art
- Developer: Tecmo
- Publisher: Tecmo
- Director: Hideo Yoshizawa
- Artist: Masato Kato
- Writer: Hideo Yoshizawa
- Composers: Keiji Yamagishi; Ryuichi Nitta
- Series: Ninja Gaiden
- Platforms: NES, arcade, PC Engine, mobile phone
- Release: NES: JP: December 9, 1988; NA: March 1989; PAL: August 15, 1991; Arcade: NA: July 15, 1989; PC Engine: JP: January 24, 1992
- Genres: Platform, hack and slash
- Mode: Single-player
- Arcade system: PlayChoice-10

Ninja Gaiden, released in Japan as Ninja Ryūkenden (Note: Japanese: 忍者龍剣伝, Hepburn: Ninja Ryūkenden; lit. 'Legend of the Ninja Dragon Sword') and as Shadow Warriors in Europe, is a 1988 hack and slash platform game developed and published by Tecmo for the Nintendo Entertainment System. Its development and release coincided with the beat 'em up arcade version of the same name. It was released in December 1988 in Japan, in March 1989 in North America, and in August 1991 in Europe. It has been ported to several other platforms, including the PC Engine, the Super NES, and mobile phones.

Set in a retro-futuristic version of 1988, the story follows a ninja named Ryu Hayabusa as he journeys to America to avenge his murdered father. There, he learns that a person named "the Jaquio" plans to take control of the world by unleashing an ancient demon through the power contained in two statues. Featuring side-scrolling platform gameplay similar to Castlevania, players control Ryu through six "Acts" that comprise 20 levels; they encounter enemies that must be dispatched with Ryu's katana and other secondary weapons.

Ninja Gaiden has an elaborate story told through anime-like cinematic cutscenes. It received extensive coverage and won several awards from video gaming magazines, while criticism focused on its high difficulty, particularly in the later levels. Director Hideo Yoshizawa named Ninja Gaiden as his most commercially successful project, with over 1.8 million cartridges sold worldwide. The game continued to receive acclaim from print and online publications, being cited as one of the greatest video games of all time. It was novelized as part of the Worlds of Power game adaptations written by Seth Godin and Peter Lerangis. The game was followed by Ninja Gaiden II: The Dark Sword of Chaos (1990) and Ninja Gaiden III: The Ancient Ship of Doom (1991).

== Plot ==
In Japan, Ninja Ryu Hayabusa finds a letter by his father, Ken, who was seemingly killed in a duel by an unknown assailant. In the letter, Ken instructs his son to find an archeologist named Walter Smith in America. Ryu travels to the nation, but before he can find Dr. Smith, he is shot and kidnapped by a mysterious young woman; she hands him a demonic-looking statue before releasing him. Ryu then sees Walter, who tells him of the demon statues he and Ken had found in some ruins in the Amazon. Walter tells Ryu of an evil demon named Jashin that "SHINOBI" defeated, whose power was confined into "Light" and "Shadow" demon statues. Ryu shows Walter the "Shadow" demon statue given to him by the woman, but during their conversation, a masked figure named Basaquer suddenly breaks into the cabin and steals the Shadow statue. Ryu gives chase, defeats Basaquer, and retrieves the statue, but when he returns, he finds Walter mortally wounded and the Light statue is missing. As Walter dies in his arms, three armed men apprehend Ryu and take him with them.

Ryu is taken to an interrogation room, where he meets agent Foster, head of the Special Auxiliary Unit of the Central Intelligence Agency who denies being responsible for Smith's death. He explains that years ago, a more-than-2000-year-old temple was discovered by Dr. Smith in the Amazon, of which he mysteriously sealed. The Special Auxiliary Unit has been monitoring the activity of Guardia de Mieux, also known as "the Jaquio", who recently moved into the temple where the body of the demon was confined. Using the statues, the Jaquio plans to awaken Jashin and use it to destroy the world.

Ryu is flown to the north-west corner of Brazil, where he is dropped off in a parachute in the jungle near the temple. He discovers the Jaquio has captured the girl who handed him the "Shadow" statue earlier. He orders Ryu to give up the demon statue after threatening the girl's life, then drops Ryu through a trapdoor and into a catacomb. After fighting his way back to the top of the temple, Ryu encounters Bloody Malth, whom he defeats. As he is dying, Malth reveals that he was the one who dueled with Ken, who is still alive.

When he reaches the temple's inner chambers, he discovers his father under Jaquio's control as the Masked Devil. He destroys a crystal orb on the temple chamber wall that was controlling Ken and releases him from Jaquio's hold. An enraged Jaquio shows himself and tries to kill Ryu with a fiery projectile, but Ken throws himself in front of Ryu and takes the hit. Ryu subsequently kills Jaquio, but then a lunar eclipse causes the demon statues to revive Jashin. After Ryu defeats the demon, a dying Ken tells Ryu to leave him behind in the temple while it collapses, and to take the young woman with him. Afterwards, Foster, communicating via satellite, orders the girl to kill Ryu and steal the demon statues; she chooses to be with Ryu instead of carrying out the order. The two kiss, and the woman tells Ryu her name, Irene Lew; they watch as the sun rises.

== Gameplay ==
Gameplay in which the player-character Ryu Hayabusa is about to destroy an enemy bird with his current secondary weapon—a shuriken

Ninja Gaiden is a side-scrolling platform game in which the player takes control of the player-character, Ryu Hayabusa, and guides him through six "Acts" that comprise 20 levels. A life meter represents Ryu's physical strength, which decreases when he is hit by an enemy or projectile. A "life" is lost when the life meter is depleted entirely, when Ryu falls off the screen, or when the timer runs out. A game over screen appears when all lives are lost; however, the player may restart the level where this occurred by continuing. At the end of every Act, the player fights a boss; bosses have life meters depleted by player attacks. When its life meter is depleted entirely, a boss is defeated. Each boss is one of the "Malice Four"—evil underlings of the Jaquio, the game's main antagonist. The Malice Four consist of Barbarian, Bomberhead, Basaquer, and their leader Bloody Malth.

Players attack enemies by thrusting at them with Ryu's Dragon Sword—a katana-like sword passed down by the Hayabusa clan for generations. They can also use secondary weapons that consume Ryu's "spiritual strength". These include throwing stars, "windmill throwing stars", which cut through enemies and return like boomerangs, a series of twirling fireballs named "the art of the fire wheel", and a mid-air slashing technique called the "jump & slash". When Ryu's spiritual strength meter is too low, the player cannot use secondary weapons. Players can replenish Ryu's spiritual strength by collecting red and blue "spiritual strength" items found in lamps and lanterns. Other items found along the way include hourglasses that freeze all enemies and projectiles for five seconds, bonus point containers, potions that restore six units of physical strength, "invincible fire wheels" that make Ryu temporarily invincible to attacks and 1-ups.

Ryu can jump on and off ladders and walls, and by using the directional pad, he can climb up or down ladders. Ryu can spring off walls by holding the directional pad in the opposite direction he is facing and pressing the jump button. He cannot attack while on walls or ladders. Players can use this technique to get Ryu to climb up spaces between walls and columns by holding down the jump button and alternating between left and right on the directional pad. He can also climb a single wall vertically by springing off it and then quickly pressing the directional pad back towards the wall.

Ninja Gaiden's highly responsive, fast-paced gameplay is achieved through the use of limited animation techniques that use fewer frames for animation. For example, the walk cycle animation only used four frames, while contemporary games like Prince of Persia required 12 frames.

== Development ==
Ninja Gaiden was developed and released around the same time as the beat 'em up arcade version of the same name; neither of the games were ports of each other but were parallel projects developed by different teams. According to developer Masato Kato (listed as "Runmaru" in the game's credits), the term "ninja" was gaining popularity in North America, prompting Tecmo to develop a ninja-related game for the NES at the same time the arcade version of Ninja Gaiden was being developed. Hideo Yoshizawa (listed as "Sakurazaki") developed and directed the NES version. Ninja Gaiden was Masato Kato's first full-time project as a video-game designer, and he contributed the game's graphics, animations and instruction-manual illustrations.

Drawing inspiration from the Mario series, Yoshizawa kept the same title but changed everything else; it became a platform game as opposed to a beat 'em up such as Double Dragon, and the gameplay was modeled after Konami's Castlevania, with Ryu being equipped with a katana-like Dragon Sword, shurikens, and ninpo techniques such as fire wheels. In designing the protagonist Ryu Hayabusa, the development team wanted him to be unique from other ninjas. They designed him with a ninja vest to place emphasis on his muscles, and they furnished him with a cowl that arched outward. They originally wanted to equip Ryu with sensors and a helmet with an inside monitor to check his surroundings, but that idea was scrapped. According to Kato, they used specific locations and environments to justify the need for having a ninja for a main character. A further concern, according to Yoshizawa, was to appeal to the gameplay-oriented expectations of Ninja Gaiden's target audience, mainly represented by experienced players who appreciated challenging game design. He recalled that during development, Tecmo adhered to "the philosophy that the user would throw a game away if it wasn't hard enough". As a result, Yoshizawa decided to give the game an overall high level of difficulty.

Yoshizawa placed greater emphasis on the story, unlike the arcade version, and wrote and designed a plot that included over 20 minutes of cinematic cutscenes—the first time an NES game contained such sequences. Yoshizawa stated that the adoption of this presentational style came from his earlier aspiration for a career in commercial filmmaking, which led him to seek an opportunity "to put in a movie somehow". His idea was to reverse the then-prevailing trend wherein the narrative aspects of contemporary NES games were undervalued by consumers with the inclusion of an interesting plot that could engage those players. Tecmo called the cutscene system "Tecmo Theater" in which the game reveals the storyline between Acts through the use of animated sequences. They are used at the beginning of each Act to introduce new characters such as Irene Lew, Walter Smith, and the Jaquio. This feature uses techniques such as close-ups, alternate camera angles, differing background music, and sound effects to make the game more enjoyable for players. Unlike earlier titles such as Final Fantasy, the cutscenes consisted of large anime art on the top half of the screen with dialogue on the bottom half. This made the artistic style more reminiscent of manga titles such as Lupin III and Golgo 13. Dimitri Criona, Tecmo USA's director of sales and marketing, said that console games had an advantage over arcade games in that they allowed the creation of a longer game and the inclusion of cutscenes, which Tecmo trademarked as "cinema screens". He noted console games required a different reward structure than arcade games. The game contains a feature that was originally a glitch but was left in the final game intentionally, according to Masato Kato; having lost to any of the game's last three bosses, the player is sent back to the beginning of the sixth act.

When the game's text was translated from Japanese to English, the game needed to be reprogrammed to accomplish this; different companies handled this process in different ways. Tecmo's Japanese writers wrote rough translations in English and then faxed them to the American division. According to Criona, the American division would "edit it and put it back together, telling the story in a context that an American English speaker would understand. This would go back and forth several times". Moreover, the game's text was stored in picture files instead of raw computer text. Because of the NES's hardware limitations, the English text needed to be very clear and concise to fall within those limitations; many times, different words with the same meaning but with fewer characters had to be used. All symbols and objects were scrutinized by Nintendo of America, who had specific rules on what could be included for North American releases; for instance, any Satanic, Christian, or any other religious, sexual, or drug-related references were not allowed.

In the original Japanese version, Ryu's father's name is Joe Hayabusa. In the English localization, the father's name was changed to Ken Hayabusa, inspired by the nickname of Tecmo USA president Hakata.

== Marketing and release ==
Tecmo first announced the Famicom version of the game in Family Computer Magazine on January 15, 1988, under the title Ninja Gaiden (which would later be used for the game's American version). The game was released in Japan on December 9, 1988, under its final title Ninja Ryūkenden, which roughly translates to Legend of the Dragon Sword. (Note: The Laserdisc for the 1990 Ninja Ryūkenden OVA features the alternate English title of Ninja Ryu: The Dragon Sword Story.)

Since the game's title was deemed too difficult for English audiences to read, it was renamed when it was released in Western markets. In early 1988 advertisements from Nintendo Fun Club News, Tecmo used Ninja Dragon as a tentative title for the U.S. release. They decided to use the title Ninja Gaiden (its original working title) when the game was released in the U.S. in March 1989. The title literally means "Ninja Side-Story", but the game was not intended as a spin-off of any prior work. According to an interview with developer Masato Kato, when deciding how to translate "Ryukenden" into English, the staff chose Ninja Gaiden "because it sounded cool". In Europe, the game released on August 15, 1991. It was retitled as Shadow Warriors—just as Teenage Mutant Ninja Turtles was renamed Teenage Mutant Hero Turtles—as ninjas were considered a taboo subject in Europe. It was one of many ninja-related video games around the time, such as The Legend of Kage, Ninja Warriors, and Shinobi.

Upon Ninja Gaiden's North American release, Nintendo of America, whose play-testers liked the game and gave it high ratings, decided to help with its marketing. Nintendo's house organ Nintendo Power featured it prominently. According to Criona, it did not take a lot of effort to market the game through the magazine, nor did Tecmo or Nintendo do much else to promote it. Ninja Gaiden received strong publicity in Nintendo Power in 1989 and 1990. Ninja Gaiden received preview coverage in the January–February 1989 issue of Nintendo Power in its "Pak Watch" section. It "got the highest marks of any title ... [the magazine's staff had] seen in a long time". It was expected to be No. 1 on their "Player's Poll" quickly. The preview compared Ryu's ability to climb and spring off walls to the gameplay in Metroid. It was featured on the cover of the magazine's March–April 1989 issue and was referenced in the following issue in a Howard and Nester comic strip. It was one of the featured games in both March–April and May–June 1989 issues of the magazine; both issues included a walkthrough up to the fifth Act, a review, and a plot overview. Underlining the game's difficulty, it appeared in several issues in the magazine's "Counselor's Corner" and "Classified Information" help sections.

The game was unveiled at the 1989 International Winter Consumer Electronics Show in Las Vegas. Its display featured a demo of the game and a live person dressed as a ninja. Tecmo predicted that the game would be the top-selling, third-party title for the NES.

Demand for the game eventually exceeded its supply. While Tecmo anticipated the game would be a hit, according to Kohler they did not realize at the time the impact it would have on the video game industry "with its groundbreaking use of cinematics". Yoshizawa would go on to direct the sequel Ninja Gaiden II: The Dark Sword of Chaos (1990) and remained as an executive producer for Ninja Gaiden III: The Ancient Ship of Doom (1991), while Masato Kato took over directing the game design.

=== Ports ===
Nintendo released an arcade version for the PlayChoice-10 on July 15, 1989.

A PC Engine port of Ninja Ryūkenden was produced in 1992, published by Hudson Soft and released only in Japan. It features more colorful and detailed graphics, along with difficulty and gameplay tweaks and a different soundtrack. This version also supports three different language settings with Japanese, English and Chinese as the available options. However, the English translation used in this version differs from the one used in the earlier NES version.

Ninja Gaiden appeared as a remake of the Ninja Gaiden Trilogy compilation for the Super NES in 1995. Some reviewers appreciated the redrawn graphics and music in this version, but others found them to be an inadequate effort. Electronic Gaming Monthly reviewers compared it unfavorably to another updated NES remake, Mega Man: The Wily Wars for the Sega Genesis; they called the version "an exact port-over with no noticeable enhancements in graphics, sound and play control". Along with the other two games in the Ninja Gaiden trilogy, the SNES version was featured as an unlockable game in Ninja Gaiden for the Xbox.

The NES version was released on Wii's Virtual Console on April 10, 2007, in Japan and on May 14 in North America. Europeans, Australians, and New Zealanders were able to purchase the game as part of "Hanabi Festival" on September 21. The PC Engine version was released for Virtual Console in Japan on April 21, 2009. The NES version was also released for the Nintendo 3DS Virtual Console, with an original release date set for November 8, 2012, but was delayed until December 13. The NES version was released on Wii U's Virtual Console in 2014. The game was also re-released as part of the NES Classic Edition dedicated console in November 2016, and for the Nintendo Switch in December 2018 as part of the Nintendo Classics service.

== Related media ==
In July 1990 Scholastic Corporation published a novelization of Ninja Gaiden under the Worlds of Power series of NES game adaptations, created and packaged by Seth Godin under the pseudonym F. X. Nine. Godin and Peter Lerangis, under the pseudonym A. L. Singer, wrote the novelization. As with the other Worlds of Power books, the amount of violence present in the video game was toned down in the novelization, because Godin and Scholastic were concerned that some of the material in the video game was inappropriate for a young audience. The novel did not adhere strictly to the game's storyline; for instance, the ending was changed so that Ryu's father survived. Godin believed the revised ending was consistent with the Worlds of Power character. As real-life fathers Godin and Lerangis were reluctant to leave Ryu fatherless. On the book's cover, otherwise a copy of the North American box art, the kunai held in Ryu's front hand was airbrushed out, leaving him prodding the air with an empty fist.

Pony Canyon released a soundtrack CD, Ninja Ryukenden: Tecmo GSM-1, in February 1989. The first half of the CD starts with an arranged medley of the game's music. It continues with enhanced versions of the game's music which used stereophonic sound and additional PCM channels. The rest of the CD features music from the arcade version. In 2017, Brave Wave Productions released a vinyl box set, Ninja Gaiden- the Definitive Soundtrack, mastered by original composer Keiji Yamagishi.

== Reception ==
=== Commercial performance ===
While moderately successful in Japan, the game was significantly more successful in North America, where it became a major commercial hit. According to Tecmo USA's Dimitri Criona, high demand led to repeated orders for Ninja Gaiden in increments of 60,000 cartridges per order. On the Computer Entertainer video game charts, it reached number three by August 1989 (below Super Mario Bros. 2 and Blaster Master). On the Toy & Hobby World charts, it was the second top-selling video game by October 1989 (below Zelda II). On the Famitsu USA charts, it was the second top-selling NES game by December 1989 (below Tetris).

Ninja Gaiden went on to sell about 300,000 units in Japan and 1.5 million units in the United States, for a total of over 1.8 million cartridges sold worldwide. Reflecting on his career as a game designer, Yoshizawa considered Ninja Gaiden–along with Klonoa: Door to Phantomile–his proudest accomplishment, explaining that the title enjoyed the best sales performance out of all of his projects.

=== Critical reception ===
Ratings

Review scores
Publication	Score			
Publication	3DS	NES	TurboGrafx-16	Wii
1Up.com				B−
Famitsu		28/40		
IGN				9/10
Jeuxvideo.com		18/20		
Joypad			90%	
Nintendo World Report	9/10			
Player One		85%		
Raze		90/100		
Total!		47%		
Video Games (DE)		70%		
VideoGames & Computer Entertainment		Positive		
Mean Machines		90%		

Awards
Publication	Award
Nintendo Power (1989)	Best Challenge, Best Ending
Electronic Gaming Monthly (1989)	Best Game of the Year (NES), Best Ending in a Video Game

The game debuted at No. 3 on Nintendo Power's Top 30 list for July–August 1989, behind Zelda II: The Adventure of Link and Super Mario Bros. 2; it stayed at No. 3 in the September–October 1989 issue. The Nintendo Power Awards '89 featured the game as one of the top games that year. It was nominated for Best Graphics and Sound, Best Challenge, Best Theme, Fun, Best Character (Ryu Hayabusa), Best Ending, and Best Overall; and it won for Best Challenge and Best Ending. In its preview of Ninja Gaiden II: The Dark Sword of Chaos, the magazine said that "the colorful, detailed and dynamic cinema scenes of the original Ninja Gaiden set a standard for action game narration that has since been widely emulated. These cinema scenes made Ninja Gaiden play almost like a movie."

Beyond press coverage by Nintendo Power, the game received strong reviews and publicity from other video gaming magazines upon its release. In a review from VideoGames & Computer Entertainment, the presentation and gameplay were compared to Castlevania, while the cinematic cutscenes were compared favorably to Karateka and other computer games by Cinemaware. The review praised the game's animation in these cutscenes and noted Tecmo's usage of close-ups and body movements. The reviewer said that while the cutscenes were not fluid, they were effective and entertaining and provided important information about what the player was supposed to do. He appreciated the game had unlimited continues which slightly offset its difficulty, but he criticized it for having over-detailed background graphics especially in the indoor levels, saying that some bottomless pits and items in these levels become slightly camouflaged. From July to October 1989, the game was listed at No. 1 on Electronic Gaming Monthly's Top Ten Video Games list; it fell to No. 2 on the list behind Mega Man 2 in the November issue. In their Best and Worst of 1989, it received awards for Best Game of the Year for the NES and Best Ending in a Video Game for all consoles. The staff said that Ninja Gaiden "proved to be an instant winner" with its cinematic cutscenes and unique gameplay. They added the game's climax was better than some movies' climaxes at the time and that it established continuity for a sequel, which would be released the following year. Later in June 1994, the magazine ranked it at No. 4 on a special list of Top Ten Most Difficult Games of all time for all consoles.

The July 1990 pilot issue of UK magazine Mean Machines featured Ninja Gaiden on the cover; the magazine was distributed as part of the July 1990 issue of Computer and Video Games. In its review, Julian Rignall compared the game to its beat 'em up arcade counterpart, which was titled Shadow Warriors. He noted the game has great graphics that feature diverse backgrounds and character sprites; he especially praised its use of cartoon-like animation sequences between Acts where the game's plot unfolds. He enjoyed the game's difficulty especially with the bosses, but he noted the game will seem tough at first until players become accustomed to the controls. He criticized the game for its sound, which he said did not fit with the graphics and was "racy" but added "what's there is atmospheric and suits the action". He highly recommended the game to fans of the beat 'em up and combat genres. A review in Computer Entertainer complimented the games story and "excellent animation" which they found enhanced the martial arts-themed gameplay.

Mean Machines reviewed the game again (the NES version now officially titled Shadow Warriors in Europe) in its July 1991 issue. In the review, Matt Regan and Paul Glancey praised its detailed and animated character sprites and its difficulty level. The game's high standards of gameplay, sound, and overall depth impressed Regan; he noted the game's frustrating difficulty but pointed out that it has unlimited continues. Glancey compared the game to the 1990 NES version of Batman (released later in 1990) with its similar wall-jumping mechanics; he said that its graphics were not as well-developed as Batman's but were still satisfactory. He praised its detailed sprites and their animations along with the "Tecmo Theater" concept, noting that the cutscenes "help supply a lot of atmosphere". He said it is one of the best arcade-style games on the NES as well as the best ninja-related game on the system.

The Japanese magazine Famitsu gave it a score of 28 out of 40. The game received some praise and criticism in the August 1991 issue of German magazine Power Play. The review praised the game for its attention to detail and challenge and noted players need to master certain gameplay skills to move on. Criticisms included a "lack of variety" and dullness in gameplay which was compared to a "visit to the tax office". The PC Engine version was briefly mentioned in the December 1991 issue of Electronic Gaming Monthly as part of a review of games that had been released outside the U.S. They noted the faithful translation from the NES version as well as the revamped and more detailed graphics, saying "PC Engine owners should not miss this one!" The perceived excessive difficulty frustrated Total! reviewer Andy to the point of being a deal breaker. He additionally criticized the game's platform genre as unoriginal.

=== Legacy ===
Ninja Gaiden initiated the original Ninja Gaiden game series and was followed by Ninja Gaiden II: The Dark Sword of Chaos (1990), and Ninja Gaiden III: The Ancient Ship of Doom (1991).

In 2004, Tecmo began releasing low-priced episodic installments of Ninja Gaiden for AT&T and Verizon mobile phones on both BREW and Java platforms. The official English Tecmo Games' mobile website advertised it for a future release along with a mobile version of Tecmo Bowl. The company planned to release the entire game throughout 2004 in a series of four installments—similar to what Upstart Games did when they ported the NES version of Castlevania to mobile phones. The port featured the same visuals and soundtrack as the NES version. Each installment was to consist of several levels of gameplay at a time. The first installment, titled Ninja Gaiden Episode I: Destiny, was released on July 15, 2004; it included only the first Act from the NES version but added two new levels. The second installment was planned to be released in North America and was previewed by GameSpot in September 2004, but it—along with the third and fourth installments—was never released.

The mobile phone port of Ninja Gaiden was met with some praise and criticism. IGN's Levi Buchanan and GameSpot's Damon Brown praised the port for its accurate translation from the NES to mobile phones, saying the gameplay, graphics, and cinematic cutscenes remain true to the NES version. They praised the game's controls, despite the omission of the ability to duck so that pressing "down" on the phone's directional pad could be used for secondary weapons; Brown said the port had better controls than most other mobile phone games at the time. They both criticized the port for its lack of sound quality, but Buchanan said this was not Tecmo's fault. In a preview of the port, GameSpot's Avery Score pointed to generally inferior American-made handsets as the reason for the sound's shortcomings.

Retro Gamer took a look back at Ninja Gaiden in its March 2004 issue, when the Xbox reboot was released. They said the game broke the mold of conventional video game titles by including a plot with cinematic cutscenes added between gameplay segments, adding that the concept of adding cinematics for a game's introduction, plot, and ending was a new concept which "naturally impressed the gaming public". The article noted the game's high level of difficulty, saying the game "threw up an immense challenge even for the veteran gamer, and almost dared you to complete it mentally and physically intact". Chris Kohler, in his 2004 book Power-Up: How Japanese Video Games Gave the World an Extra Life, said, while it was not as far-reaching as Tecmo Bowl, "it ended up revolutionizing video games with its courageous, unique, and trailblazing use of cinema scenes".

Upon its release on the Virtual Console, Ninja Gaiden was met with high praise, especially for its elaborate story, amount of narrative, and use of anime-like cinematic sequences. Some critics have bemoaned its gameplay for being too similar to Castlevania; similarities include identical displays on the top of the screen, items contained in breakable lanterns, and a nearly identical "secondary weapons" feature. A 1UP.com review noted that the two games have different dynamics and that several actions possible in Ninja Gaiden would be impossible in Castlevania. Contemporary reviews have considered the game "groundbreaking" for its pioneering use of stylized cutscenes, high quality music, and dark atmosphere. One review said that the game makes up for its high difficulty level with good gameplay. IGN said that it is one of the best platform games of all time.

Reviewers have criticized the game for its high and unforgiving difficulty level especially late in the game, and it has been considered an example of "Nintendo Hard" video games. A review by 1UP.com referred to the later levels as an "unfair display of intentional cheapness". In his review of the Virtual Console version, GameSpot's Alex Navarro said "the game will beat you to a pulp" and that it "assaults you time and time again with its punishing difficulty, insidiously placed enemies, and rage-inducing boss fights". According to his review, the game starts easy, but the difficulty begins to increase halfway through the second Act and continues through the sixth Act; Navarro describes the sixth Act's difficulty as "one of the bottom levels of gaming hell". IGN said that the game was one of the most difficult video games of all time, setting the trend for the rest of the series; however, they pointed out that its difficulty and graphics are "defining characteristics [that] have carried over through the years into modern day [Ninja] Gaiden sequels". Nintendo World Report, in a review for the 3DS Virtual Console, acknowledged the game's high difficulty level and highlighted the "rhythm and cadence" to the movement of the player character. ScrewAttack listed the game as the seventh hardest title in the NES library.

Ninja Gaiden has maintained its position as one of the most popular games for the NES. A 2006 Joystiq reader poll, with over 12,000 votes, listed the game at No. 10 on a list of top NES games. Another reader poll from GameSpot listed the game at No. 10 in its top 10 NES games list. It was No. 17 on IGN's Top 100 NES Games list. In August 2001 in its 100th issue, Game Informer listed the game at No. 93 in their Top 100 Games of All Time list. In 2006 Electronic Gaming Monthly featured a follow-up to their The 200 Greatest Videogames of Their Time, where readers wrote in and discussed games they felt were ignored on the list; the game was listed at No. 16 of the top 25 games discussed. At the end of 2005, Nintendo Power ran a serial feature titled The Top 200 Nintendo Games Ever. The list, which included games for all Nintendo systems, placed the game at No. 89. In August 2008, the same magazine ranked it the tenth best NES game of all time; they praised the gameplay and described the cinematic cutscenes as revolutionary for its time. The game's music received honorable mention on IGN's list of Best 8-Bit Soundtracks. IGN featured its introduction on its Top 100 Video Game Moments list at #53; it was also listed as the second best video game cutscene of all time in Complex magazine.

Nintendo Power honored the game in its November 2010 issue, which celebrated the 25th anniversary of the NES. The magazine listed its box art, which depicts a ninja with a burning city in the background, as one of its favorite designs in the NES library. The magazine's Editor-in-Chief Chris Slate was equally impressed by the game's box art. He also reminisced about the game's high level of difficulty with its re-spawning enemies and enemy birds that knocked players into pits, saying this game "may have taught me how to curse". He further praised gameplay features such as clinging on walls and using ninpo techniques, and he noted the game's cinematic cutscenes, including the ominous opening sequence that featured two ninjas who launch into the air at each other clashing their swords in the moonlight. He said that "Ninja Gaiden was about as cool as an 8-bit game could be, especially for ninja-crazed kids of the '80s who, like me, had worn out their VHS copies of Enter the Ninja". In a July 2011 issue, Retro Gamer listed the game's opening as one of the most popular at the time. The magazine noted how its use of cutscenes, animations, and overall presentation put the game above most other action titles at the time. While it lauded the controls and gameplay elements, as with other reviews, it criticized the difficulty, calling it "one of the most challenging games on the console". It noted how defeated enemies re-spawn in certain spots, how enemies are placed on the edges of platforms, and the structure of the final level.
