= Pi-balled =

1984 video game

- Publisher: Automata UK
- Programmer: Jason Austin
- Artist: Colin Tuck
- Platform: ZX Spectrum
- Release: 1984

Pi-balled is a video game written by Jason Austin for the ZX Spectrum and published by Automata UK in 1984. Pi-balled is a Q*bert clone.

== Gameplay ==
Pi-balled is a game in which the player avoids descending enemies while jumping between blocks on a pyramid and changing the colors on the cubes.

== Reception ==
Noel Williams reviewed Pi-balled for Imagine magazine, and stated that "If you want another fast action, eyestraining, fingerbreaking activity, you'll enjoy this, but if it is your mind or imagination that needs the exercise, forget it."
