= Ninja Gaiden III: The Ancient Ship of Doom =

1991 video game

- North American NES box art
- Developer: Tecmo (Note: Lynx version developed by Atari Corporation.)
- Publishers: NES; Tecmo; Lynx; Atari Corporation
- Director: Masato Kato
- Writers: M. Akama; Masato Kato
- Composers: Hiroshi Miyazaki; Kaori Nakabai; Rika Shigeno
- Series: Ninja Gaiden
- Platforms: NES, arcade, Atari Lynx, SNES
- Release: NES: JP: June 21, 1991; NA: August 1991; Arcade: NA: 1992; Lynx: NA: 1993; EU: 1993
- Genre: Platform
- Mode: Single-player
- Arcade system: PlayChoice-10

Ninja Gaiden III: The Ancient Ship of Doom (Note: Known in Japan as Ninja Ryūkenden III: Yomi no Hakobune (忍者龍剣伝III 黄泉(よみ)の方船(はこぶね); lit. 'Legend of the Ninja Dragon Sword III: The Ark from Yomi')) is a 1991 platform game developed and published by Tecmo for the Nintendo Entertainment System (NES). It was later ported to the Atari Lynx by Atari Corporation in 1993, and was also re-released as part of Tecmo's Ninja Gaiden Trilogy Super NES compilation in 1995. It was designed by Masato Kato, who took over for Hideo Yoshizawa, the designer of the first two games in the NES series.

The game is the third installment of the Ninja Gaiden trilogy in terms of release, but is chronologically set between the first two games in the series, Ninja Gaiden and Ninja Gaiden II: The Dark Sword of Chaos. Although the American box art and in-game dialogue suggests that the game takes place years after the first game, The Dark Sword of Chaos supposedly takes place one year after the first, while the Japanese version takes place in between the first two games; the ending screen briefly makes mention of this. The player controls Ryu Hayabusa as he is framed for the murder of Irene Lew and investigates the circumstances behind her death. He eventually discovers a plan by CIA agent Foster and another person named Clancy to utilize an interdimensional rift to create and control a race of energy-infused superhuman mutants. The game features similar gameplay to its previous two Ninja Gaiden titles and includes some new features such as the ability to hang overhead from pipes and sword power-ups.

As with the previous titles, Ninja Gaiden III received mostly positive reviews from critics. Early reviews praised the game for its plot, gameplay, and difficulty; later reviews criticized the plot, level designs, and the game's difficulty level, in which the North American version was intentionally made harder than the Japanese version through limited continues, stronger enemies, and omission of a password system. The Atari Lynx port, while receiving general praise for graphics and controls, received poor reception for its sound and for the inability for players to see characters and items, attributing it to the Lynx's small screen.

The game was re-released for the Virtual Console service in North America in 2008 for the Wii, in 2013 for the Nintendo 3DS, and on the Nintendo Classics service in 2026.

== Plot ==
Between the events of the original Ninja Gaiden and Ninja Gaiden II: The Dark Sword of Chaos, CIA agent Irene Lew is chased by a man who looks like Ryu Hayabusa to a cliff edge, where she falls to her apparent death. In an effort to clear his name, Ryu investigates the laboratory where Irene was killed. A mysterious man appears there and tells Ryu to go to the Castle Rock fortress, where he will give Ryu more information about Irene. On his way, Ryu encounters A. Foster (Note: The head of the CIA's Special Auxiliary Unit in Ninja Gaiden) via a video image, who claims to be unaware of Irene's whereabouts, and the look-alike who killed Irene. The look-alike flees, saying that Foster has ordered him not to eliminate Ryu quite yet.

Ryu encounters the stranger from the laboratory, who reveals his name as Clancy. Clancy reveals that he and Foster were working together until Foster began to design creatures called "bio-noids" – transformed superhumans that are infused with "life energy" from an interdimensional rift that appeared after the demon from Ninja Gaiden was defeated. Clancy pleas to Ryu to stop Foster. When confronted by Ryu, Foster reveals his plan to kill him and make a powerful bio-noid from his corpse. Irene appears to the surprise of both Ryu and Foster. Ryu's look-alike transmutes into a bio-noid, which Ryu defeats.

A door to the interdimensional rift opens. Clancy appears, telling Ryu, Irene, and Foster that they were all used as pawns in his plan to take over the ruins and claim the life energy as his. Foster tries to follow Clancy through the door, but the energy destroys him utterly. Ryu goes through the rift into the subspace while Irene stays behind. Inside the subspace, Ryu encounters his resurrected and strengthened look-alike, and kills him once and for all. Ryu is teleported from the subspace into a room where he meets Clancy once again. Clancy explains Castle Rock's ruins are a dimensional warship called the "Ancient Ship of Doom". He says that "these super-dimensional ruins are the foundation upon which a new world will be created", and that it will be where all new life will originate from. The ship reappears in the real world, and Clancy fires a test shot to demonstrate its power while Irene watches in horror.

Ryu fights his way back through the ship and confronts Clancy, who has turned himself into a bio-noid. Clancy gives Ryu the offer to join him and work to wipe out the human race and usher a new age, but Ryu refuses and kills him after a lengthy battle. Ryu is transported outside the warship and back to Irene. Both watch as the Ancient Ship of Doom is brought down and explodes, and Castle Rock crumbles. The two watch the sunrise as a new day begins.

== Gameplay ==
One of Ninja Gaiden III's features included the ability for Ryu Hayabusa to hang overhead from pipes, as shown above.

Ninja Gaiden III: The Ancient Ship of Doom is a side-scrolling platform game in which the player controls the player character Ryu Hayabusa as he investigates the events behind Irene Lew's death. In the game, Ryu can jump, hang, and climb up and down walls with the control pad; pressing the jump button while holding the control pad the direction away from the wall causes Ryu to spring off the wall. Ryu is also able to attack enemies with secondary weapons while on a wall by pressing the attack button. A new feature introduced in Ninja Gaiden III is the ability for Ryu to hang overhead from pipes or ivy; he can swing up on top or drop from them, and as with walls, he can only attack enemies while hanging with secondary weapons.

As with the previous Ninja Gaiden games, Ryu's physical strength is represented by a life meter on the top of the screen; it decreases when Ryu gets hit by enemies or other dangerous objects. Throughout the levels, the player can find "Recovery Medicine" bottles that partially replenish Ryu's physical strength; as with all other items in the game, they are located in crystal balls that Ryu must slash to open. The player loses a "life" when Ryu's life meter runs out, he falls into a pit, or if the timer runs out. The game ends when players lose all their lives, but they can continue and resume play at the beginning of the Act in which they have lost all their lives. However, in the US version of Ninja Gaiden III, players only get five continues total before being required to restart the game from the beginning.

Ryu can defeat enemies by attacking with his Dragon Sword or by using secondary weapons which consume Ryu's "ninja power"; such weapons include the following: "Windmill Throwing Stars" which move back and forth like boomerangs, "Fire Dragon Balls" which launch fireballs downward at an angle, the "Fire Wheel Art" which launches fireballs upward at an angle, the "Invincible Fire Wheel" that forms a series of rotating of fireballs around Ryu and destroys any enemy who comes into contact, and a new weapon in this series called the "Vacuum Wave Art" which hurls vacuum blades above and below Ryu simultaneously. Players can collect red and blue capsules to refill Ryu's ninja power, and they can also collect "Scrolls of the spirit of the Dragon" to increase Ryu's maximum ninja power level. Another new item in Ninja Gaiden III is the "Dragon Spirit Sword" that increases Ryu range of his sword. At the end of each Act is a boss which has its own life meter that decreases when damaged; Ryu can defeat the boss by completely depleting its life meter. Ninja Gaiden III's first four bosses consist of the "bio-noids" – super-human creatures created and controlled by Foster to take over the world; they each represent the four elementals: earth, wind, fire, and water.

=== Tiger Handheld version ===
Ninja Gaiden III: The Ancient Ship of Doom was ported by Tiger Electronics as an LCD handheld game. This port features five levels in which Ryu must reach the end of each level by defeating various robots with his Dragon Sword and a "ninja weapon ball". At the end of each level, Ryu fights a boss; the first four levels' bosses are the same bio-noids from the NES version, while the fifth level's final enemy is the "Giant Boss", which must be defeated to beat the game. Gameplay is similar to the NES version, in that Ryu and the bosses have life meters and that they feature similar items. Features included built-in sound which could be muted, battery backup high score, and an automatic switch-off feature in which the device shuts off after three minutes of inactivity.

== Development ==
Ninja Gaiden III: The Ancient Ship of Doom was designed by Masato Kato, who took over Hideo Yoshizawa's main role in the game's development from the previous two titles. In an interview with Kato, he said that Ninja Gaiden III needed "to go into a new direction". The game was given more of a science-fiction motif as opposed to the Cthulhu Mythos motif in the previous two titles; the enemies changed to look more robotic than in the previous games. The original intent from the developers was to make the game easier than the previous titles, "to create a game a normal player can enjoy". However, Tecmo released the game for the NES with a much higher difficulty level than the Japanese version by doubling the amount of damage the player took from 1 health bar per hit to 2 health bars per hit. They also decided to place the events of Ninja Gaiden III between the events of the first two titles in order to maintain continuity; they figured that it was too difficult to continue the story after Ninja Gaiden II: The Dark Sword of Chaos, so they developed the plot sometime before the events of Ninja Gaiden II that revolved around the game's main antagonist, Foster.

== Release ==
Ninja Gaiden III was first released for the Famicom in Japan (under the title Ninja Ryūkenden III: Yomi no Hakobune) on June 26, 1991, followed by North America for the NES in August; the NES version was not released in Europe. Nintendo released an arcade version for the PlayChoice-10 in 1992. It was ported to the Atari Lynx in 1993 by Atari Corporation. Tecmo re-released the game as part of its Ninja Gaiden Trilogy Super NES compilation in 1995.

It was released for the Wii's Virtual Console service in North America on February 18, 2008; it was later released for the Nintendo 3DS Virtual Console in North America on November 28, 2013, followed by Europe on January 23, 2014. Hamster Corporation released the game as part of their Console Archives series for the Nintendo Switch 2 and PlayStation 5 in April 2026.

== Reception ==
Reception

Review scores
Publication	Score
AllGame	Lynx: 3/5
Electronic Gaming Monthly	Lynx: 8/10, 6/10, 6/10, 6/10; NES: 8/10, 8/10, 8/10, 8/10
Famitsu	NES: 6/10, 6/10, 8/10, 6/10
GamePro	Lynx: 17/20; NES: 24/25
IGN	NES: 8/10
VideoGames & Computer Entertainment	Lynx: 7/10; NES: 7/10

Award
Publication	Award
Nintendo Power	"Best Challenge" (NES), 1991

Ninja Gaiden III: The Ancient Ship of Doom received preview coverage in Electronic Gaming Monthly when it was displayed at the Consumer Software Group trade show in Tokyo on March 24–25, 1991. The magazine said that Ninja Gaiden III was the best Famicom game in display there, and that it "easily walked away with the best for this system!" The game was also previewed in the July 1991 issue of Nintendo Power, which said that the game contained all the old features of previous Ninja Gaiden games, which included ninja arts (however, they lamented at the lack of the "jump and slash" absent from Ninja Gaiden II: The Dark Sword of Chaos) and similar usage of cinematic cutscenes that made the original Ninja Gaiden popular. They also particularly praised the new moves Ryu had, as well as an excellent plot. GamePro magazine previewed the game in August, and said that the game's visuals were good and on par with the previous titles and that the scrolling was great.

The game was featured in Electronic Gaming Monthly's July 1991 issue as an "EGM Exclusive". They praised the game, saying that "Ninja Gaiden gets better every time!" It was also one of the featured games in the August issue of Nintendo Power, where it received 11 pages of coverage, including a full walkthrough of the first four Acts and a brief plot overview of the entire game. It was in this issue where Ninja Gaiden III was purported to be the final Ninja Gaiden game by Tecmo. As in their preview, they gave praise to the action, gameplay, elaborate plot, and difficulty. GamePro reviewed the game in its September issue and gave the game top ratings in all categories except sound. They noted the difficulty level as being dictated by the enemies' strategic placements in the various environments; they added that while Act 1 is easy, the remainder of the game is very difficult. The review praised the usage and usefulness of the secondary weapons, Ryu's new ability to hang overhead, and the new addition of the sword power-up, which it said bore resemblance to the game Strider. They slightly criticized the game for leaving out the "cloning" power-up from Ninja Gaiden II: The Dark Sword of Chaos, as well as the limited continues and lack of passwords. In March 1992, Ninja Gaiden III received three nominations in the "Nintendo Power Awards '91" in the following NES-related categories: "Best Graphics and Sound", "Best Challenge", and "Best Overall". It won in the "Best Challenge" category; the magazine commented that "the game-playing public knows a challenging game when they see one!" It placed second in the "Best Graphics and Sound" category, finishing behind Battletoads for the top spot. It was the ranked as the third "Best Overall" NES title for 1991, finishing close behind Tecmo Super Bowl. In Famitsu, four reviewers found it to be a refined and easier playthrough than the previous titles. While two reviewers felt it was too similar to the previous games to freel like a new release, another reviewer felt it was the most refined and easy-to-play of the three games. While reviewer said the graphics during the cutscenes as highlights, they felt they had lost their luster as the series has gone on.

The Atari Lynx version of Ninja Gaiden III also received coverage in various magazines in 1994. GamePro criticized the fact that the Lynx's small screen makes it difficult for players to see the various power-ups and enemies and to use secondary weapons. However, the magazine praised the controls and said the sound was fine, if "weird and spacy". VideoGames & Computer Entertainment praised the game for being better than the arcade version of Ninja Gaiden that was previously ported to the Lynx, but was disappointed that Tecmo did not port the first two NES Ninja Gaiden titles to the handheld as well. Electronic Gaming Monthly praised Tecmo for a good translation of the game from the NES to the Lynx – complete with good graphics, controls, and varied gameplay – while saying that "Ninja Gaiden [III] is a game that the Atari Lynx has been longing for". Despite that, the reviewers noted that the Lynx's small screen made all the sprites too small for most players to see well, and the screen's blurring makes it frustrating for players to track character movements. Retrospectively, Allgame gave a mostly negative review, saying that the background makes it difficult to see foreground elements, that players cannot see their character or what power-ups they are collecting, and that sound is very poor, saying "thirteen banshees all wailing different, off-key songs would only begin to approach just how bad the music is".

A few modern video gaming websites reviewed Ninja Gaiden III upon its release for the Virtual Console in 2008. Nintendo Life's Damien McFerran gave lackluster ratings, saying that the game "passed under the radar of many a videogame enthusiast". He added that while the presentation was great, he pointed out flaws in the "silly" plot, the inconsistently laid-out level designs, and frustrating difficulty in addition to the five-continue limit. He said that many gamers would prefer the previous two Ninja Gaiden titles over this one. IGN's Lucas Thomas appreciated the improvement in Ryu's ability to scale and climb on top of walls, his ability to hang overhead. His chief criticism was the game's difficulty, saying that it's not the "rewarding kind of difficult" but instead "the cheap, annoying kind of difficult that makes you want to throw your controller at the TV screen and just go read a book". As with the Nintendo Life review, Thomas similarly criticized the inconsistent level design as well as a storyline which "begins [...] compellingly" but progressively becomes more bizarre, including "weird science-fiction themes about bionics and clones".

In a retrospective of the Ninja Gaiden series, Eurogamer said that Ninja Gaiden III was the only game in the NES trilogy not to make it to Europe. They made similar criticisms about the difficulty level, saying that the North American version was made more difficult than the Japanese version by utilizing limited continues, making the enemies much more powerful, and removing the password system present in the Japanese version. They said the story was too outlandish, calling the plot, of which a short-lived anime Ninja Gaiden series would loosely be based, "a glorious load of old bollocks". While the version from Ninja Gaiden Trilogy for the Super NES remedied most of their criticisms, they said that the game added new frustrations which included slower framerates, lower-quality controls, and the omission and shuffling around of several tracks, which they said "is precisely the sort of thing that makes die-hard videogame fans apoplectic with rage".

== Soundtrack ==
The game's soundtrack, composed by Hiroshi Miyazaki, Kaori Nakabai, and Rika Shigeno, was not released commercially at the time of the game's release. A formal soundtrack release was unavailable until Brave Wave Productions' 2017 vinyl box set, Ninja Gaiden- the Definitive Soundtrack. The set was mastered by Keiji Yamagishi, and featured the soundtrack of the entire original trilogy.
