= Keiji Yamagishi =

Japanese video game music composer

Keiji Yamagishi 山岸 継司
- Genres: Video game music
- Occupations: Composer, arranger
- Years active: 1987–present
- Label: Brave Wave Productions

Keiji Yamagishi (山岸 継司, Yamagishi Keiji) is a Japanese video game music composer. He is known for his work on Tecmo's late 1980s and early 1990s NES titles, such as Ninja Gaiden. Yamagishi has been considered a pioneer of chiptune music, producing the soundtracks of numerous titles in the 8 bit era.

== Career ==
Yamagishi's first musical experiences came from a band he joined in high school; when applying to Tecmo in 1987 he had no intention of becoming a professional composer. When his experience with music was raised during the job interview, he accepted the role. In addition to composition, he worked on sound programming and sound effects, spending six months learning the programming side after taking the job.

Yamagishi's first title with Tecmo was Tsuppari Ozumo, and he would go on to work on critically acclaimed title Ninja Gaiden the following year. He composed for numerous NES titles over his tenure with Tecmo, concluding in the early 90s with the release of the Super NES. Yamagishi has referred to Radia Senki: Reimeihen (1991) as his greatest NES composition.

Yamagisihi stopped working on games as they began to move away from the chiptune style, stating that he felt his music was "no longer needed". His last title of the era was Onimusha Tactics on the Game Boy Advance in 2003. He instead began working on ringtones for phones.

In 2013, Yamagishi joined the record label Brave Wave Productions, which specialises in the music of chiptune pioneers. Brave Wave would go on to support the release of his debut solo album Retro-Active Pt. 1, with many other artists from the label such as Stemage and Manami Matsumae collaborating on the project. In 2014 he returned to writing original video game soundtracks, working on several retro and indie titles such as Exile's End.

== Style and influences ==
Yamagishi has described his music as having a "comical, Japanese style", and has cited several influences such as Prince and The Beach Boys.

== Works ==
- Tsuppari Ozumo (1987)
- Star Force (US NES version) (1987)
- Tecmo Bowl (1987)
- Ninja Gaiden (1988)
- Bad News Baseball (1989)
- Captain Tsubasa Vol. II: Super Striker (1990)
- Radia Senki: Reimeihen (1991)
- Tecmo Super Bowl (1991)
- Tecmo Cup Soccer Game (1992)
- Onimusha Tactics (2003)
- Adventure Time: The Secret of the Nameless Kingdom (2014)
- Exile's End (2015)
- The Messenger (2018, bonus tracks only)
- Streets of Rage 4 (2020, with many others)
- Oppaidius Desert Island! (2021, with many others)
- Teenage Mutant Ninja Turtles: Shredder's Revenge (2024, with many others)

=== Solo discography ===
- In Flux (2014, with many others)
- Retro-Active Pt. 1 (2015)
- Retro-Active Pt. 2 (2016)
- The Retro-Active Experience (2019)

=== Guest appearances ===
- Brave Wave Productions – World 1–2 (2017)
