= Piromania =

1984 video game

- Developer: Automata UK
- Publishers: Automata UK; Strange Loop
- Release: 1984
- Genre: Platform

Piromania is a 1984 platform game published by Automata UK for the ZX Spectrum. Strange Loop previously published the game as Infernal Combustion.

== Gameplay ==
Piromania is a game in which the player is Walter who must put out the fires that PiMan sets as he runs around Walter's house.

== Reception ==
Daniel Canavan reviewed Piromania for Imagine magazine and stated that, "Arcade games generally don't hold my interest long. This one, however, is not bad, so if you are into arcade action and high score tables, I recommend it."
