= Mel Croucher =

British writer and video game pioneer

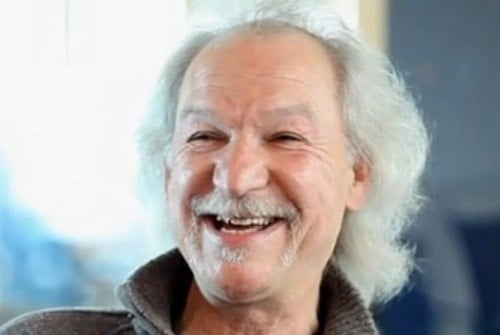
- Croucher in 2025
- Born: 1948 (age 77–78)
- Occupations: Entrepreneur, writer, video game designer
- Known for: immersive entertainment pioneer

Mel Croucher (born 1948) is a British entrepreneur and video games pioneer. Originally an architect, he moved into computers and in 1977 launched one of the very earliest games companies, Automata UK, as an extension of his publishing business. He is now credited for setting up "the first games company in the U.K.", celebrated as "the father of the British videogames industry" and presented as "a pioneer in affective computing". His first broadcasts of computer game software were made over AM and FM radio. After the release of the Sinclair ZX81, his label published several games for the early home computer market, including three Computer Trade Association award-winners: Pimania (1982), Groucho (1983, a.k.a. My Name Is Uncle Groucho, You Win A Fat Cigar), and the groundbreaking "multi-media" title Deus Ex Machina (1984).

Croucher has championed immersive entertainment throughout his career as director and producer, mixing audio, video, spoken word, real-world locations and computer-generated effects. He is currently Executive Chairman of the Jeeni streamed entertainment channel.

In 2025 his biography was published as Digital Pioneer Spirit by Thomas A. Christie Extremis Publishing, ISBN 9781068231407 whose cover states that Croucher "redefined the digital age" and "blazed a trail as Britain's first multimedia personality."

== Career ==
Croucher has written text books, computer manuals, science fiction, historic novels and comedy, and worked as a journalist, writing regular columns like Without Prejudice, The Rubber Room, and the comedy sci-fi serial Tamara Knight for the ZX Spectrum magazine CRASH in the 1980s, as well as columns for various computer magazines since.

Mel Croucher was the author of Zygote in Computer Shopper every month from Issue 1 in 1988 to the final edition in 2021 and the Mel's World column and the Great Moments In Computing cartoon strip in the same magazine.

In 2010, Feeding Tube Records in the United States released "Pimania: The Music of Mel Croucher", a deluxe vinyl LP album of the music to his games, as well as tracks from other Automata releases. The album came with extensive liner notes by Croucher and Caroline Bren, as well as a large poster featuring selections from the original Automata print campaigns. A six-album retrospective of his music complete works was released in 2017 by The Games Collector.

In 2012, Mel Croucher reformed Automata as Automata Source Ltd. He produced a reimagination of Deus Ex Machina, starring Sir Christopher Lee, released in 2015 as Deus Ex Machina 2, alongside a 30th Anniversary Collector's Edition of the original game including new graphics and a director's commentary. He collaborated with Christopher Lee on several other titles, and their game for children was released as Eggbird in the same year.

Mel Croucher is Executive Chairman of Jeeni, the global streamed music service and artist development platform, which he co-founded with Dr Shena Mitchell in 2017.

== Video games ==
- The Pathfinder Quests (1977-1980)
- Whitbread Quiz Time and the Computer Treasure Hunt (1979)
- The Adventures of Willi Nilli (1981)
- The Portsmouth Tapes (1981)
- In The Best Possible Taste (1981)
- Can Of Worms (1981)
- Love And Death (1982)
- The Bible (1982)
- Pimania (1982)
- Dragon Doodles & Demos (1983)
- Spectrum Spectacular (1983)
- Bunny/ETA (1983) - Croucher wrote the ETA portion of the game.
- Yakzee (1983)
- My Name Is Uncle Groucho, You Win A Fat Cigar (1983)
- Pi-Eyed (1984)
- Olympimania (1984)
- Deus Ex Machina (1984)
- iD (1986)
- Castle Master (1990) story and book of the game
- Deus Ex Machina 2 (2015)
- Deus Ex Machina 30th Anniversary Collector's Edition (2015)
- Eggbird (2015)

== Books and journalism ==
- Namesakes, with Jon Pertwee, (1988) Sphere Books ISBN 0747400237
- Easy AMOS, Europress
- AMOS Professional, Europress
- SAM Coupé User Guide, (1989) Miles Gordon Technology ISBN 1872589006
- Email Direct Marketing, (2000) Institute of Practitioners in Advertising, ISBN 1841160555
- European Computer Trade Yearbook (as Editor)
- Deus Ex Machina - The Best Game You Never Played In Your Life, (2014) Acorn Books, ISBN 1783336935
- Devil's Acre, (2016), Acorn Books ISBN 9781785383748
- Great Moments In Computing (2017), Acorn Books, ISBN 9781785387579
- Last Orders: What You're Worth and Who Benefits When You Die (2017), AG Books, ISBN 1785386417
- Pibolar Disorder (2018), Acorn Books, ISBN 9781785388330
- Short Pants (2018), Acorn Books, ISBN 9781785388309
- Great Moments The Complete Edition (2022), Acorn Books, ISBN 9781789829242
- Mundaneum (2024), Extremis Publishing, ISBN 9781739484569
- Gamers, Ghosts In The Machine (2025), Extremis Publishing, ISBN 9781068231445
- Gamers 2, The Golden Age of Micros (2026), Extremis Publishing, ISBN 9781068231469
- Gamers 3, Play On Demand (2026), Extremis Publishing, ISBN 9781068231490
