= Computer Shopper (British magazine) =

Magazine

- September 1989 issue
- Editor: Madeline Bennett
- Categories: Computer magazine
- Frequency: Monthly
- Circulation: ▼13,081 (2019)
- Founded: 1988
- Final issue Number: November 2020; 395
- Company: Dennis Publishing Ltd.
- Country: United Kingdom
- Based in: London
- Language: British English
- Website: www.computershopper.co.uk
- ISSN: 0955-8578

Computer Shopper was a magazine published monthly between 1988 and 2020 in the UK by Dennis Publishing Ltd. It contained reviews of home computers, consumer technology and software as well as technology-focused news, analysis and feature articles.

The final editorial staff included Madeline Bennett (editor), David Ludlow (contributing editor) and James Archer (reviews editor). Contributors of columns, features and specialist reviews included Mel Croucher, Kay Ewbank, Simon Handby, Ben Pitt and David Crookes.

== Content ==
The first section of the magazine was dedicated to columns, opinions and the Letters pages. This was followed by several news spreads on recent developments in the technology industry.

The magazine claimed the "UK's biggest reviews section" with much of the magazine devoted to product tests of the latest hardware. The reviews section was typically occupied by desktop PCs, laptops, PC components, smartphones, tablets, cameras, displays and printers. This section of new products was typically followed by two or three Group Tests which pitch ten or more similar products against one another to find an overall Best Buy. Previous tests included budget laptops, cloud storage providers, action cameras and gaming PCs.

The Best Buys section of the magazine was updated monthly to reflect the latest products the editorial team has deemed the overall best choice(s) in each area of consumer technology.

Two or three longer-form feature articles followed the reviews section, focusing on the wider world of technology and its applications in various industries. Later features included a history of coding, a guide on how to build racing, flight and train simulators as well as more consumer-focused features on broadband and mobile coverage. A retro section was also included.

The magazine was tailed by several tutorial pages including Advanced Projects, Multimedia Expert, Business Help and Helpfile.

The final page of the magazine was traditionally occupied by the Zygote column and the Great Moments in Computing comic.

== See also ==
- Computer Shopper (American magazine)
