= Computer Shopper (American magazine) =

American computer magazine

- Editor: John A. Burek
- Categories: Computer magazine
- Frequency: Monthly
- Founded: 1979
- Final issue: April 2009
- Company: SX2 Media Labs
- Country: United States
- Based in: Titusville, Florida
- Language: English
- Website: computershopper.com
- ISSN: 0886-0556

Computer Shopper was a monthly consumer computer magazine that was published by SX2 Media Labs. The magazine ceased print publication in April 2009. The website was closed and redirected to the PCMag website in late May 2018.

The magazine gained a reputation for its large size. During the 1990s, it ballooned to over 1,000 pages. Companies such as Micron, Insight Enterprises, Dell, Gateway, MidWest Micro, Northgate, and USA Flex sold computers and parts through ads in Computer Shopper.

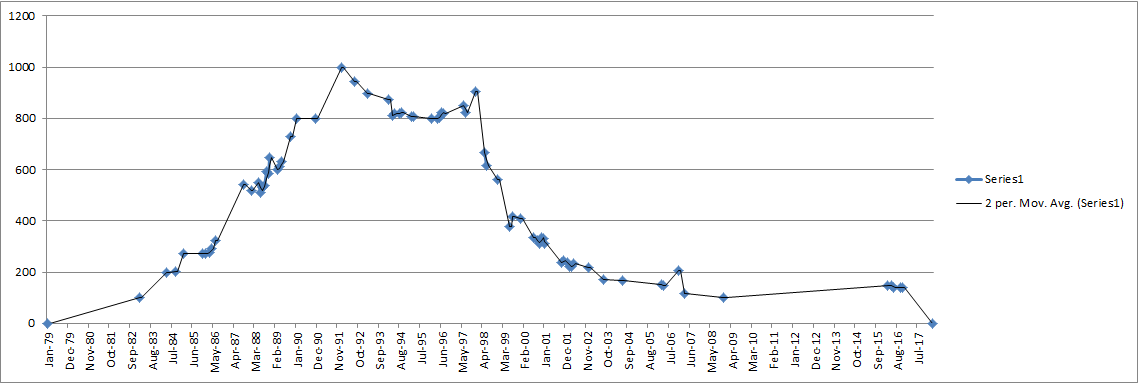
Computer Shopper magazine page count from1979 to 2017

== History ==
Computer Shopper magazine was established in 1979 by Glenn Patch of the Titusville, Florida-based Patch Communications. Patch, the publisher of the photo-equipment magazine Shutterbug Ads, created Computer Shopper in the hopes of applying its formula to a PC-technology magazine.

It began as a tabloid-size publication on yellow newsprint that primarily contained classified advertising and ads for kit computers, parts, and software. This earned the magazine it's nickname as "The Yellow Rag."

Initially, the magazine lacked in editorial content. Stan Veit sent a complaint to the company, ultimately leading to him becoming its first editor-in-chief in 1982. Under Veit, Computer Shopper organized the magazine into sections based on computers (TRS-80, IBM-PC, Apple II, etc.). He also added new editorial content, including columns from Veit and Michael A. Banks. A section in the back of the magazine maintained a list of bulletin board systems.

The magazine expanded into pre-built home computers and white box IBM PC compatibles through the 1980s. 1982 and 1986, Computer Shopper grew 1,723 percent, with sales rising from $328,000 to nearly $6 million. Computer Shopper was first sold on newsstands in August 1984 with 350 tabloid-size pages. By 1988, it had reached 850.

In 1988, Patch entered into a joint venture with Ziff Communications, which gave it a 50% the magazine, along with MacWeek and PC Clone. Veit was named editor-in-chief emeritus.

In 1993, the magazine was sold outright to Ziff Davis. The UK version of Computer Shopper was not included in the deal. In 1996, the magazine sold about 350,000 issues.

It was sold in 2000, along with Ziff-Davis' ZDNet website, to CNET. By 2004, newsstand sales had fallen to below 55,000. CNET sold Computer Shopper to new owners, SX2 Media Labs, in 2006. In April 2009, the print version was discontinued. The business continued as ComputerShopper.com. The website was reacquired by Ziff-Davis in 2012.

== List of editors-in-chief ==
John A. Burek (2008–2017)
