= Brave Wave Productions =

Japan-based record label

- Founded: 2013
- Founder: Mohammed Taher
- Status: Active
- Genre: Video game music, chiptune
- Location: Tokyo, Japan

Brave Wave Productions is a Japanese-based record label founded in 2013. It specializes in video game music artists, often those who were active during the chiptune era of the 1980s and 1990s. One of the stated goals of the label is to bridge the gap between Japanese and Western game music composers. They are known for re-releasing soundtracks of older video games for CD and vinyl, which were often out of print for many years, as well as producing fully original solo albums for some of their signed artists.

== History ==
Brave Wave was founded in 2013 by Mohammed Taher. Taher originally started communicating with musicians while organising a small EP collaboration, but ultimately began to draw the attention of veteran chiptune artists such as Keiji Yamagishi. At the time, Yamagishi had not worked on a video game in ten years. The first results of this were the 2013 album World 1-2, which featured Austin Wintory, Akira Yamaoka and many others. From there, Brave Wave would go on to produce solo albums from these artists, such as Yamagishi's Retro-Active and Manami Matsumae's Three Movements. Five further artists joined the label in 2020 including Shinichi Sakamoto. Later that year the label shifted their entire original catalogue to "pay what you want" on Bandcamp, in the interest of allowing people to relax and listen to the music during the COVID-19 pandemic.

Brave Wave Productions are also known for their restoration work, mastering and preparing the soundtracks of older video games for CD and vinyl re-release. The "Generation Series" includes major license titles such as Street Fighter II, Shovel Knight, and Ninja Gaiden. Their vinyl collection Ninja Gaiden Trilogy marked the first official release of the Ninja Gaiden III soundtrack.

== Notable artists ==
- Chipzel
- Harumi Fujita
- Takahiro Izutani
- Saori Kobayashi
- Manami Matsumae
- Tim McCord
- Yoko Shimomura
- Stemage
- Keiji Yamagishi
- Akari Kaida
- David Wise

== See also ==
- List of record labels
