= Ninja Gaiden II: The Dark Sword of Chaos =

1990 video game

- North American NES box art
- Developer: Tecmo
- Publisher: Tecmo
- Director: Masato Kato
- Programmer: Yoshiaki Inose
- Artist: Masato Kato
- Writers: Sarah H.; Hideo Yoshizawa; Masato Kato
- Composers: Ryuichi Nitta; Mayuko Okamura
- Series: Ninja Gaiden
- Platforms: NES, Arcade, Super NES, MS-DOS, Amiga
- Release: April 6, 1990: NES; JP: April 6, 1990; NA: May 1990; EU: October 27, 1994 Arcade; NA: March 1990 MS-DOS, Amiga; NA: 1991
- Genre: Platform
- Mode: Single-player
- Arcade system: PlayChoice-10

Ninja Gaiden II: The Dark Sword of Chaos, (Note: Known in Japan as Ninja Ryūkenden II: Ankoku no Jashin Ken (忍者龍剣伝II 暗黒の邪神剣; lit. 'Legend of the Ninja Dragon Sword II: The Demonic Sword of Darkness'); alternatively known as Shadow Warriors II: Ninja Gaiden II) known in Europe as Shadow Warriors II: The Dark Sword of Chaos, is a 1990 platform game developed and published by Tecmo for the Nintendo Entertainment System. It is the second instalment in the Ninja Gaiden trilogy for the NES and was released in North America and Japan in 1990, and in Europe in 1994. An arcade version was released by Nintendo for their PlayChoice-10 system in 1990.

The events in Ninja Gaiden II take place one year after the events in the first Ninja Gaiden game. The story involves an evil emperor named Ashtar who, after hearing of Jaquio's defeat, devises a plan to take over the world and engulf it in darkness through an evil sword called the Dark Sword of Chaos. A U.S. Army agent named Robert T. Sturgeon recruits the game's protagonist Ryu Hayabusa and tells him that he is the only person who can stop Ashtar.

Ninja Gaiden II received praise in previews from Electronic Gaming Monthly and Nintendo Power and continued to receive high ratings and coverage, being nominated for several awards from Nintendo Power in 1991. Reviewers said that the game's visuals and controls were improved over its predecessor while maintaining a high level of difficulty for players, but the plot was criticized for being more generic and predictable. The game maintains lasting appeal among players, with one reviewer saying that Ninja Gaiden II is "a challenging experience the likes of which gamers in the 8-bit era lived and died for". It has been rereleased via the Virtual Console, Nintendo Classics and Console Archives services. A sequel, Ninja Gaiden III: The Ancient Ship of Doom, was released in 1991.

== Plot ==
In the Realm of Darkness, Ashtar, the evil lord who controlled Jaquio, is informed of Jaquio's defeat; (Note: As portrayed in Act VI of Ninja Gaiden) he devises a plan to rule over Earth by opening the Gate of Darkness. A U.S. Army Special Intelligence unit member named Robert T. Sturgeon is sent to find Ryu to take out Ashtar. Robert informs Ryu that Irene Lew has been captured and that he must go to the Tower of Lahja to save her. After hopping on a freight train and then battling up the mountain in which the tower lies, he is ambushed by a figure who describes himself as a tribesman of the World of Chaos, led by the Emperor of Darkness Ashtar. After making it to the top of the tower, Ryu finds Irene, who has been captured by Ashtar. Ashtar then blasts Ryu with energy from his own sword; before Ashtar can finish off Ryu, Robert appears and shoots Ashtar in the back, stopping him. Robert orders Ashtar to hand over his sword and give up, but Ashtar escapes with Irene, telling Ryu to follow him into the Maze of Darkness.

After Ashtar escapes into the Maze of Darkness, Robert tells Ryu about Ashtar's plot to take over the world by using the full power of his sword, the Dark Sword of Chaos. After battling through the Maze of Darkness and into the World of Chaos, Ryu hears echoes of Ashtar's plan in the distance. Ryu then catches up with Ashtar. He releases Irene, but immediately after releasing her he stabs her with the Dark Sword. Robert then shows up, only to find out that Irene has been mortally wounded; Ashtar then blasts Robert with energy from his Dark Sword and then challenges Ryu to battle. Ryu defeats Ashtar, and before he dies, he says that the forces of Darkness will soon awaken and implores the forces of Chaos to engulf the world into darkness. While he is saying this, the Dark Sword of Chaos vanishes into thin air. After Ashtar's death, Irene tells Ryu that an evil altar that Ashtar prepared to open the Gate of Darkness must be destroyed. Ryu then leaves Irene behind and tells Robert to take her and leave the World of Chaos.

As Ryu enters the World of Darkness, Irene and Robert, while traveling back, are stopped by a shadowy figure that Irene has seen before. Meanwhile, after defeating Kelbeross whom he noted he fought in his showdown with Jaquio, Ryu finds Robert on the ground and mortally wounded. He tells Ryu that Irene has been captured again and that Ryu must prevent the Gate of Darkness from opening. Robert then tells Ryu to leave him behind while he fends off the demons. Ryu eventually makes it to the evil altar where he finds Irene and the shadowy figure who captured her; the figure reveals himself as Jaquio, who was possessed by the demon after his first battle with Ryu.

Jaquio tells Ryu that he plans to use the Dark Sword of Chaos to exploit Irene's life force as a means to open the Gate of Darkness and summon all the demons, while Ryu awakens them from their sleep. Jaquio then challenges Ryu to a showdown in which Ryu defeats him. Before Ryu and Irene can destroy the evil altar though, Jaquio's blood awakens the Dark Sword, which opens up the Gate of Darkness, shocks Irene and Ryu with its energy. The Demon Jashin reanimates the corpse of Jaquio, turning him into a demonic wall, which Ryu, after borrowing strength from his Dragon Sword, defeats. Jashin is once again sealed away, the Dark Sword then breaks apart, the Gate of Darkness closes and disappears, and Ryu flees with Irene out of the temple just as it collapses. He then begins to mourn for Irene, who is presumed to be dead, when the power of the Dragon Sword revives her. Ryu tells her that the incident is over as the two watch the sun set.

== Gameplay ==
Ninja Gaiden II introduced the ability of Ryu to split his body into multiple forms. Here Ryu's double (the orange ninja) is being used to defeat the boss Naga Sotuva.

As with the previous Ninja Gaiden game, the player controls Ryu Hayabusa through a series of platforming levels called "Acts". Players have the ability to jump and latch on and off walls and ladders. Two new abilities that Ryu can do in Ninja Gaiden II are climbing up and down walls and attacking with "Power Boosting Items" while on walls and ladders. Ryu has a strength meter on top of the screen that decreases whenever he takes damage from enemies. The player loses a life if Ryu's strength meter runs out, Ryu falls off the screen or if the timer runs out; the game ends if players lose all their lives. The player can continue and restart the game from the beginning of the level in which they lost all their lives.

Players dispatch enemies by either thrusting at them with Ryu's Dragon Sword or by defeating them using Power Boosting Items. These special items consume Ryu's "ninja power", also located on the top of the screen. Power Boosting Items include the following: shurikens; "Windmill Throwing Stars" that move back and forth like a boomerang; "The Art of the Fire Wheel" which hurls fireballs diagonally upwards; "Fire Dragon Balls" which hurls fireballs diagonally downwards; and the "Invincible Fire Wheel" that creates a barrier of three fireballs around Ryu, destroying any enemy that touches them. These items can be found in various crystal balls scattered throughout the levels, and they can be switched out by collecting another Power Boosting Item. The amount of ninja power used depends on the type of Power Boosting Item used. At the end of each Act Ryu fights a boss which has its own strength meter, located on the top of the screen. The boss's strength meter decreases every time the player damages it, and the boss is destroyed when the player completely depletes its strength meter.

Along the way, the player can collect items that are found in crystal balls scattered throughout the levels. These items include the following: items that increase Ryu's ninja power; bottles that increase the player's score; "Scrolls of the Spirit of the Dragon" that increase Ryu's maximum ninja power; medicine that partially refills Ryu's strength meter; Power Boosting Items; and 1-ups. Another new feature in Ninja Gaiden II is the ability for Ryu to "split his body" and clone himself when the player collects an orange ninja symbol. Collecting this symbol creates for Ryu an orange shadow of him that follows behind and copies every move Ryu makes, including climbing walls and ladders and attacking enemies. Using this technique, the player can strategically position Ryu and his clones to more easily defeat enemies and bosses.

== Release ==
Electronic Gaming Monthly previewed Ninja Gaiden II in late 1989 and early 1990. The game first appeared in its September–October 1989 issue and again in its November issue; they noted the new levels, power-ups, and an "explosive story that's loaded with twists and turns". In the magazine's January issue, Steve Harris praised the game for its new power-ups, scrolling backgrounds, and more detailed cinematic cutscenes. He said that the game was going to take the series "one step further than before". The game was shown to the public for the time at the Winter 1990 Consumer Electronics Show in Las Vegas, in which Nintendo Power gave "four star ratings for its great cinema scenes and challenge". The same magazine previewed the game in its "Pak Watch" section in their March–April 1990 issue. They said that at first look the game had better cutscenes than the first Ninja Gaiden game, and they noted the great and diverse gameplay and high level of challenge.

Nintendo initially introduced Ninja Gaiden II as an arcade video game for their PlayChoice-10 system at Chicago's American Coin Machine Exposition (ACME) in March 1990, marketed as a sequel to Tecmo's hit Ninja Gaiden arcade game (1988). The NES version was then released in Japan on April 6, 1990, in North America in May 1990, and in Europe on October 27, 1994. Ports were published for the Amiga and MS-DOS by GameTek in 1991. It has been digitally re-released multiple times via the Virtual Console storefront, including in 2007 for the Wii, in 2013 for the Nintendo 3DS, and in 2016 for the Wii U. It was added to the Nintendo Classics service on November 26, 2025. Hamster Corporation re-released the game for the Nintendo Switch 2 as part of their Console Archives series in February 5, 2026; followed by a re-release of the game on PlayStation 5 in February 14 of the same year.

== Reception ==
Reception

Review scores
Publication	Score
AllGame	4/5
Electronic Gaming Monthly	9/10, 9/10, 9/10, 8/10
Famitsu	5/10, 6/10, 8/10, 6/10
GameSpot	7.5/10
IGN	8.5/10
Nintendo Life	8/10
Famicom Hisshobon	3.5/5

Award
Publication	Award
Game Players	Game Player's NES Excellence Award, 1990

After the game's release, it debuted at #4 on Nintendo Power magazine's "Top 30" list for September–October 1990. In March 1991, the game was nominated for the "Nintendo Power Awards '90" in the following categories: "Best Theme & Fun"; "Best Play Control"; "Best Hero" (Ryu Hayabusa); "Best Bad Guy" (Ashtar); and "Best Overall". It did not win any of those categories. In a 1991 issue of Game Players in its list of Annual Awards, the game received the "Game Player's NES Excellence Award" as one of the best NES games of 1990. Electronic Gaming Monthly founder Steve Harris said that the game improved on its predecessor's gameplay, graphics, and cinematic cutscenes; he praised the diverse level environments and the new abilities that Ryu has received, but he noted that some power-ups from the first Ninja Gaiden game were missing in this one. A reviewer under the pseudonym "Sushi-X" echoed Harris's praise but pointed out that some of the bosses in the first game were reused; he added afterwards that "it's still worth the price of admission". Ed Semrad called Ninja Gaiden II one of the best video game sequels to ever be released; he referred to the graphics, difficulty, gameplay, and storyline as "near-perfect", though he pointed out that the game does get very difficult in the latter levels. Martin Alessi called it one of the best NES games ever and one of the best video games of 1990. In the same issue, Ninja Gaiden II was featured on the front cover and was denoted as the "Game-of-the-Month".

In 1997 Nintendo Power listed Ninja Gaiden as the 49th on its "100 Best Games of All Time" list. It was also listed as having one of the best 100 cheat codes of all time, which was pressing a series of buttons on the title screen to enable various sound tests. The same year, Electronic Gaming Monthly listed the NES version as 88th on their "100 Best Games of All Time", saying it was "easily the best" of the three Ninja Gaiden games which had been released at this point, citing its gameplay, storyline, music, and the body-splitting ability. They said they were not including the SNES compilation in the listing because they felt the changes it made to the gameplay and music made the game worse. In 2012 GamesRadar ranked it the 20th best NES game ever made. The staff felt that it was a large improvement over its predecessor due to improved gameplay, audio, visuals, and control.

In a retrospective review, Allgame editor Aaron Kosydar praised the game. He described the graphics in some scenes (such as the train level) as "astonishing for the NES". Kosydar stated that the game was fun, but mild criticism was noted for the difficulty, describing the final boss as "nearly impossible".

Ninja Gaiden II was reviewed again in 2007 when the game was released for the Virtual Console and received some praise as well as criticism from reviewers. Austin Shau from GameSpot compared the game with the first Ninja Gaiden game as examples of "mean-spirited games" on the NES with high, unforgiving difficulty and excellent controls and gameplay. He applauded Tecmo's artistic detail in the cutscenes, saying that it enhances the storyline and offsets the tedious dialogue. He said that the visuals are better than those in the first game with the usage of "dynamic environments" such as speeding trains, and he praised the game's fast-paced sound. He and IGN's Lucas Thomas praised the improvement in the controls from its predecessor, more specifically Ryu's ability to freely climb up and down walls and use special weapons while on the walls. Thomas enjoyed the game's "chief innovation" of Ryu's ability to clone himself and use the clones to take care of enemies – noting that the doubles "make progressing through levels and taking down bosses much easier and quicker". Reviewers said that the game's difficulty remains high as with the previous Ninja Gaiden game. Shau noted that the game is still difficult as was its predecessor but that the sequel is slightly easier. Thomas stated that the sequel is not any easier to beat than its predecessor and that players will still get frustrated, especially with new environmental features such as blowing wind and rain and absolute darkness in which flashes of lightning illuminate the platforms. Thomas's only criticism of the game was that the storyline is not as good as its predecessor, saying that the plot seemed more predictable and that the cutscenes seemed more generic the second time around. He noted the lasting appeal of the game, saying that Ninja Gaiden II is "a challenging experience the likes of which gamers in the 8-bit era lived and died for".
