= Deus Ex Machina (video game) =

1984 video game

- Developer: Automata UK
- Publishers: Automata UK; Electric Dreams
- Designer: Mel Croucher
- Programmer: Andrew Stagg
- Platforms: ZX Spectrum, MSX, Commodore 64, Android, iOS, Ouya, Windows, Linux, Mac OS X
- Release: October 1984: EU: October 1984 (ZX Spectrum); EU: 1985 (MSX); EU: 1986 (C64); WW: January 30, 2015 (Android); WW: February 2, 2015 (iOS); WW: February 14, 2015 (Ouya); WW: February 20, 2015 (Win, Linux, Mac)
- Genres: Art game, music game
- Mode: Single player

Deus Ex Machina is a video game designed and created by Mel Croucher and published by Automata UK for the ZX Spectrum in October 1984 and later converted to MSX and Commodore 64.

The game was the first to be accompanied by a fully synchronised soundtrack which featured narration, celebrity artists and music. The cast included Ian Dury, Jon Pertwee, Donna Bailey, Frankie Howerd, E.P. Thompson, and Croucher (who also composed the music). Andrew Stagg coded the original Spectrum version, and Colin Jones (later known as author/publisher Colin Bradshaw-Jones) was the programmer of the Commodore 64 version.

The game charts the life of a "defect" which has formed in "the machine", from conception, through growth, evolution and eventually death. The progression is loosely based on "The Seven Ages of Man" from the Shakespeare play, As You Like It and includes many quotations and parodies of this. The original game would later be rereleased alongside a sequel/remake in 2015.

== Gameplay ==
Players of the game take control of a defective machine which has taken the form of the human body. The players would experience the different stages of life, all the way from being a cell to being a senile old being. It is considered to be a work of audiovisual entertainment although the game itself does not have sound. It is separated into an audio cassette where the tape needs to be played alongside the game. The length of the audio cassette is 46 minutes which is also the length of the game itself. Although the game could be played without the audio cassette, it would make it easier to understand with the help of the soundtrack. The soundtrack includes songs, musical compositions, and also voices of famous actors. As the game comes with a full transcript of the speech, it could at times be played without audio.

== Reception ==
Deus Ex Machina was the highest new entry, at sixth position in WHSmith's ZX Spectrum Top Ten chart in November 1984, four places above the new entry for Underwurlde, the latest release from Ultimate Play The Game. The following week it fell three places to number nine. It subsequently gained cult status as an underground art game.

== Legacy ==
Croucher retrospectively viewed the game as a disappointment, saying "I should have sold the game at a sensible price. But I wanted to put a lovely poster in it and nice packaging and a double vinyl gatefold" and that as a result the price of £15 compared to the more usual £8 meant that sales were low, and the game only broke even.

In 2010, the game was included as one of the titles in the book 1001 Video Games You Must Play Before You Die. In 2014 Croucher released a book about the game's (and his) history, and the making of the new game, entitled Deus Ex Machina - The Best Game You Never Played in Your Life.

=== Rereleases and sequel ===
A re-imagining of the game went into production in 2010, under the title Deus Ex Machina 2, once again under the design and creation of Croucher and production of Mario Valente. The new cast is led by Sir Christopher Lee as The Programmer, with Chyna Whyne as The Machine, Chris Madin as The Defect, Joaquim de Almeida as the Defect Police, and original Ian Dury session vocals. It was eventually released on 11 March 2015. It marked the final performance of Christopher Lee that was released in his lifetime, being released 4 months prior to his death. Alongside the sequel, a remastered version of the game entitled Deus Ex Machina, Game of the Year, 30th Anniversary Collector's Edition was released for the Android, iOS, Ouya, Microsoft Windows, Linux and Mac OS X. A second remastered version, Deus Ex Machina - The Final Cut, was released in 2016 for Microsoft Windows, Linux and Mac OS X.
