= Automata UK =

British video game company

Automata UK, Ltd.
- Type: Private
- Industry: Video games
- Founded: 1977 in the United Kingdom
- Founder: Mel Croucher, Christian Penfold
- Defunct: 1985
- Fate: Dissolved
- Headquarters: Portsmouth, Hampshire, United Kingdom
- Key people: Mel Croucher, Christian Penfold, Robin Evans (artist), Andrew Stagg (programmer)
- Products: Pimania, My Name Is Uncle Groucho, You Win A Fat Cigar, Automonopoli, Deus Ex Machina

Automata UK was a software house which developed and published ZX Spectrum video games between 1982 and 1985. Significant releases included Pimania (1982), My Name Is Uncle Groucho, You Win A Fat Cigar (1983) and Deus Ex Machina (1984).

== History ==
Automata was established by Mel Croucher on November 19, 1977. In 1979 he was joined by Christian Penfold. The two had previously worked together in radio, producing a show for Independent Radio Authority, which led them to publishing travel guides and produce multimedia entertainments.

Croucher had purchased a ZX-81 and, whilst the two were on location creating a guide for Sealink to the Channel Islands, began to plan out their first mainstream software releases. Automata's first commercial successes were Can of Worms and The Bible. For Pimania (1982), one of Automata's first ZX Spectrum releases, Penfold was highlighted as C&VG's "Designer of the Month".

Automata became known for its support of non-violent game concepts, cartoon-strip adverts and appearances at ZX Microfairs. Penfold and Croucher perceived the effects of middlemen, distributors and retailers on the software industry as damaging. Automata itself was largely a mail-order business, and charged wholesalers the same rate as individual customers.

By June 1985, Automata had ceased publishing after Croucher sold his stake in Automata to Penfold.

The Automata game rights were later sold to Subvert.

In November 2012, Croucher reformed Automata as Automata Source, with leading figures from the video games, online marketing and music industries. He has written a history of the company as an insider's story of the foundation of the video game industry, titled Deus Ex Machina: The Best Game You Never Played In Your Life.

== Piman ==
Automata's mascot was Piman, a pink humanoid with a large nose. He was the protagonist in many of their games, starting with the text adventure Pimania (1982) which was designed by Croucher and Penfold. Artist Gremlin Evans drew the Piman cartoons, which began to feature an extended family of Pi-people such as Morris, Rastapiman and Swettibitz. Many of the Piman games were programmed freelance, arriving as unsolicited tapes, which were then slotted into the Piman storyline.

== Deus Ex Machina ==
Deus Ex Machina was Automata's most ambitious project; an attempt at an "epic computer movie". Published in 1984, it was a multi-stage game based on Shakespeare's "The Seven Ages of Man". It included a synchronised music sound-track with voice-over talent from Ian Dury, Jon Pertwee, Donna Bailey, Frankie Howerd, and Mel Croucher himself. Deus Ex Machina received excellent reviews in the press, coverage in the national media, Croucher was interviewed by Barry Norman and the Sunday Times put it top of its list of games to buy for Christmas. Despite this positive critical response, retailers did not want to stock it, partially due to Automata's policy on charging wholesalers full price for small orders. By February only 5000 copies had been distributed. Due to this, Penfold and Croucher became bitter towards the sales industry:

I am tone-deaf. I can understand the concept but I cannot follow it all. For Mel it was the crescendo of an idea, an emotional achievement. On my side, I have been flattened by the lack of response and sales despite the wonderful things said about it. I sit here and feel heart-broken at the pathetic way the retailers have handled it

— Christian Penfold, Sinclair User

== Releases ==
- Love And Death (1982)
- The Bible (1982)
- Pimania (1982)
- Automonopoli (1983)
- Dragon Doodles & Demos (1983)
- Spectrum Spectacular (1983)
- Bunny/ETA (1983) - Croucher wrote the ETA portion of the game.
- Yakzee (1983)
- My Name Is Uncle Groucho, You Win A Fat Cigar (1983)
- Piballed (1984)
- Crusoe (1984)
- Dartz (1984)
- Pi-Eyed (1984)
- Pi-in-'ere (1984)
- Piromania (1984)
- Olympimania (1984)
- Deus Ex Machina (1984)
