= Hiroshi Miyazaki =

Japanese composer

Hiroshi Miyazaki (宮崎 博) is a Japanese video game music composer, sound designer and musician. Sometimes he was referred to as Matsuri Wakasugi, Miyashiro Sugito (宮代杉人), Hiromiyazaki (ヒロ ミヤザキ), or simply MIYA.

He is best known for his work on Tecmo video games such as the Captain Tsubasa series for the Super Famicom, but has also composed music for the Monster Rancher series and Deception series. Miyazaki composed about a third of the Kagero: Deception II soundtrack overall (with Masaaki Udagawa (宇田川昌昭) and Ayako Toyoda (豊田亜矢子) composing the rest), and also worked on Soumatou (known in North America as Deception III: Dark Delusion).

== Video games ==
- Bad News Baseball (1989) Nintendo Entertainment System
- Tecmo World Wrestling (1989) Nintendo Entertainment System
- Ninja Gaiden II: The Dark Sword of Chaos (1990) Nintendo Entertainment System
- Ninja Gaiden III: The Ancient Ship of Doom (1991) Nintendo Entertainment System
- Final Star Force (1992) Arcade
- Tecmo Super Bowl (1993) Super Nintendo Entertainment System, (1996) PlayStation
- Captain Tsubasa 4: Pro no Rival Tachi (1993) Super Famicom
- Captain Tsubasa 5: Hasha no Shōgō Campione (1994) Super Famicom
- Ninja Gaiden Trilogy (1995) Super Nintendo Entertainment System
- V-Goal Soccer '96 (1996) 3DO
- Kagero: Deception II (1998) PlayStation
- Tecmo World Cup '98 (1998) Arcade
- Deception III: Dark Delusion (1999) PlayStation
- Monster Rancher Hop-A-Bout (2000) PlayStation
- Super Shot Soccer sound (2002) PlayStation
- Monster Rancher 4 (2003) PlayStation 2

== See also ==
- List of video game musicians
