= Monster Rancher DS =

2008 video game

- Developer: Cing
- Publishers: JP: Tecmo; NA: UFO Interactive Games
- Series: Monster Rancher
- Platform: Nintendo DS
- Release: JP: August 7, 2008; NA: August 3, 2010
- Genre: Life simulation
- Modes: Single-player, Multiplayer

Monster Rancher DS (Note: Japanese: モンスターファームDS2: 甦る! マースターブリーダー伝説, Hepburn: Monster Farm DS 2: Yomigaeru! Master Breeder Densetsu; lit. Monster Farm DS2: Revived! Master Breeder Legend) is a life simulation video game developed by Cing and published by UFO Interactive Games for the Nintendo DS. It was released in Japan on August 7, 2008 and in North America on August 3, 2010. The game was not released in Europe.

== Gameplay ==
Two monsters fighting against each other in a tournament

The game, taking place in the BOMBA region, involves raising, fighting, and breeding monsters. The main character is never seen on screen, but always talks to his apprentice, Cleo, directly. The player chooses his actions and choices through menu options.

=== Creating monsters ===
There are two primary methods for creating monsters: drawing pictures in the Magic Field using the touchscreen, and reciting an Incantation using the microphone. Other methods include combining two existing monsters to create a new monster as well as an additional unrevealed method.

New to the combination process is the "-ish" or "modoki" monster, a glitch monster whose purpose is to give you a monster when you attempt combinations that are not in the game, and appear as a light blue untextured version of the normal model, and appear as the last monster in each monster's entries in the monster encyclopedia, using the ???-subtype normally used by special monsters.

=== Fighting monsters ===
The way you make money, and gain ranks, is by having your monster fight in tournaments. In a fight, your monster starts with a fixed amount of guts, which is basically energy to spend on the moves they know. You can control the monster yourself, or let them fight on their own as they do when they get into a battle in the wild.

Moves can be done in one of three ranges. You can move forward or backward on the battlefield to toggle between the ranges. If you get in very close, you can also push the opponent away from you. A major change from the previous games is that you are able to use the touchscreen to move your monster forward or backwards, as well as to order it to attack.

== Development ==
The game was announced on May 23, 2008 and would be released in Japan as Monster Farm DS 2: Yomigaeru! Master Breeder Densetsu. At that time no localization for the first game, Monster Farm DS had been announced for North America. This gave rise to speculation that both games would not be localized in North America at all which would be a first for the series since every past game in the series had been localized with all of the past portable titles: Monster Rancher Advance and Monster Rancher Advance 2 being released in North America. However, on November 10, 2009 this speculation was proven untrue when it was announced that Monster Farm DS 2 would be released in North America as Monster Rancher DS with the first DS game, Monster Farm DS not being localized in favor of its sequel. This announcement came a year after its original Japanese release and came as a surprise to many fans who had lost hope.

== Reception ==
Reception

Aggregate score
Aggregator	Score
Metacritic	58/100

Review scores
Publication	Score
Famitsu	29/40
GameSpot	6/10
IGN	5.5/10
NGamer	59%

The game received "mixed or average reviews" according to the review aggregation website Metacritic. In Japan, Famitsu gave it a score of one six, one seven, and two eights for a total of 29 out of 40.
