= Monster Rancher Battle Card GB =

1999 video game

Monster Rancher Battle Card Game
- Developer: Graphic Research
- Publisher: Tecmo
- Series: Monster Rancher
- Platform: Game Boy Color
- Release: JP: December 24, 1999; NA: April 25, 2000
- Genre: Strategy
- Modes: Single-player, multiplayer

Monster Rancher Battle Card GB, known in Japan as Monster Farm Battle Card GB (モンスターファームバトルカードGB, Monsutā Fāmu Batoru Kādo GB) is a strategy video game developed by Graphic Research and released in 1999 by Tecmo for the Game Boy Color. It is the first game in Tecmo's Monster Rancher Battle Card series, featuring a card game incorporating the popular characters from the Monster Rancher series. It was followed by a 2000 sequel Monster Rancher Battle Card Episode II for the PlayStation which featured additional monsters.

== Gameplay ==
Although the Monster Rancher series is known for the ability to import game content via CDs, Monster Rancher Battle Card GB has no equivalent functionality. Instead, the player takes a short "personality test" to determine his starting deck and then can win additional cards by defeating opponents as well as new monster cards by defeating dungeon bosses. While a code system is also in place, only a select few cards catering to a single monster along with some general support can be obtained through this method.

Each player's deck consists of three monster cards and an additional fifty attack/defense/support cards. Monster cards start in play, have HP, and a type (either ground or air). Attack are always specific to one monster breed, defense cards can be specific to one monster breed, and support cards. To use these cards, a player usually has to pay an activation cost in the form of a resource called "guts".

The actual card game with both players, each with their three monsters on the field, flipping a coin to determine which player has the choice of going first or second. Each player then draws five cards. A player's turn consists of (in the following order):
A) A draw phase: The active player draws until he has five cards in hand)
B) A general phase: The active player can attack or use support cards. At this time the defending player can use defense cards to counter an opponent's attack)
C) The discard phase: The active player can discard any number of cards from their hand. Those discarded cards become "guts", which can be used to pay for attacks.

A monster is killed when its HP reaches 0. A player loses when they have no monsters remaining or when they are unable to draw a card.

The game consists of a character traveling to dungeons to obtain sacred stones needed to generate new monster cards and fighting ranked battles to increase their level to unlock new dungeons. Each dungeon contains multiple randomly generated floors, invisible guardians that automatically challenge the player, normal NPCs that the player can challenge, and a boss. After achieving the maximum rank and completing all the dungeons, a new dungeon is unlocked. After defeating the new surgeon's boss, players have the option of starting a new game plus. During a new game plus, the player's normal deck is locked until they reaches the final dungeon. There issues no actual story or objectives beyond unlocking content.

== Reception ==
Reception

Review scores
Publication	Score
AllGame	3/5
Famitsu	22/40
Game Informer	6.75/10
IGN	7/10
Nintendo Power	6.4/10

In Japan, Famitsu gave it a score of 22 out of 40. IGN said: "If you like the card battle genre, Monster Rancher is a good one."
