= Deception IV: Blood Ties =

2014 video game

Deception IV
- Developer: Tecmo Koei
- Publisher: Tecmo Koei
- Directors: Makoto Shibata; Masaki Shibuya
- Producer: Keisuke Kikuchi
- Designers: Tsuyoshi Iuchi; Toshiaki Kubota
- Series: Deception
- Platforms: PlayStation 3 PlayStation Vita; PlayStation 4
- Release: Blood Ties: JP: 27 February 2014; NA: 25 March 2014; EU: 28 March 2014; The Nightmare Princess: JP: March 26, 2015; NA: July 14, 2015; EU: July 17, 2015
- Genres: Action role-playing, Tactical role-playing game
- Mode: Single-player

Deception IV: Blood Ties, known in Japan as Kagero: Dark Side Princess (影牢 ダークサイド・プリンセス), is a strategy game for the PlayStation Vita and PlayStation 3 by Tecmo Koei, and a sequel to Kagero II: Dark Illusion within the Deception series. The game was released in 2014 for Japan on 27 February, and the western localization of the game was released in North America on 25 March and Europe on 28 March.

An expanded version titled Deception IV: The Nightmare Princess, known in Japan as Kagero: Another Princess (影牢 ～もう1人のプリンセス～), was released in Japan on March 26, 2015 for PlayStation 4, PlayStation 3, and PlayStation Vita. The Nightmare Princess is the first Deception game to be released on the PlayStation 4; it was also made available in digital format on the PlayStation 3 and PlayStation Vita on the same date. It was released in North America on July 14 and in Europe on July 17.

== Gameplay ==
In-game screenshot demonstrating the use of traps against enemy units

The game is a revisit of Tecmo's 1996 PlayStation game Tecmo's Deception. As a game focused on strategy, the player aims to defeat enemies by luring them into a wide variety of traps. The aim of the game is to prevent the enemy from reaching the player, exclusively using traps. Players can choose to utilise a variety of different traps, including rolling boulders, electrocution, fire, spring boards, spiked walls, human cannons, falling bathtubs, banana peels, an iron maiden, and locomotives. Proper timing of traps is an important aspect of the gameplay, as the player is also able to fall victim to their own traps.

Players are able to set their trap combinations within three methods, namely Brutality, Magnificence, or Humiliation; each different type used will grant different rewards from the devil's three servants. Effective utilisation of the environment also allows the player to deal additional damage to foes. The PlayStation Vita version of the game allows players to select and activate traps using the touch screen.

The Nightmare Princess introduces the new character Velguirie, who is able to set traps as well as directly attack enemies by kicking. The player can deal damage to an enemy by stomping on them after they have fallen to the ground, or kick them into traps. The main feature of the game is called the Quest Mode, which features 100 new quests to complete. In it, the player plays as Velguirie, and is able to obtain new traps and abilities. The game will also include an option titled Deception Studio, which allows players to create their own characters, enemies, and missions. Parts for Deception Studio can be acquired by playing Quest Mode.

== Plot ==
The game follows the main character Laegrinna, the devil's daughter who was created from a fragment of his soul. Three thousand years ago, the devil was defeated by twelve warriors known as the Saints where they sealed him using the Holy Verses. After the devil's imprisonment, the Verses were divided into 12 items and given to the Saints and their descendants. In the present, Laegrinna is tasked by her father to find the Holy Verses from the descendants of the Saints so the seal imprisoning her father can be broken. Helping in her mission are Caelea, Veruza and Lilia, daemons and servants of her father.

=== Characters ===
Some of the characters appear as enemies at first in the quest mode, but are playable after the player completes certain quests.

- Velguirie (ヴァルギリエ, Varugirie) is the second daughter of the devil and the protagonist of the game. She's described as being the titular "Nightmare Princess" that humans will see in their dreams. She has lost her original powers due to a long sleep. She works with her Automaton Ephemera, who's taught her all the necessary steps and knowledge about how to revive evil.
- Laegrinna (レグリナ, Regurina) is the first daughter of the devil and first appeared in Blood Ties. She has very light skin and snow white hair. In comparison to her younger sister Velguirie, Laegrinna does not physically hit her victims but disposes of them with traps. She's described as the "Dark Side Princess" for her origins.
- Allura (アリシア, Arishia) is the princess of Fronenberg and first appeared in Trapt. She was wrongly accused of murdering the king and branded as a traitor by her stepmother Catalina, and forced to have a branded tattoo on her arm; hence, she's described as the "Branded Princess".
- Reina (レイナ) is a girl from Burganfada and first appeared in Deception III: Dark Delusion. She was kidnapped by an assassin named Miguel, after her family was murdered at her 17th birthday, and was sent to Alendar. The king of Alendar, king Federick, sent Reina to Hades Jail, where a boy named Marco gave her the power to use traps so that she would not be harmed, but in exchange, she led a cursed life. She's described as the "Tragic Princess" for her personal tragic history and must kill humans in order to survive as such.
- Millennia (ミレニア, Mirenia) first appeared in Kagero: Deception II. As a child she wandered into a mansion, chasing an orb of light that made her feel happy. Over the years of being in the mansion, she was trained in the ways of using traps by a Timenoid called Yocal. She's described as the "Clockwork Princess" for her great skills of chaining the traps.

== Development and release ==
The game was announced at the SCEJ Press Conference in September 2013 prior to the Tokyo Game Show, and intended for a 2014 release in Japan, North America and Europe.

Deception IV: Blood Ties was the first physical PS3 game in North America that changed the top spine insert to blue from the traditional black design on the box art as well as the symbol surface on the disc.

Tecmo Koei unveiled Deception IV: The Nightmare Princess for PlayStation 4, PlayStation 3, and PlayStation Vita in an issue of the Famitsu magazine on December 12, 2014. At the time of the announcement, development was reported to be 50% complete. Players that pre-ordered the Japanese version of Deception IV: The Nightmare Princess could receive the 'Golden Toilet' trap, a golden version of one of the new traps in the game. Players that buy the treasure box edition of the game could receive three exclusive traps.

== Reception ==
Reception

Aggregate score
| Aggregator | Score |
|---|---|
| Metacritic | PS3: 70/100; VITA: 67/100; PS4: 69/100; VITA (The Nightmare Princess): 73/100 |

Review scores
| Publication | Score |
|---|---|
| Destructoid | (PS3) 8.5/10 |
| Famitsu | Blood Ties: 34/40; The Nightmare Princess: 33/40 |
| Game Informer | (VITA) 6.75/10 |
| GameRevolution | (PS3) 5/10 |
| GamesRadar+ | (VITA) 3.5/5 |
| Hardcore Gamer | (VITA) 3.5/5 |
| Pocket Gamer | (VITA) 4/5 |
| Push Square | (VITA) 6/10 |
| USgamer | (PS3) 3/5 |
| VentureBeat | (VITA) 50/100 |

During the first week of release in Japan, the PS3 version sold 23,254 physical retail copies, whilst the PS Vita version sold 19,322 physical retail copies. Famitsu gave both the PS3 and Vita versions of the game a review score of 34/40.

The Nightmare Princess has a score of 69/100 on Metacritic. Destructoid gave the game an 8/10 review score, stating that the game is memorable and recommendable.
