= Monster Rancher EVO =

2005 video game

- North American box art
- Developer: Tecmo
- Publisher: Tecmo
- Series: Monster Rancher
- Platform: PlayStation 2
- Release: JP: December 8, 2005; NA: April 11, 2006
- Genres: Life simulation, role-playing video game
- Modes: Single-player, multiplayer

Monster Rancher EVO (Monster Farm 5: Circus Caravan (モンスターファーム5: サーカス キャラバン, Monsutā Fāmu Faibu: Sākasu Kyaraban) in Japan) is a PlayStation 2 game in the Monster Rancher series. It was released in Japan on December 8, 2005, and in North America on April 11, 2006. The game was not released in PAL territories.

== Gameplay ==
Monster Rancher EVO delves more into the RPG genre than previous installments in the series. Gamers play the role of Julio, a circus performer who aspires to be a world class monster breeder. Players must meet with the circus ringleader on a weekly basis to plan out the next week's course of action: schedule in circus performances, adventuring and training for their monsters.

Although the series has taken a new direction, Monster Rancher EVO features many of the themes of past games. Monster generation (using CD/DVDs, an in-game item, or with other monsters) is done with a female shaman named Nayuta who also plays the role of heroine. Rather than using a shrine to unlock your disks, Nayuta awakens them using a magical monster rebirth dance. She can reseal them in disc stones as well, which replaces the freeze function from older games. While this does not affect monster health it does affect loyalty; over-use can lead to monsters rebelling in the middle of a show.

There is a Monster Market where players can pick up disc stones for free, in case they lack a large collection of their own disks. Monsters can be combined like previous games, but the parent monsters are not consumed, and are put back in Julio's inventory afterwards. Many monster species make a return, with a few new additions as well, for a total of 25 main breeds. Monsters put on shows using training gadgets, and if the audience enjoys the show, they will throw money at the stage.

Exploration, similar to that of Monster Rancher 4, involves the character going out into the field with their monster(s), and defeating stray monsters and a chapter boss to gain anima points, used to gain new monster skills or perform 'union attacks'.

== Graphics ==
Monster Rancher EVO's artwork style is a great deal more animated and realistic than its predecessors. Characters take on a much more realistic physique and appear quite natural, rather than cartoony. Monsters in EVO share most of their same designs as those from Monster Rancher 4. They are more smoothly animated, helping to immerse the player fully into the game.

== Story ==
The Orcoro Circus is a band of people who have come together to bring joy to people's faces. Julio, a young boy in the Orcoro circus, wants to be a professional and famous Monster Breeder. One day after a performance a mysterious beautiful girl with special powers by the name of Nayuta came to force her way into the circus troop.

NPC interaction is the key to moving forward in the story. Each of the seven towns that you visit has its own problems. In each village there is a guild. At the guild Julio accepts missions from the guildmaster that have been set by the villagers. The rewards for missions are gold, items, and rare monsters.

== Reception ==
Reception

Aggregate score
Aggregator	Score
Metacritic	58/100

Review scores
Publication	Score
Eurogamer	2/10
Famitsu	29/40
Game Informer	8/10
GameSpot	6.4/10
GameSpy	3.5/5
IGN	6.5/10
Official U.S. PlayStation Magazine	2.5/5
Detroit Free Press	1/4

The game received "mixed" reviews according to the review aggregation website Metacritic. In Japan, Famitsu gave it a score of one seven, one eight, and two sevens for a total of 29 out of 40.

== OVA tie-in ==
In Japan, an Original Video Animation tie-in to the game, entitled Monster Farm 5: Circus Caravan Original Animation- Kessei!! Orcoro Circus (モンスターファーム5 サーカスキャラバン オリジナルアニメーション 「結成!!オルコロサーカス」, Monsutā Fāmu Faibu Sākasu Kyaraban Orijinaru Animēshon "Kessei!! Orukoro Sākasu) was released.
