= Monster Rancher Battle Card Episode II =

2000 video game

- Developer: Tecmo
- Publisher: Tecmo
- Series: Monster Rancher
- Platform: PlayStation
- Release: JP: March 23, 2000; NA: July 31, 2000
- Genre: Strategy
- Modes: Single-player, multiplayer

Monster Rancher Battle Card Episode II, known in Japan as Monster Farm Battle Card (モンスターファームバトルカード, Monsutā Fāmu Batoru Kādo), is a strategy video game developed and published by Tecmo for PlayStation in 2000. It is the second and last game in Tecmo's Monster Rancher Battle Card series, featuring a card game incorporating the popular characters from the Monster Rancher series.

== Reception ==
Reception

Aggregate score
Aggregator	Score
GameRankings	66%

Review scores
Publication	Score
AllGame	2/5
Electronic Gaming Monthly	6.5/10 (Note: Three critics of Electronic Gaming Monthly gave the game each a score of 6.5/10, 6/10, and 7/10.)
EP Daily	5/10
Famitsu	27/40
GameFan	(JP) 87% (US) 80%
GameRevolution	B−
GameSpot	5.9/10
IGN	5.5/10
Next Generation	2/5

The game received average reviews according to the review aggregation website GameRankings. Greg Orlando of NextGen said, "Although a variant on [Monster Rancher and Monster Rancher 2], Monster Rancher Battle Card [Episode II] holds none of their whimsical fun." In Japan, Famitsu gave it a score of 27 out of 40.

The D-Pad Destroyer of GamePro said of the game, "Fans of the Monster Rancher cartoon series and PlayStation owners dying for a video card game would do well to pick up Battle Card. It's a harmless, fun card battle that requires strategy, quick thinking, and an inexhaustible appetite for cute gladiators doing what they do best - kicking ass." (Note: GamePro gave the game 3.5 for graphics, and 4/5 scores for sound, control, and fun factor in one review.) Bro Buzz said that the game "gets some juice from the cool, if bizarre-looking, combatants and some basic-but-action-packed animation that illustrates the various cards. The lively music makes for a credible effort to party, too, although there's just too much boring dialogue in between cards. If you're game for a change o' pace or a strategy challenge, you might just find them in these cards." (Note: GamePro gave the game two 3.5/5 scores for graphics and control, 3/5 for sound, and 4/5 for fun factor in another review.)
