= Kagerō =

Kagerō (かげろう or カゲロウ), also spelled Kagerou, is the Japanese word for "heat haze" (陽炎) or "mayfly" (蜉蝣 or 蜻蛉), and may refer to:

== Video games ==
- The Japanese Kagero video game series (影牢) translated as shadow dungeon, also knowns as the Deception series outside of Japan and Korea.
  - Kagero: Deception II, a video game in the Deception series
  - Kagero II: Dark Illusion, its sequel, released in English as Trapt

== Ships ==
- Kagerō-class destroyer, a class of vessels in the Imperial Japanese Navy
- Japanese destroyer Kagerō, two destroyers of the Imperial Japanese Navy

== Films ==
- Heat Wave Island, a 1969 film directed by Kaneto Shindo
- Kagero-za, a 1981 film by Seijun Suzuki
- Kagero, a 1991 film directed by Hideo Gosha

== Songs ==
- "Kagerō", 1972 song by Japanese singer-songwriter Sachiko Kanenobu from the album Misora
- "Kagerō", 2004 single by Japanese rock band Fujifabric
- "Kagerou" (Buck-Tick song), 2006 single by Japanese band Buck-Tick
- "Kagerō" (Scandal song), 2008 single by Japanese band Scandal
- "Kagerou", a song by Babymetal from the album Metal Galaxy

== Fictional characters ==
- Kagerou (Basilisk), a fictional character from Basilisk: The Kouga Ninja Scrolls
- Kagero, a fictional character from Ninja Scroll
- Kagero Imaizumi, a character in Double Dealing Character from Touhou Project
- Kageromaru, a fictional character from InuYasha
- Kagerō Shokiin, a fictional character from Inu x Boku SS
- Kagero, a fictional character from the video game Fire Emblem Fates
- Kagero, a fictional character from Brave Police J-Decker
- Kagero Donne, a fictional character from Scarlet Nexus
- Kagero, a fictional character from Kamen Rider Revice

== Others ==
- Kagerou (band), a Japanese rock band
- Kagerou, a novel by Hiro Mizushima
- Kagerou, an organization in the manga Usogui

== See also ==
- Kagerō Nikki
- Kagerou Project, a multi-media project based on a Vocaloid song series
