= Monster Rancher Explorer =

2000 video game

- Developer: Graphic Research
- Publisher: Tecmo
- Series: Solomon's Key; Monster Rancher
- Platform: Game Boy Color
- Release: JP: September 29, 2000; NA: October 24, 2000
- Genre: Puzzle
- Mode: Single-player

Monster Rancher Explorer (known as Solomon (ソロモン, Soromon) in Japan) is a 2000 puzzle game developed by Graphic Research and published by Tecmo for the Game Boy Color. It features the same gameplay elements as Solomon's Key but includes Monster Rancher characters.

== Gameplay ==
The player controls Cox, who must navigate through a series of levels in a tower. In certain levels the player can unlock a bonus round, where they can capture a monster to aid them in the game.

== Reception ==
Reception

Aggregate score
Aggregator	Score
GameRankings	69%

Review scores
Publication	Score
Electronic Gaming Monthly	5.5/10
Famitsu	25/40
Game Informer	7.5/10
IGN	8/10
Nintendo Power	3.5/5

The game received "average" reviews according to the review aggregation website GameRankings. In Japan, Famitsu gave it a score of 25 out of 40.
