= Monster Rancher Advance 2 =

2002 video game

- Developer: Tecmo
- Publisher: Tecmo
- Series: Monster Rancher
- Platform: Game Boy Advance
- Release: JP: October 25, 2002; NA: November 18, 2002
- Genre: Life simulation
- Modes: Single-player, multiplayer

Monster Rancher Advance 2 (known in Japan as Monster Farm Advance 2 (モンスターファーム アドバンス 2, Monsutā Fāmu Adobansu Tsū)) is the second of the Monster Rancher games to be released on Game Boy Advance. It is the sequel to Monster Rancher Advance.

== Gameplay ==
Gameplay in Monster Rancher Advance 2 involves the creating, training, and fighting of monsters much like previous games in the Monster Rancher series. Like the first Monster Rancher Advance, the player generates monsters by inputting key phrases. This is unlike the rest of the series on disk based video game systems, in which they generate monsters by inserting readable CDs, or DVDs.

The player is also able to create a variety of monsters by combining two different monsters. The new monster will show qualities of both parents.

== Reception ==
Reception

Aggregate score
Aggregator	Score
Metacritic	79/100

Review scores
Publication	Score
Game Informer	8.5/10
GamePro	4/5
GameSpy	4/5
Nintendo Power	3.5/5

The game received "generally favorable reviews", more so than the original Monster Rancher Advance, according to the review aggregation website Metacritic.
