= Solomon's Key =

1986 video game

- North American NES box art
- Developer: Tecmo (Note: Home computer versions developed by Probe Software; Master System version developed by Aisystem Tokyo; PC Engine version developed by Pack-In-Video; Game Boy version developed by Graphic Research.)
- Publishers: Tecmo; Home computers U.S. Gold
- Designer: Michitaka Tsuruta
- Platform: Arcade: NES, Commodore 64, Amstrad CPC, ZX Spectrum, Atari ST, Master System, IBM PC, PC Engine, Famicom Disk System, Game Boy
- Release: July 1986: Arcade; JP: July 1986; NA: February 1987 NES; JP: July 30, 1986; NA: July 1987; EU: March 30, 1990 Atari ST, C64, CPC, ZX Spectrum; EU: 1987 Master System; JP: April 17, 1988 IBM PC; EU: 1988 PC Engine; JP: December 14, 1990 Famicom Disk System; JP: January 25, 1991 Game Boy; JP: April 5, 1991; NA: April 1991; EU: 1991
- Genre: Puzzle
- Mode: Single-player

Solomon's Key (Note: Japanese: ソロモンの鍵, Hepburn: Soromon no Kagi) is a 1986 puzzle video game developed and published by Tecmo for arcades. It was ported to multiple systems, including the Nintendo Entertainment System and Commodore 64. The PC Engine version was known as Zipang and the Game Boy version as Solomon's Club. A prequel, Solomon's Key 2, was released in 1992 for the NES. The NES version of the game was also released in emulated form on Virtual Console for the Wii in 2006, Nintendo 3DS and Wii U in 2013 and later to the Nintendo Classics service in 2018.

== Gameplay ==
Arcade gameplay

The player, controlling a sorcerer known only as Dana, must overcome unlimited enemy spawning, challenging level designs, a countdown timer, instant death from any physical contact with enemies, and limited ways to dispatch enemies.

Dana is sent to retrieve Solomon's Key to restore the world to light from demons that were accidentally released. The object of the game is to advance through the 50 rooms of "Constellation Space" by acquiring a key to the door that leads to the next room before a timer runs out. The game incorporates elements of the platform shooter genre. Dana can run, jump, create or destroy orange blocks adjacent to him, and cast fireballs to destroy demons. The orange blocks can also be destroyed by hitting them with the character's head twice. Along the way Dana can acquire items to upgrade his firepower and extra lives, as well as items that award bonus points and unlock hidden rooms. With certain items, Dana must make, then break blocks (sometimes in a certain manner) to make these appear.

In the NES version, a "GDV" (Game Deviation Value) score also appears at the game over screen. The score uses a weighted composite of several factors (like levels completed, items found, time and points) which gives the player a good idea of how well the last game was played. The higher the GDV, the better the game.

Solomon's Key has many hidden items and secret levels that are hard to find which enhances the reward for playing. The ending slightly changes depending on which secret levels, if any, the player finds and completes.

=== Levels ===
For the NES version there are 64 levels in total, of which 15 are secret and one is the final level. The main 48 levels are divided into groups of 4 with one group for each of the 12 Zodiac constellation (in order, Aries, Taurus. Gemini, Cancer, Leo, Virgo, Libra, Scorpio, Sagittarius, Capricorn, Aquarius and Pisces). The final level is called Solomon's room. Each constellation has a secret bonus room which can only be accessed by finding a seal for the constellation in the last room of the group. The other three levels are Page of Time, Page of Space and the Princess Room, which occur only if the player has acquired the hidden Seals of Solomon.

== Development ==
Solomon's Key was designed by Michitaka Tsuruta, who took inspiration from Lode Runner and added the ability to both destroy and create tiles. The initial game design leaned towards being more of an action title until Tsuruta's boss at Tecmo, Kazutoshi Ueda, suggested it incorporate puzzle elements. Tsuruta took inspiration from Greek mythology as well as the film Jason and the Argonauts for the visual aesthetic of the game. The title of the game itself came from the sales manager, Harano, after one of the developers explained that the star-like symbol throughout the levels was the seal of Solomon and that there was a book called the Key of Solomon. Harano stated that he liked it, at which point it got its title.

== Ports ==
In 1988, a port of the NES Solomon's Key was released for the Master System in Japan.

In 1990, Pack-In-Video converted the game for the PC Engine under the title Zipang, with the art redone to make it a tie-in with the movie of the same name.

In April 1991, a Game Boy version was released under the title Solomon's Club. It was developed by Graphic Research.

The NES version of the game was released for the Wii Virtual Console on November 19, 2006, in North America and on December 15 in Europe and Australia. A "reverse engineered" port from the Atari ST version was released for the Commodore Amiga in 2013. Later, it was also released on the Nintendo 3DS and Wii U Virtual Console in 2013. It was added to the Nintendo Switch Online NES library on October 10, 2018.

The arcade version of the game was released for PlayStation 4 in September 2014 for Japan, and September 2015 for North America, by Hamster Corporation as part of the Arcade Archives series. The game was re-released for the Nintendo Switch, worldwide, in June 2019.

== Reception ==
In Japan, Game Machine listed Solomon's Key as the 18th most successful table arcade unit of August 1986. Solomon's Key sold 300,000 copies in Japan.

== Legacy ==
In 1992, a prequel was released for the NES named Solomon's Key 2 (called Fire 'n Ice in North America).

Monster Rancher Explorer (Solomon in Japan), also released by Tecmo, features the same gameplay but with Monster Rancher characters.
