= Monster Rancher (video game) =

1997 video game

- Developers: Tecmo; Koei Tecmo (1+2)
- Publishers: Tecmo; Koei Tecmo (1+2)
- Series: Monster Rancher
- Platforms: PlayStation; Android; iOS; Nintendo Switch; Microsoft Windows
- Release: July 24, 1997: PlayStation; JP: July 24, 1997; NA: November 15, 1997 Android; JP: November 28, 2019 iOS; JP: November 28, 2019; WW: December 9, 2021 Switch; JP: December 19, 2019; WW: December 9, 2021 Windows; WW: December 9, 2021
- Genre: Life simulation game
- Modes: Single-player, multiplayer

Monster Rancher, known in Japan as Monster Farm (モンスターファーム, Monsutā Fāmu), is a 1997 life simulation role-playing video game developed and published by Tecmo for the PlayStation. It is the first game in the Monster Rancher series.

Monster Rancher was a critical and commercial success, garnering praise for its unique and addictive gameplay. A port of the game was released in Japan for Android and iOS on November 28, 2019, and for Nintendo Switch on December 19, 2019. An updated version for iOS, Nintendo Switch and Microsoft Windows was released by Tecmo's successor Koei Tecmo worldwide on December 9, 2021 as part of the compilation titled Monster Rancher 1 & 2 DX along with Monster Rancher 2.

== Gameplay ==
Although it is possible to acquire a monster in-game, the series is known for the ability to acquire new monsters using Compact Discs (CDs), including PlayStation game discs. Players can use any readable CD, and the game creates a monster using the CD's metadata. Certain CDs would result in unique monsters; for example, Tecmo's Deception: Invitation to Darkness gives the player Ardebaran, a villain from that game, and some Christmas music albums will give the player a monster of type "Santa". The Windows, Switch, and Android/iOS versions retain the basic gameplay and content of the original, but do not support CD playback; the monsters-from-CD feature is emulated by allowing players to look up CDs from a custom database.

Once the player has two or more monsters in reserve, they can be combined, creating a new monster with traits of both 'parents'. There are twelve basic types of monsters that can be combined, as well as eight special types players can receive as rewards by completing tasks or inserting a CD into the PlayStation. The common types are Dinos, Golems, Suezos, Hares, Tigers, Galis, Monols, Worms, Nagas, Jells, Pixies, and Plants. The rare types are Dragons, Magics, Apes, Ghosts, Hengers, Doodles, Nyas, and Disks. Monsters can be combined to create a new monster with a main type and a sub-type which are determined randomly.

The monsters can then be raised to fight other monsters. There are six stats that determine how the monster does in battle: Power fuels physical attacks, Intelligence fuels and defends against energy attacks, Life determines monster's hit points, Skill affects accuracy, Speed helps evade opponents' attacks, and Defense reduces damage received from physical attacks. Monsters train either by doing chores nearby, or can be sent to be trained by experts, where they have the chance to gain new attack techniques. It is possible to increase some of the monster's stats with food or vitamins, but vitamins comes at a price of decreasing one stat as well as shorting the life span dramatically.

Currency can be used to purchase items in the game, earned by winning monster fighting tournaments. The game can end if the player runs out of currency to manage the monster.

The primary way to advance through the game is through monster fighting tournaments. While in battle, each monster has attacks available to it, some moves are only available at close range, others from a distance. Players cannot control the monster directly in a fight, but can call for their monster to stay away or close in, and attack with whichever move is available at the current range.

== Reception ==
Reception

Aggregate score
Aggregator	Score
Metacritic	86/100

Review scores
Publication	Score
AllGame	4.5/5
Electronic Gaming Monthly	8/10 (Note: In Electronic Gaming Monthly's review of the PlayStation version, two critics gave it each a score of 8/10, one gave it 7.5/10 and the other gave it 8.5/10.)
Famitsu	31/40
Game Informer	9/10
GameFan	91% (Note: Three critics of GameFan gave the PlayStation version each a score of 95, 93, and 85.)
GameSpot	8.1/10
IGN	9/10
Next Generation	5/5
Official U.S. PlayStation Magazine	3.5/5
PlayStation: The Official Magazine	4.5/5

Monster Rancher was met with highly positive reviews. It holds an 86/100 score based on five reviews according to the review aggregation website Metacritic. Critics almost universally commented on its striking originality. IGN summed it up as "an incredibly original title that also happens to be a barrel of fun." Next Generation called it "an addictive yet time-consuming title that deserves to attract a whole new and greatful [sic] audience to the narrow niche of life sim gaming."

The strongest praises often went to the huge variety of monsters that can be created. Ken "Sushi-X" Williams of Electronic Gaming Monthly, for instance, stated, "Not only did every CD I tried produce a unique monster, each one had different strengths and weaknesses, thus a completely different challenge each time." He and Next Generation both noted that the ability to breed monsters adds still further to the possibilities and replay value.

GamePro was one of the few publications to give the game a negative review. While expressing respect for its uniqueness, the reviewer felt that the game's emphasis on thought and decision-making rather than fast button pressing make it unappealing, commenting that "the simple menu-driven gameplay, which offers just a few button presses, definitely won't jack your adrenaline." (Note: GamePro gave the PlayStation version two 3.5/5 scores for graphics and fun factor, 2.5/5 for sound, and 3/5 for control.) Jeff Gerstmann, reviewing the game for GameSpot, agreed that Monster Rancher would not appeal to those who crave action, but said the gameplay is hugely engrossing and addictive for the more patient gamer. One of Williams' co-reviewers, Joe Fielder, similarly described it as "a title that can devour hours almost imperceptibly." [emphasis in original]

Electronic Gaming Monthly named Monster Rancher runner-up for "Most Original Game of the Year" (behind PaRappa the Rapper) at their 1997 Editors' Choice Awards.

The game was a hit in Japan, with domestic sales above 500,000 units by early December 1997. At the time, GameSpot reported that it was "enjoying brisk sales" in the U.S. as well. By 1999, the game sold 1 million units worldwide.
