= MR3 =

MR3 or MR-3 may refer to:

- MegaRace 3, a 2002 video game
- Mercury-Redstone 3, the first American human spaceflight
- Monster Rancher 3, a 2001 video game
- MR3 road, a major highway of Eswatini
