= Solomon's Key 2 =

1992 video game

- European cover art
- Developer: Tecmo
- Publisher: Tecmo
- Director: M. Akama
- Designer: Michitaka Tsuruta
- Artist: Green Peace
- Composer: Ryuichi Nitta
- Platform: Nintendo Entertainment System
- Release: JP: January 24, 1992; NA: March 1993; EU: March 18, 1993
- Genre: Puzzle
- Mode: Single-player

Solomon's Key 2, (Note: Japanese: ソロモンの鍵２ ～クールミン島救出作戦～, Hepburn: Soromon no kagi 2 Ku-Rumintō kyūshutsu sakusen; lit. Solomon's Key 2: Coolmint Island Rescue Operation) known as Fire 'n Ice in North America, is a puzzle video game released by Tecmo for the Nintendo Entertainment System. It is a prequel to 1986's Solomon's Key, and was released in Japan in January 1992, followed by North America and Europe in March 1993. The game was re-released as part of the Nintendo Classics service for the Nintendo Switch in February 2021.

== Gameplay ==
Game screenshot

The game's plot takes place before the original Solomon's Key, and is framed as a story being told by an elderly woman to her grandchildren. The story takes place on Coolmint Island, an island made of ice and home to the winter fairies. When the evil wizard Druidle begins sending flame monsters to attack and melt the island, the queen of the fairies summons the apprentice wizard Dana to defend them, granting him the use of ice magic to help extinguish the flame monsters.

In each stage, players control Dana and attempt to put out all the fires. The flames are extinguished by sliding an ice block into them or by dropping one on top of them from above. Dana's moveset includes the abilities to walk left and right across level ground. He can also climb on top of a solid block to his left or right, provided it is only one block tall and there is nothing on top of it. Dana can also push blocks of ice, which will then slide until they fall or hit a wall. Dana's most important ability is his ice magic. He can create and destroy blocks of ice. As the gameplay is grid-based, Dana's ice magic affects the squares beneath him and to the left and right, similar to Lode Runner. If the ice block is placed horizontally adjacent to a wall, pipe, jar, or another ice block, it will freeze to the adjacent surface.

There are also other elements that are introduced as the player progresses, including pipes (which Dana can travel through) and jars. Dana can walk across normal jars, but once a jar comes in contact with a flame, it begins to burn. Dana cannot walk across the top of burning jars, and any ice that is created in, or enters the square above a burning jar is destroyed. As players progress, the puzzles get more complicated and difficult. The simple gameplay must be used in new ways by players who wish to complete the game.

The game's main story features 10 worlds, each with 10 stages to complete. The Japanese release includes an internal save battery, allowing players to save their progress, while the English releases instead features a password system. Upon completing all 100 stages and defeating Druidle, a cheat code is presented that unlocks a sound test option and 50 additional bonus stages. The game also features a stage editor, allowing players to design their own stages and puzzles, but only the Japanese version allows players to save their created stages.

== Reception ==
Reception

Review score
Publication	Score
Electronic Gaming Monthly	7/10, 8/10, 7/10, 6/10

Reviewers in Electronic Gaming Monthly were split on the title. One reviewer commented that the puzzles were "repetitive and uneventful. While each puzzle was different, the idea didn't change." and another only recommended it for fans of logic puzzles, concluding that "this is the type of game expect to see on the NES. It seems that's all it can handle." Other reviewers in the magazine called it "easily the best puzzle game in years!" and another felt the graphics were dated for the era, they said that it was a "very thought provoking" and that "planning a set of 15 to 30 moves is common in the later levels."
