= Tecmo World Wrestling =

1989 video game

- North American cover art
- Developer: Tecmo
- Publisher: Tecmo
- Platform: Nintendo Entertainment System
- Release: JP: September 1, 1989; NA: April 1990; EU: November 23, 1990
- Genre: Professional wrestling
- Modes: Single-player, Multiplayer

Tecmo World Wrestling is a Nintendo Entertainment System professional wrestling game for one or two players released in 1989 where the player can control one of ten fictional international professional wrestlers. This is the first wrestling game to feature a play-by-play announcer, the animated Tom Talker, although his speech was only text bubbles. The game's text, e.g. Tom Talker's commentary, was translated from the Japanese game almost directly, leading to instances of Engrish. For example the Northern Lights Suplex is called "Northern Right Suplex". The game was released in Japan under the name Gekitou Pro Wrestling!! Toukon Densetsu (激闘プロレス!! 闘魂伝説, Fierce Fighting Wrestling!! Legend of Fighting Spirit)

== Gameplay ==
Tecmo World Wrestling contains more than 20 moves per wrestler, by virtue of not having a dedicated grapple button. Instead, a grapple is initiated whenever the wrestlers walk into each other, and from there, combinations of the joypad and buttons can be used to perform a variety of holds and slams. There are also many situational moves (such as ground attacks, high-risk top-rope aerial attacks, and running attacks) to perform.

In addition, the game was perhaps the first to feature action replays: when certain signature moves are performed on a weakened wrestler, the game introduces a quick cut-scene, showing the move being performed, as if in a close-up television replay.

In-game screenshot.

Matches can be won by a standard three-count pinfall, submission, or by count-out (if a wrestler is tossed out of the ring, a twenty count starts, and if either wrestler is still outside of the ring when the count ends, they're disqualified). In the single-player game, if both wrestlers are counted out, it counts as a loss for the player.

The single-player mode consists of defeating all of the other wrestlers in the game with your chosen wrestler. Between matches, the player is given an option to train; through button mashing exercises, the player performs either squats, situps, or push-ups (with a sumo wrestler on his back). When the meter measuring your progress in training fills up, a sphere above the meter (seven in total) fills up. The more training you do, the more damage your moves will do during a match. Once all seven spheres fill up, you cannot train any further; however, if you lose a match against an opponent, you will lose a sphere, and you must train again to regain it. When all of the other wrestlers are defeated, the player must overcome the challenge of the non-playable final boss, "The Earl of Doom" Blue King, before winning the game.

Two-player mode in Tecmo World Wrestling features the same gameplay as the single-player game. Each player selects a wrestler (the game prevents the same character being chosen for both players) and then proceed directly into the match. The most notable difference from the single-player game is the addition of a momentum meter onscreen that rapidly swings back and forth between both players. This meter determines which player will have the advantage in a grappling situation.

== Wrestlers ==
Name	Nickname	Birthplace	Height	Weight	Specialties
Akira Dragon	The Samurai	Japan	6'3"	231 lb	Back Brain Kick, German Suplex
El Tigre	=Striker=	Mexico	6'0"	242 lb	Back Drop, "Northern Right Suplex"
Pat Gordon	Greek Warrior	Greece	6'5"	282 lb	Back Drop, Power Slam
Rex Beat	The British Star	United Kingdom	6'2"	286 lb	Power Bomb, Death Drop
Jackie Lee	Kung Fu Master	Hong Kong	5'11"	264 lb	German Suplex, Power Slam
Boris Chekov	The Siberian Machine	Soviet Union	6'3"	297 lb	Giant Swing, Power Slam
Mark Rose	Mr. Tattoo	West Germany	6'4"	260 lb	Back Drop, "Northern Right Suplex"
Julio Falcon	Iguanaman	Ecuador	6'7"	319 lb	Death Drop, Power Slam
Randy Gomez	The Flying Grenade	Venezuela	6'2"	275 lb	Back Brain Kick, Power Bomb
Dr. Guildo	The Technician	United States	6'8"	330 lb	Death Drop, Giant Swing
Blue King (Non-playable character)	Earl Of Doom	Unknown	???	???	Every wrestler's techniques

== Japanese version ==
The Japanese version of the game, released as Gekitou Pro Wrestling!! Toukon Densetsu has some notable differences from the western release. It was released a year earlier and has a password feature. The announcer is also different, sporting black hair and more Japanese looking facial features, his name according to the Japanese manual is Yasushi Geki. The female personal trainer also sports black hair.

== Reception ==
Reception

Review score
Publication	Score
Electronic Gaming Monthly	6/10, 7/10, 6/10, 7/10
