= Monster Rancher 2 =

1999 video game

- Developers: Tecmo; Koei Tecmo (1+2)
- Publishers: WW: Tecmo; EU: Sony Computer Entertainment (PS); Koei Tecmo (1+2)
- Series: Monster Rancher
- Platforms: PlayStation; Android; iOS; Nintendo Switch; Windows
- Release: February 25, 1999: PlayStation; JP: February 25, 1999; NA: September 7, 1999; EU: October 20, 2000 Android; JP: September 17, 2020 iOS, Nintendo Switch; JP: September 17, 2020; WW: December 9, 2021 Windows; WW: December 9, 2021
- Genre: Life simulation game
- Modes: Single-player, multiplayer

Monster Rancher 2, known in Japan as Monster Farm 2 (モンスターファーム２, Monsutā Fāmu Tsū), is a life simulation role-playing video game developed and published by Tecmo for the PlayStation. It is the second installment in the Monster Rancher series. It is the first game in the franchise to be released in Europe and PAL region, where it was published in October 2000 under the name Monster Rancher.

A port for Nintendo Switch, iOS, and Android was released by Tecmo's successor Koei Tecmo in Japan on September 17, 2020. An updated version for iOS, Nintendo Switch and Microsoft Windows via Steam was released worldwide on December 9, 2021 as part of the compilation titled Monster Rancher 1 & 2 DX along with Monster Rancher.

== Gameplay ==
This game involves raising, fighting, and breeding monsters. The main character is never seen on screen and never talks to anyone directly. Instead, all of the dialog and action is done by the trainer's assistant Colt and her toucan Joy. The player chooses their actions and choices through menu options.

Tournaments, from which money, items, and fame can be earned, are held throughout the year. However, only by winning an IMa Official Cup, four of which are held each year, can breeders and monsters earn higher ranks. As a monster's rank increases, it gains access to higher-level tournaments.

Monsters begin life knowing a small number of moves that can be used in battle, with more learned through training. To perform a move, a monster must expend some "guts", which regenerate constantly during battle. Each move can only be performed while within a particular range of an opponent; from close range, monsters can knock opponents back.

Besides the monster types the player can unlock from the beginning, there are many more which the player can raise. There are three different ways in which to unlock new monster types for raising: plot events, expedition, and errantry. The most common way these new monsters are given to the player is by the gain of an item, which when used to combine monsters, will produce this new type. After that happens, CDs will now be allowed to produce monsters of that type.

== Plot ==
The story of Monster Rancher 2 is largely non-linear with story events happening only after certain requirements are met (winning a battle, reaching a certain rank, etc.). The story begins with the main character going to register to become a trainer, it is there when Colt appears as the trainer's new official assistant. The "end" of the game is when a monster is able to beat the Big Four (the four highest-ranked battles in the game); when this happens, a video about the history of the monsters is shown. A monster who has beaten all four of the S class tournaments can then go on to compete in a special match for champion monsters like itself.

Monster Rancher 2 happens in close time proximity to Monster Rancher 1, but on a different continent (MR2 being set in the IMa area, and MR1 set in the FIMBA area). As a result of this, there is a special battle between the player and the assistant from the first game, Holly. This event takes place every four years, much like the Summer Olympics, and the player's monster has to be of certain rank to gain entry to. The event is called the IMa vs. FIMBA meet and always takes place in the last week of August. The player must win the preceding entry tournament first, which always takes place in the last week of July, respectively.

Defeating the Major 4 tournaments and the Legend Cup does not unlock all of the monsters in the game. There are different steps to take to unlock each main breed monster.

== Reception ==
Reception

Aggregate score
Aggregator	Score
Metacritic	83/100

Review scores
Publication	Score
AllGame	4.5/5
Electronic Gaming Monthly	6.67/10
Famitsu	8/10, 8/10, 8/10, 8/10
Game Informer	8.5/10
GameFan	95% (M.V.S.) 92%
GameRevolution	B
GameSpot	8.7/10
IGN	8.8/10
Official U.S. PlayStation Magazine	4/5
PlayStation: The Official Magazine	4/5

The game received "generally favorable reviews", albeit slightly less than the original game, according to the review aggregation website Metacritic.
