= Deception (video game series) =

Deception is a series of console tactical role-playing games created and published by Tecmo for Sony's line of PlayStation consoles. They have an emphasis on passive combat via the use of traps. There are five games in the franchise.

== Games ==
Release timeline
1996	Invitation to Darkness
1997
1998	Kagero: Deception II
1999	Deception III: Dark Delusion
2000
2001
2002
2003
2004
2005	Trapt (video game)
2006
2007
2008
2009
2010
2011
2012
2013
2014	Deception IV: Blood Ties

=== Tecmo's Deception: Invitation to Darkness ===
The first game in the series, released in 1996 for the PlayStation, Tecmo's Deception: Invitation to Darkness, released as Kokumeikan (刻命館) in Japan and Devil's Deception in Europe, plays unlike its successors in almost every capacity. It uses a first-person perspective similar to the King's Field series. The storyline is about a murdered, nameless prince who makes a pact with the Devil to become the master of the Castle of the Damned, in order to get revenge on his brother Yurias, who framed him for the murder of their father, the king, in order to usurp the throne and claim the fiancée of the player character, Princess Fiana.

In addition to the rating of Teen (for "animated violence" and "animated blood"), the back of the game's jewel case contains an additional disclaimer which reads: "WARNING: This game contains satanic references and may be inappropriate for some individuals". All later Deception titles received ratings of Mature.

The first Deception is home to a number of features that would never be seen again throughout the series' run. First, it is played from a first-person viewpoint. Secondly, instead of being limited to one wall-, ceiling- and floor-based trap in each castle room, the player can place as many traps as room space and Magic Points allow, although traps are used up after striking an invader once. Third, monsters can be constructed from captured invaders' bodies and summoned using "Block Orbs" to fight for the player. Fourth, the Castle of the Damned can be expanded with more rooms. Finally, each "family" of traps has only two upgrades, and are merely stronger variations of existing traps. This game is also the most role-playing-like of the series, with an emphasis on carrying and using items, increasing stats with item upgrades, and gaining character levels by killing or capturing invaders. Invitation to Darkness contains six different endings which can be attained by making different choices or accomplishments at key storyline junctions.

=== Kagero: Deception II ===
Kagero: Deception II
- Developer(s): Tecmo
- Publisher(s): Tecmo; Virgin Interactive
- Composer(s): Hiroshi Miyazaki (aka Miyashiro Sugito); Masaaki Udagawa; Ayako Toyoda
- Platform(s): PlayStation, PlayStation Network
- Release: JP: July 23, 1998; NA: October 14, 1998; EU: September 10, 1999; JP: December 24, 2008 (PSN)
- Genre(s): Strategy-RPG
- Mode(s): Single-player

Shifting the viewpoint to third-person and the emphasis to trap combos, Kagero: Deception II released as Kagero: Kokumeikan Shinsho (影牢～刻命館真章～) in Japan, formed the foundation of current Deception titles and would be built upon in future titles, coming out two years after its predecessor. In it, players assume the role of Millennia, a young girl being used as a puppet and guard for a race known as Timenoids (or TMD, as the game abbreviates their race's name), who are like humans except immortal, and whose power is desired by the humans whose lives they govern. Millennia finds herself in the middle of the war between her own race and her captors, with her chosen side dictated by the player.

The change in how traps function give this game a much more strategic edge than its predecessor, with traps able to interact with one another in long strings that could be likened to Rube Goldberg set-ups, just much more lethal and involving other people. Instead of using items such as medicinal herbs, healing is accomplished via glowing blue crystals called "loons" which can only be touched once before breaking, never to be used again in a given chapter. Trap improvement is conducted by using the points earned after successfully killing each invader, called Ark, and by following a somewhat logical "tree"—improving an Arrow Slit after a Lightning Rod was created could make a Laser Arrow, for instance. Six secret traps (one of which depicts Suezo, a popular monster from Tecmo's own Monster Rancher titles) can be unlocked in future replays by completing the game and achieving all four endings in the game, as well. Traps, when constructed, can be used as often as the player likes, but require a recharge time between uses in any given level.

=== Trapt ===
Trapt was marketed as Kagero II: Dark Illusion in Japan. Players control Princess Allura, a maiden who runs away from her kingdom after being framed for the murder of her father, and who enters into a similar demonic contract with a being known only as "Fiend" to get revenge on her pursuers.

This game utilizes what are known as "Dark Illusions"—specialty traps which are contained within the room of any given castle, and require a special sequence of triggers in order to be used. Furthermore, at certain points in the storyline, side stories can be explored which present some alternate scenarios from the main plotline, providing more backstory on the game's events. Included in the game's menu is a Survival Mode, which pits Allura against waves of invaders with only nine traps at her disposal—three ceiling, three wall, and three floor. Creating new traps necessitates the spending of "Warl", like Ark and Dreak before it, and is done similarly to Kagero through the use of a logical tree. Secret traps and settings can be purchased with Warl by finishing the game and unlocking the three endings, collecting preset amounts of Ark, or by killing all encountered invaders.

=== Deception IV: Blood Ties ===
Deception IV: Blood Ties, known in Japan as Kagero: Dark Side Princess (影牢 ダークサイド・プリンセス), is a game for the PlayStation Vita and PlayStation 3 by Tecmo Koei, and sequel to Deception III: Dark Delusion. The game is a revisit of Tecmo's 1996 PlayStation game Tecmo's Deception: Invitation to Darkness, and features similar trap-based strategy gameplay. The game was released on February 27, 2014 in Japan, March 25 in North America and March 28 in Europe.

==== Deception IV: The Nightmare Princess ====
Deception IV: The Nightmare Princess, known in Japan as Kagero: Another Princess (影牢 ～もう1人のプリンセス～) is an expansion pack to the game Deception IV: Blood Ties.

Players are able to take the role of Velguirie, a new maiden that has the ability to stamp, stomp, and kick on her victims for extra damage. Other characters from previous Deception games are met in the newly added Quest Mode, where players will have to face-off against them along the way. These characters can also be used in-game by the player once certain quest objectives have been completed.

Deception IV: The Nightmare Princess was released on 26 March 2015 in Japan for PlayStation 3, PlayStation 4 and PlayStation Vita.
