= Monster Rancher 3 =

2001 video game

- North American PlayStation 2 cover art
- Developer: Tecmo
- Publisher: Tecmo
- Series: Monster Rancher
- Platform: PlayStation 2
- Release: JP: March 22, 2001; NA: September 25, 2001
- Genre: Life simulation game
- Modes: Single-player, multiplayer

Monster Rancher 3 (known in Japan as Monster Farm 3 (モンスターファーム3, Monsutā Fāmu Surī)) is the third game in Tecmo's Monster Rancher series. It is the first game in the series for the PlayStation 2.

== Gameplay ==
This game uses cel-shaded graphics to give the game a more cartoon-like feel. However, the player may still generate monsters by inserting a disc into the PS2. Furthermore, Monster Rancher 3 is the first game in the series to allow players the ability to generate monsters based on past discs, as well as monsters already bred. As an example, once a monster has been bred, one can simply generate them from their Monster Encyclopedia after breeding; this saves the player from unnecessary time and trouble of having to remember and find discs that generated various monsters. Also, Monster Rancher 3 is the first and currently only Monster Rancher game to allow players to trade monster data. By inserting memory cards for both players, it is possible to transfer monsters in one player's Monster Encyclopedia to another player's file.

== Reception ==
Reception

Aggregate score
Aggregator	Score
Metacritic	77/100

Review scores
Publication	Score
AllGame	3.5/5
Electronic Gaming Monthly	7/10 (Note: Three critics of Electronic Gaming Monthly gave the game each a score of 6/10, 7/10, and 8/10.)
Famitsu	29/40
Game Informer	9.25/10
GameSpot	8.4/10
GameSpy	82%
IGN	7.9/10
Next Generation	3/5
Official U.S. PlayStation Magazine	4/5
PlayStation: The Official Magazine	7/10

The game received "generally favorable reviews", albeit less than the previous two games in the series, according to the review aggregation website Metacritic. Eric Bratcher of NextGen called it "A unique, absorbing game that needs to expand its vision in order to live up to its revolutionary roots." In Japan, Famitsu gave it a score of 29 out of 40.
