= Japanese destroyer Kagerō =

Two Japanese destroyers have been named Kagerō (陽炎; "heat haze"):

- Japanese destroyer Kagerō (1899), a Murakumo-class destroyer of the Imperial Japanese Navy during the Russo-Japanese War.
- Japanese destroyer Kagerō (1938), lead ship of the Kagerō-class destroyer, a class of nineteen destroyers of the Imperial Japanese Navy during World War II.

== See also ==
- Kagerō
