= Deception III: Dark Delusion =

1999 video game

- North American cover art
- Developer: Tecmo
- Publisher: Tecmo
- Director: Makoto Shibata
- Composer: Hiroshi Miyazaki
- Series: Deception
- Platform: PlayStation
- Release: JP: December 9, 1999; NA: February 29, 2000
- Genre: Tactical role-playing
- Mode: Single-player

Deception III: Dark Delusion (Note: Japanese: 蒼魔灯, Hepburn: Sōmatō) is a tactical role-playing video game developed and published by Tecmo for PlayStation in 1999.

== Gameplay ==
Deception III expanded on the gameplay of Kagero by introducing a training mode, a mission mode, and trap enhancement through a series of crests and other artifacts. In the main story mode, players control Reina, a girl who, with her adoptive family, has been taken captive to the land of Burgenhagen to be sold into slavery. Reina must use the trapping powers she acquired to defeat her kidnappers and solve the mysteries of the pendant she wears, which other people seem to covet for unknown reasons.

The Free Training mode is simply a means of testing all of the available traps in a controlled environment with an immortal invader who can be programmed to adopt behavioral patterns, to learn their effects and uses without any real consequences. The mission mode, known as Expert Mode, assigns the player a given goal to achieve, usually within a time limit, with the traps available being any unlocked up to that point. Typical missions include "Crush the invader with a 4-hit combo" and "Make the killing hit a Pendulum trap". Also included is a Trap License mode which functions as a further tutorial, asking the player to perform various tasks that teach the nuances of the game in the name of learning helpful tips or trap functions. Traps are even more customizable than in previous games through the uses of Base Circles, Orbs, Emblems, and Rings. Base Circles contain the variety of trap involved (Pendulum, Arrow Slit, Bear Claw, etc.); Orbs determine the power level of the trap, ranging from 1 to 4; Emblems give the trap an element or special characteristic (Lightning, Fire, Slave, etc.); and Rings further enhance a trap by increasing their power, shortening their charge time, or a myriad number of other changes. The more modifications a trap employs, the more "Dreak" (the replacement for Kagero's Ark) it takes, but again, traps could be used infinitely upon creation. The loons from Kagero also returned as the sole means of regaining lost hit points. While not having secret traps, special emblems and rings can be acquired by achieving the game's four endings. Game saves are one block in size.

== Reception ==
Reception

Aggregate score
Aggregator	Score
GameRankings	71%

Review scores
Publication	Score
AllGame	3.5/5
CNET Gamecenter	7/10
Electronic Gaming Monthly	7.5/10 (Note: In Electronic Gaming Monthly's review of the game, one critic gave it 8/10, two others gave it each a score of 7.5/10, and the other gave it 7/10.)
EP Daily	7.5/10
Famitsu	31/40
Game Informer	6.25/10
GameFan	(G.N.) 97% 83% (Note: In GameFan's viewpoint of the game, three critics gave it each a score of 73, 87, and 89.)
GameRevolution	B
GameSpot	6/10
IGN	6/10
Next Generation	3/5
Official U.S. PlayStation Magazine	4/5

The game received above-average reviews according to the review aggregation website GameRankings. Eric Bratcher of NextGen called it "a creative niche title, worth checking out if you have a strong stomach and want something new." In Japan, Famitsu gave it a score of 31 out of 40.

The D-Pad Destroyer of GamePro said of the game in one review, "Gamers with a definite dark side should take a look at Dark Delusion. If you've ever had a guest that wouldn't leave, or if you've simply wanted to drop a flaming rock on someone's head, then Deception III might just trap you in front of your TV for a long time." (Note: GamePro gave the game two 4/5 scores for graphics and control, and two 4.5/5 scores for sound and fun factor in one review.) In another GamePro review, Four-Eyed Dragon said, "Deception III's simple premise can become repetitive after a dozen or so missions. While fans of the Deception series will feel right at home, those who are new to the series should rent first. Entrapping and maiming isn't everyone's cup of tea, but it's fun for a night at least." (Note: GamePro gave the game two 4/5 scores for graphics and fun factor, and two 4.5/5 scores for sound and control in another review.)

The game was nominated for the "Best Strategy Game" award at the Official U.S. PlayStation Magazine 2000 Editors' Awards, which went to Front Mission 3.
