= Monster Rancher Hop-A-Bout =

2000 video game

- Box art
- Developer: Tecmo
- Publisher: Tecmo
- Series: Monster Rancher
- Platforms: PlayStation, arcade
- Release: NA: December 10, 2000; JP: March 22, 2001
- Genre: Platform
- Modes: Single-player, multiplayer

Monster Rancher Hop-A-Bout (Note: Japanese: モンスターファームジャンプ, Hepburn: Monsutā Fāmu Janpu; lit. "Monster Farm Jump") is a 2000 platform video game developed and published by Tecmo for the PlayStation. It is a spin-off of the Monster Rancher series. It was released in North America on December 10, 2000 and in Japan on March 22, 2001. An arcade version was released in 2001. It will be released as part of Hamster Corporation's Console Archives series for the Nintendo Switch 2 and PlayStation 5.

== Gameplay ==
The player control monsters who hop along linear levels on a pogo stick, reaching the finish line while avoiding holes. Tiles affect the player's speed, hit points, direction or jumps. The game ends when the player falls into the void or loses all hit points.

== Reception ==
David Smith of IGN gave the game a 3/10 score, criticizing its severe lack of content and simple gameplay in comparison to its price tag.
