= Monster Rancher 4 =

2003 video game

- North American box art
- Developer: Tecmo
- Publisher: Tecmo
- Series: Monster Rancher
- Platform: PlayStation 2
- Release: JP: August 14, 2003; NA: November 17, 2003
- Genre: Life simulation game
- Modes: Single-player, multiplayer

Monster Rancher 4 (known in Japan as Monster Farm 4 (モンスターファーム4, Monsutā Fāmu Fō)) is a monster breeding and management game that was released by Tecmo for the PlayStation 2 in 2003.

== Gameplay ==
Like the previous installments, this game involves the raising, breeding, and fighting of monsters. Monsters are created via a "Saucer Stone" regeneration system. There are several methods to obtaining a monster. Players must go to the Shrine, where they can choose their preferred method to generate a monster. One is the disc method where the player swaps the Monster Rancher 4 disc with a CD, DVD, or another game disc. A monster is then generated from the data contained on that disc. The next method is through in-game disc stones which can be obtained from adventures or tournaments. A pre-determined monster will then be generated based on the specific disc stone. Once the monster has been generated, their data is recorded in the encyclopedia. Players can then regenerate any monster that has been recorded in the encyclopedia at any point. Once a player regenerates a monster, they can raise it on a ranch, and train it to compete in battles. The limit for monsters depend on the size of their ranch but the maximum is five monsters.

== Premise ==
Monster Rancher 4 is the first game in the series to be story-driven. Breeder rank progression is no longer tied to beating official tournaments, but by progressing the main story. The playable character is no longer silent, and has the default name "Phayne." The story centers around Phayne, who is offered a job working on a ranch, and the mysterious girl Rio, who has the abnormal ability to talk to monsters. Rio eventually works alongside Phayne on the ranch; once a mysterious man by the name of Mr. K appears at their doorstep, the real plot begins to unfold.

== Reception ==
Reception

Aggregate score
| Aggregator | Score |
|---|---|
| Metacritic | 77/100 |

Review scores
| Publication | Score |
|---|---|
| Edge | 4/10 |
| Electronic Gaming Monthly | 6.33/10 |
| Game Informer | 8.25/10 |
| GamePro | 4/5 |
| GameSpot | 7.4/10 |
| GameZone | 8.4/10 |
| IGN | 8.5/10 |
| Official U.S. PlayStation Magazine | 3.5/5 |
| PlayStation: The Official Magazine | 8/10 |

The game received "generally favorable reviews" according to the review aggregation website Metacritic.

IGN ranked it as the 88th best PlayStation 2 game. The staff praised its improvements over its predecessors.
