= Trapt (video game) =

2005 video game

- North American cover art
- Developer: Tecmo
- Publisher: Tecmo
- Directors: Akihiro Arahori; Makoto Shibata
- Producer: Keisuke Kikuchi
- Designers: Masaru Ueda; Hiroki Watanabe
- Composer: Takashi Kouga
- Series: Deception
- Platform: PlayStation 2
- Release: JP: June 30, 2005; NA: November 1, 2005; EU: February 24, 2006
- Genre: Action-Strategy
- Mode: Single player

Trapt (Note: Released in Japan as Kagero II: Dark Illusion (影牢II: Dark Illusion)) is a 2005 action video game with strategy game elements developed and published by Tecmo for the PlayStation 2. It is the only spin-off title in the Deception series.

The player assumes the role of Princess Allura, who has been framed for the murder of her father, King Olaf. On the night of the King's murder, Allura is accused of killing him by her stepmother, Catalina. With the help of her friend Rachel, Allura is able to escape into a forest. On the run from assassins, she acquires the ability to set a series of traps, which are the only means she has of defending herself from her pursuers.

An emulated version for the PlayStation 3 was released as a PlayStation 2 Classic on February 4, 2014 in North America.

== Gameplay ==
Allura (foreground) triggers a floor trap, launching her pursuer towards a ceiling trap

Players begin by equipping and making traps for Allura to take with her into the game mission. Each mission starts in a specific room, where players can position traps in order to defeat enemies. The traps are classified into three types according to where they can be positioned within the game world (wall, ceiling, and floor). The player is allowed to take up to three traps of each type into a game stage, and additional traps can be obtained by completing the game. Enemies' life bars are shown at the top of the screen, while Allura's life bar and active traps are shown at the bottom left and right respectively. As the player defeats enemies they are rewarded with "warl", the game's currency, which can be used to purchase new traps between missions. Players may also purchase room keys, which allow Allura to access other rooms in the game missions. Apart from the main story missions, the game also includes several "side stories", which are optional missions that give different angles and insights into the game's main story. There are three official endings in the game, and a fourth that is not registered when saved onto the game file.

Apart from regular traps, Trapt introduces "Dark Illusions", which are pre-existing traps found throughout the mansion. Each is located in a different room and has a different effect upon an enemy. Each Dark Illusion requires certain criteria to be fulfilled before activation and can only be used once per level.

== Plot ==
=== Characters ===
For the majority of the game, the player controls Allura, the daughter of the recently deceased king. Reina and Millenia, protagonists of the third and second Deception games respectively, are shown as unlockable characters in the game, and Millenia is also included as a boss:

- Allura: The heroine of the story and princess of Fronenberg. She is caught up in the plot taking place in the palace, and is forced to flee. After escaping, she enters a mansion where she encounters the Fiend (Malphas), who grants her the power to control traps. The Japanese voiceovers in the game refer to Allura as "Alicia". She is soon revealed to be the half-sister of Rachel, and her father had used Allura as a pawn to awaken Malphas for a resurrection ritual. In the evil and possessed endings, she is either taken in as a servant of Malphas or has her corpse possessed if she is killed by Malphas. In the good ending, she presumably kills him and is made into the new queen of Fronenberg.
- Rachel: Allura's maid and close friend. She is responsible for Allura's education and well being. At the end of the game, it is revealed that she is Allura's older half sister who desired to summon Malphas to complete her dead mother's plot of revenge against Olaf for abandoning Rachel's mother. Rachel had learned about the power of Malphas from her mother and after acquiring the powers necessary to summon various traps, became a maid of Allura in order to gain Olaf's trust. In the evil ending, she is murdered by Allura. In the possessed and good endings, if Allura refuses to fight her she is crushed under falling debris. She is successful in summoning Malphas in the latter endings after she injured Allura with a knife, using Allura's spilt blood to summon Malphas. She fights using a dagger and can use Allura's own traps against her due to them sharing Malphas' summoning power. The only difference is that Rachel has no accessory on her arm when she uses her powers.
- Catalina: King Olaf's second wife and the secondary antagonist. Olaf's constant longing for his previous wife hurt Catalina's pride as a woman and caused her to harbor a strong resentment towards Allura, who is the daughter of King Olaf's first wife. Catalina has taken advantage of the King, who has become a shadow of his former self, and hatched a plot to stage a coup. In the end, she is killed by Allura after trying to unsuccessfully negate Allura's ability to summon demonic traps.
- Jais: A knight of the Fronenberg and deemed the best swordsman in the kingdom. Jais is an orphan and strives to save orphans like himself, but the kingdom has continued to fall into disorder despite his best efforts. In all three endings, he is the only character who actually survives, but he is confronted and killed by Allura if she decides to retreat. In the good ending, Jais helps Allura escape Malphas' mansion and goes to search for survivors, only to have a demon sneak up on him. His fate afterwards remains uncertain.
- Ada: A notorious female thief. Ada's excellent ability with knives led her to work as an assassin. She appears to have been involved in the assassination of the king and there is a lot of mystery surrounding her actions. She is later killed by her brother after he revealed his plans to acquire demonic power for his own purposes.
- King Olaf: The recently deceased King of Fronenberg and Allura's father. In order to keep the kingdom balanced, Olaf remarried after the death of his first wife. Both Olaf and Allura were devastated at the death of his first wife. Olaf married Catalina, but never stopped loving his late wife. King Olaf was murdered in front of Catalina, Allura and Rachel, but nobody knows who is responsible for this crime. He is ultimately revealed to be alive and planning on using the powers of Malphas to resurrect his dead wife, only to be betrayed and killed by his general, Hertzog. He is also the father of Rachel, but soon fell in love with Allura's mother and became a target of revenge by Rachel.
- Malphas: Also known as "the Fiend", he serves as the primary antagonist of the game. Long ago, he was sealed away by powerful sorcerers in the mansion that Allura enters and grants her the power to create/control traps via a tentacle like bracelet on her arm. With each person Allura kills with her traps, his or her soul is offered to Malphas so that he can use their souls to materialize once again. Malphas appears in two forms, with his first form being a pale human dressed in a black robe, and his demonic form being a red humanoid with spiked red hair and ornate decorations and blades sticking out of his body. In both the evil and possessed endings, Malphas is successful at bringing Allura to his side (possessing her corpse in the possessed ending and using her as a follower in the evil ending), but he is ultimately killed in the good ending, furiously shouting how it is both the end of the world and of his own existence. It is still unclear whether Allura's efforts were enough to kill Malphas, as a demon servant was shown sneaking up on Jais in the good ending.

== Development ==
Producer Keisuke Kikuchi renamed the game Trapt from its original title of Deception 4 because he considered it the first part of a new series. The development team used existing torture devices and historical items as the basis for the traps found in the game, collecting books and photographs for reference. These traps were modified "so that they would be good for a video game". Most of the traps were generated from the staffs' own ideas, some others were inspired by comic books and films. Two weeks were spent creating an initial pool of 720 trap ideas, after a few days deliberation and examination it was decided that 45 traps would be needed. A number of further screening processes were needed to bring down the total to 45. Hitoshi Hasegawa (the game's Director of Development and Promotion) stated that the "killer clock" Dark Illusion was inspired by a specific anime but did not mention its title. The more advanced PlayStation 2 graphics, compared to those of the original PlayStation which previous Deception games were developed for, resulted in some traps being toned down due to them being considered too grotesque.

The developers experienced difficulty in creating the enemies' artificial intelligence, due to each enemy behaving differently depending on their personality. Some characters remember where traps have been placed if they had previously fallen victim to them and avoid passing through the same location or make "comical moves" to evade them. The team "had a lot of fun tailoring and adjusting the AI to suit these funnier moments." All the characters in the game, including the minor characters that Allura encounters, have background stories. Hasegawa noted that this is "one of the features that the Deception series is renowned for in Japan." The team's purpose for doing so is because they "want the player to defeat their enemies, but to also feel guilty about doing this."

== Reception ==
Reception

Aggregate scores
Aggregator	Score
GameRankings	61%
Metacritic	60/100

Review scores
Publication	Score
Electronic Gaming Monthly	6.5/10
Eurogamer	6/10
Famitsu	31/40
Game Informer	6.75/10
GamePro	2.5/5
GameRevolution	D+
GameSpot	6.9/10
GameSpy	3/5
GameZone	6/10
IGN	7.5/10
Official U.S. PlayStation Magazine	3/5

Trapt received "mixed" reviews according to video game review aggregator Metacritic. In Japan, Famitsu gave it a score of one nine, one eight, and two sevens, for a total of 31 out of 40.

Reviewers generally agreed that the overall content of the game is acceptable, however several issues with technical stability and a poor translation from its original Japanese language reduces its quality. The amount of slowdown (drop in frame rate) caused by activating traps in particular drew criticism from reviewers. Greg Mueller of GameSpot stated, "The frame rate comes grinding to a halt whenever traps are activated." Louis Bedigian of GameZone also noted the slowdown, suggesting that with the already slow pace of gameplay it "could be summed up as being a wait and see RTS". Kristan Reed of Eurogamer said the game suffers from a "rubbish camera system and an all-round feel of technical impoverishment". VideoGamer.com reviewer Tom Orry found the in-game camera "awful" and "by far the biggest problem." Andrew Reiner of Game Informer compared the game to a "Demonic Cut" version of the Christmas movie Home Alone and criticized it for repetition and its limitation in scope, saying, "I enjoyed the Deception series on PSone, but this sequel hasn't made any strides forward. Inflicting unspeakable pain on mindless video game drones puts you in the shoes of wily Kevin McCallister, but as you'll soon learn, anything that reminds you of Macaulay Culkin is not good."

Despite the technical issues, Trapt was praised for its uniqueness on the PlayStation 2 platform, as well as the game's premise of killing Allura's pursuers, though most reviewers found faults which detracted from their lasting impressions. Chris Roper of IGN commented "death and destruction is always good fun. If that's all [you're] expecting from Trapt, you'll likely have a good time with it." GameSpy's Benjamin Turner found the game to be "a decent execution of a fairly original concept, at least when it's not bombarding the player with questionable movie scenes." 1UP.com writer Richard Li said the game encourages players to find inventive ways to kill enemies, but added "It's fun at first, but its flaws prevent it from being a spectacular and memorable experience."
