= Tecmo's Deception: Invitation to Darkness =

1996 video game

- North American cover art
- Developer: Tecmo
- Publishers: WW: Tecmo; EU: Sunsoft
- Series: Deception
- Platform: PlayStation
- Release: JP: July 26, 1996; NA: November 20, 1996; EU: November 22, 1996
- Genre: Action role-playing
- Mode: Single-player

Tecmo's Deception: Invitation to Darkness is a 1996 action role-playing video game developed and published by Tecmo for the PlayStation. Although often referred to simply as "Deception", the game's official title is Tecmo's Deception. Tecmo's Deception was released as Kokumeikan (刻命館) in Japan, and as Devil's Deception in Europe by Sunsoft. The game inverts the common tropes of role-playing video games by placing the player in the role of an evil lord who must use traps and monsters to kill the adventuring parties which invade his castle. As the story progresses, the player character learns he has been the victim of multiple deceptions, and must decide whether to proceed with his plan to revive the Devil or convert to the cause of good.

The game is the first in the Deception series. It was a critical success, with reviewers particularly praising the originality of the game's concept.

== Premise and gameplay ==
Tecmo's Deception is a real-time role-playing video game (RPG), resembling the trap-em-up genre of games, such as Night Trap and Double Switch. The primary object of the game is to dispatch intruders through the positioning and activation of traps.

The player takes on the role of a man about to be unjustly executed, who pleads to the forces of darkness to spare his life at the moment of his intended demise. Satan grants his request, and gives him command over the 'Castle of the Damned'. Many visitors are drawn to the fortress: some for power, some for salvation, and some for something as simple as shelter.

Each time a party of intruders arrive, the player is given access to a 2D map of the castle from which they can place traps by spending Magic Points (a form of currency in the game, as there is no maximum MP) or add rooms by spending gold. When done with this, gameplay proceeds from a first-person perspective in a texture-mapped 3D environment. Unlike most trap-em-up games, the player must pursue intruders and activate traps in person, rather than remotely. The story will take various paths depending on the choices the player makes.

Some traps are used to capture opponents, such as a falling cage and a bear trap, while others are used to damage them, such as a one-ton weight which falls from the ceiling. Even when a trap is correctly sprung, the intruder has a chance of eluding it. If the player successfully springs a capture trap, the intruder's remaining HP and a timer determined by the specific trap type simultaneously count down. If the intruder's HP reaches 0 first, the intruder is captured; if the trap timer reaches 0 first, the intruder breaks free of the trap. As such, most intruders must be damaged to some extent before the player can capture them. All traps can be upgraded to two higher tiers by spending gold in the Develop menu. For example, Stomp can be upgraded to Poison Toe, and then to Fire Foot.

To help lead intruders into traps, the player can also spend Magic Points in order to don one of five masks. Each mask emits a different scream to either attract or repel intruders.

The player can either destroy them outright, or capture intruders and then kill them. Killing intruders outright is easier because it does not require the use of capture traps, but capturing them offers more unique rewards. The player may take a captive's soul for Magic Points, kill them for gold, or (after acquiring an artifact later in the game) transform their corpses into necromantic slaves which can be summoned to attack intruders. Regardless of which method the player uses to dispatch an intruder, they are rewarded with experience points (which level up the player character, making them more resilient to attacks and giving access to new traps) and any items the intruder was carrying. There are also a tiny percentage of intruders who are willing to leave the castle peacefully, though the player can still capture or kill them before they reach the exit. Once acquired, traps can also be upgraded into more powerful versions of themselves.

== Plot ==
Tecmo's Deception plays out in a medieval fantasy setting. The player is in the role of the eldest prince of Zemekia, who is player-named. The prince has returned from a visit to Angelio, where he fell in love with and became engaged to Princess Fiana. Upon being reunited with his son, the king of Zemekia begins to announce his intention to abdicate in order to allow the player character to assume the throne and revitalize the kingdom. Alarmed, the court magician Zamur materializes the prince's sword above, causing it to impale the king, killing him before he can formally make the announcement. The prince's younger brother, Yurias, blames the king's murder on the player character - thereby effectively framing him and bringing about his imprisonment.

The player character is found guilty and sentenced to death. Consumed with hatred not only for Yurias and Zamur for framing him, but for the entire people of Zemekia for being 'fickle' and not believing in his innocence, he pleads from the gallows for power to get revenge on the world. A bolt of lightning seemingly incinerates him, but in fact teleports him to the Castle of the Damned at the will of the demon named Astarte. She invites him to become the castle's new master so that he can make a deal with Satan for the power he seeks.

Once inside the Castle of the Damned, the player character is beset by its master, Ardebaran. He is saved by Idorigo, a warrior seeking vengeance on Ardebaran for the murder of his friend. Ardebaran finds the player character again, but is caught off-guard by a trap he did not set (presumably placed by Astarte). The player character kills him and takes from him the ring symbolizing his contract with Satan. At Astarte's directions, he then captures and kills Idorigo (who then turns on him as he, as well, is seeing 'the power'), proving he is merciless enough to be the castle's master.

The Castle of the Damned is beset by adventurers, petitioners, and later assassins, once Yurias learns that his brother is still alive. The player character kills them while collecting six magical treasures needed to unseal Satan in fulfillment of his contract. In the absence of the rightful heir, Yurias has claimed the throne and is coercing Fiana to marry him, insinuating that he will have her executed as a co-conspirator with his brother if she refuses. Fiana writes a letter imploring the player character to return to her. He does not send a reply, and Fiana's messenger is found murdered outside the Castle of the Damned (depending on the player's actions, either by the player character or by one of Yurias's assassins). Despite this, after escaping from Yurias's palace she enters the Castle of the Damned and tells the player character she is willing to stay with him despite the horrors of his new dwelling.

Yurias sends a wizard to kill Fiana. To save her, the player character must kill the wizard in two hours and five minutes (roughly equivalent to 62 seconds in real time). If the player character saves Fiana, she is horrified at the sight of him killing the wizard and leaves him.

Frustrated at the repeated failures of their assassins, Yurias and Zamur attack the player character personally. After the player character slays Yurias, Zamur tells him that he and Astarte have been manipulating him from the beginning into collecting the magical treasures so that Zamur can summon Satan and use his powers to control him. Seeking aid from the "Legendary Braves" who sealed Satan away, the player character uses one of the treasures to travel back in time. There he meets an ancestor of his, one of the Legendary Braves. The player character can either kill him to acquire a special trap that can stop Astarte, or tell him that he comes from the future seeking help to seal Satan again, in which case he gives the player character the trap freely.

Returning to the present, the player character is confronted by Zamur. Astarte kills Zamur and claims Zamur's earlier assertions were a result of her toying with his mind; the player character coming to the Castle of the Damned was never part of Zamur's plan, and Astarte has always been on the player character's side, not Zamur's. She then instructs him to revive Satan.

The game branches into six endings depending on the player character's actions:

- If he saves Fiana and seals away Satan, Fiana arrives and says he must still make recompense for the sins he committed as master of the castle. She accompanies him on a journey across the land, anonymously helping people in need.
- If he saves Fiana and seals away Satan, but kills his ancestor, Fiana instead tells him she will always love him, kills him with a dagger, and then commits suicide.
- If he fails to save Fiana and seals away Satan, his ancestor convinces him to return to the past with him and try to change the future so that attempted revivals of Satan never occur.
- If he fails to save Fiana and kills his ancestor, but seals away Satan, he undertakes the same redemptive quest as in the first ending, but alone.
- If he lies to his ancestor, claiming he wants to seal away Satan, and elects to revive Satan instead, his ancestor follows him to the present, kills Astarte, and shatters the demonic portal, averting Satan's revival. The player character is condemned to subsisting on the souls of castle intruders for the rest of his life.
- If he kills his ancestor and opts to revive Satan, Astarte reveals that to do so he must offer himself as a human sacrifice. After the player character kills himself, Satan is freed and lays waste to the world, destroying even himself in his rage.

== Reception ==
Reception

Review scores
Publication	Score
AllGame	4.5/5
Electronic Gaming Monthly	8.25/10
Famitsu	6/10, 9/10, 6/10, 6/10
Game Informer	6.5/10
IGN	7/10
Next Generation	3/5

Award
Publication	Award
Electronic Gaming Monthly	Best Original Concept

The game was met with positive reception upon its release. The four reviewers of Electronic Gaming Monthly focused on the game's originality, with Crispin Boyer referring to it as "perhaps the most innovative console RPG ever released". Electronic Gaming Monthly later gave it their "Best Original Concept" award for 1996. In GamePro, Art Angel scored it 5/5 for sound and 4.5/5 for graphics, control and fun factor. He praised the engaging story line, innovative gameplay, eerie and atmospheric sounds, and detailed graphics, concluding it to be an "excellent addition to the RPG market. It has something most other RPGs seem to have lost: originality." A reviewer for Next Generation was critical of the fact that the player cannot attack victims directly, saying it made the gameplay "oddly passive", and also commented unfavorably on the slow pace and lack of multiple save slots. However, he praised the graphics and the originality of the concept, describing it as "one of the strangest and subtly disturbing games we've ever played."
