= Monster Rancher Advance =

2001 video game

- North American box art
- Developer: Tecmo
- Publisher: Tecmo
- Series: Monster Rancher
- Platform: Game Boy Advance
- Release: NA: November 29, 2001; JP: December 7, 2001
- Genre: Life simulation
- Modes: Single-player, multiplayer

Monster Rancher Advance (known in Japan as Monster Farm Advance (モンスターファーム アドバンス, Monsutā Fāmu Adobansu)) is a 2001 life simulation video game developed and published by Tecmo for the Game Boy Advance. It is a spin-off of the Monster Rancher series.

== Gameplay ==
Similar to the other Monster Rancher games, gameplay revolves around creating, raising, and fighting monsters. Due to the Game Boy Advance's limitations, players do not generate monsters by inserting disks into the console, but rather by typing characters. Players can also create new monsters by combining two existing ones, just like in the PlayStation versions. One of the differences between this and earlier Monster Rancher titles is that Dino has been replaced with Zumms, as well as several species, such as Monols, having been omitted.

== Reception ==
Reception

Aggregate score
| Aggregator | Score |
|---|---|
| Metacritic | 76/100 |

Review scores
| Publication | Score |
|---|---|
| AllGame | 3.5/5 |
| Famitsu | 30/40 |
| Game Informer | 8.5/10 |
| GamePro | 5/5 |
| GameSpot | 8.4/10 |
| GameSpy | 81% |
| GameZone | 5.5/10 |
| IGN | 6.5/10 |
| Nintendo Power | 3.5/5 |

The game received "generally favorable reviews" according to the review aggregation website Metacritic. In Japan, Famitsu gave it a score of 30 out of 40.
