= Monster Rancher =

Video game series

- The Monster Rancher logo of Monster Rancher 4, the eighth game in the series. Most titles use a similar logo.
- Genres: Life simulation role-playing game, raising game
- Developers: Tecmo; Koei Tecmo
- Publishers: Tecmo; Koei Tecmo
- Platforms: PlayStation, PlayStation 2, Game Boy Color, Game Boy Advance, Microsoft Windows, Nintendo DS, Nintendo Switch, Android, iOS
- First release: Monster Rancher; November 30, 1997
- Latest release: Ultra Kaiju Monster Rancher; October 20, 2022

Monster Rancher, known in Japan as Monster Farm (モンスターファーム, Monsutā Fāmu), is a Japanese media franchise and series of life simulation role-playing video games created by Tecmo (now Koei Tecmo). The series consists of fifteen games across numerous different video game platforms, and an anime adaptation that aired from 1999 to 2000.

Monster Rancher is a popular series in Japan, and it maintains a cult following elsewhere. As of 2007, the series has sold 4 million copies.

== Setting ==
Monster Rancher is set in a world where monsters exist alongside humans. Monsters were created by God in ancient times, following a disaster that struck the world prior to continental drift. However, the monsters caused problems for humanity. As such God sealed them in "disc stones", small circular stone tablets containing their genomes, and entrusted humanity with them. However, as time passed, the disc stones became lost knowledge.

Eventually, archaeologists rediscovered a disc stone while excavating ancient ruins. They brought the disc stone to the Monsters' Temple, where the priests, using ancient summoning methods, summoned the monster in the disc stone back into existence. Monsters were reintroduced into nature and, for the most part, coexisted with humans. Eventually, monster owners and breeders began holding monster battles as a sport, which became popular worldwide, leading to official battle tournaments.

== Games ==
Release timeline
1997	Monster Rancher
1998
1999	Monster Rancher 2
1999	Monster Rancher Battle Card Game
2000	Monster Rancher Battle Card Episode II
2000	Monster Rancher Hop-A-Bout
2000	Monster Rancher Explorer
2001	Monster Rancher 3
2001	Monster Rancher Advance
2002	Monster Rancher Advance 2
2003	Monster Rancher 4
2004
2005	Monster Rancher EVO
2006
2007	Kaite Shabette Hajimeyou!: Monster Farm DS
2008	Monster Rancher DS
2009–2011
2012	Monster Rancher 1 Million
2012	My Monster Rancher
2013–2020
2021	Monster Rancher 1 & 2 DX
2022	Ultra Kaiju Monster Rancher

Monster Rancher is often compared to Pokémon, though the two series play differently. While the Pokémon games are traditionally collection-based role-playing video games, Monster Rancher games tend to be simulated animal breeding games. The genre Monster Rancher occupies is shared by other simulation virtual pet games, such as Digimon, and games based on raising horses for racing, like in the Gallop Racer series, also by Tecmo.

In the games, the player takes the role of a monster breeder whose goal is to raise monsters to fight in tournaments. The breeder must raise the monster throughout its life, training it, keeping it healthy, making an exercise schedule, and trying to maximize its abilities before it dies of old age or is retired. Monsters have good or bad morale depending on how they are raised; loyal monsters are more likely to listen to commands, while disloyal monsters might refuse to obey commands or not fight at all. Famous monsters are more likely to land critical hits. Retired monsters can be combined to create more powerful monsters.

=== Monster generation ===
In Monster Rancher, Monster Rancher 2, Monster Rancher 3, Monster Rancher 4, and Monster Rancher EVO, the player can generate a new monster to use by inserting any CD into their video game console. Monster Rancher 3, Monster Rancher 4, and Monster Rancher EVO can also use DVDs.

The characteristics of the monster (such as stats, breed and traits) are determined by various numbers stored in the game. To generate a monster, a random number generator is needed to define what characteristics the monster will have. Tecmo created a CD-reading system that would use the discs to generate random number seeds and, consequently, a large variety of random monsters. The values found in the discs' data are mapped to monster characteristics.

Some discs are designed to produce specific monsters, often thematically related to the disc in question. For instance, in Monster Rancher 4, the Harry Potter and the Chamber of Secrets DVD (as well as the tie-in PlayStation 2 game) generates a unique owl monster, and in Monster Rancher 2 and Monster Rancher 4, Tecmo's Dead or Alive game creates a Pixie named Kasumi. Special CDs, called "pandora discs", can produce multiple monsters. Often, the Monster Rancher game CD itself is a pandora disc.

==== Different generation methods ====
In most modern Monster Rancher games, monster generation no longer uses discs, or at least make them less important; this is due to the waning popularity and production of the format.

In Monster Rancher Advance and Monster Rancher Advance 2, the system generates random monsters by using character sequences rather than CDs, due to the limitations of the Game Boy Advance game cartridges. Certain combinations of characters will determine the monster's breed, sub-breed, stats, and traits. Codes found in-game can be used to generate rare monsters.

In Monster Rancher DS and Monster Rancher DS 2, the system is revised to take advantage of the Nintendo DS's input devices. Monsters can be generated by speaking into the microphone, drawing figures on the bottom screen, or inserting a Game Boy Advance game cartridge into the second slot.

In Monster Farm Online, players select a monster species they have some knowledge of, with the basic purebreeds automatically available, then insert a disc to create their traits. This is so that players do not need to find a disc that is unique to one particular territory to get the rarest monsters.

In Monster Rancher 1 & 2 DX, a modern remaster of Monster Rancher 1 and 2, the disc system from the original games is replaced with a digital database of CDs, DVDs, music, and video games. Instead of inserting a disc, the player enters a query for Title, Artist, or both, and chooses from a list of media, from which the monster assigned to the selected media will be generated. The monsters assigned to each media are the same across all copies; for example, selecting the album Trouble by Whitesnake always generates the "Swimmer" variant of the Mew monster, which can also be generated from other media.

In Ultra Kaiju Monster Rancher, an Ultraman-themed spinoff of the series, the generation system uses NFC devices (such as mobile phones, payment cards, and transit passes) alongside special codes, a keyword input menu, and the digital database from 1 & 2 DX.

== Game releases ==
=== PlayStation ===
- Monster Rancher
- Monster Rancher 2
- Monster Rancher Hop-A-Bout
- Monster Rancher Battle Card Episode II

=== Game Boy Color ===
- Monster Rancher Battle Card GB
- Monster Rancher Explorer

=== PlayStation 2 ===
- Monster Rancher 3
- Monster Rancher 4
- Monster Rancher EVO

=== Game Boy Advance ===
- Monster Rancher Advance
- Monster Rancher Advance 2

=== Nintendo DS ===
- Kaite Shabette Hajimeyou!: Monster Farm DS (Japan only)
- Monster Rancher DS (known as Monster Farm DS 2: Yomigaeru! Master Breeder Densetsu in Japan)

=== Nintendo Switch ===
- Monster Rancher
- Monster Rancher 2
- Ultra Kaiju Monster Rancher

=== Nintendo Switch 2 ===
- Console Archives Monster Jump Farm (published by Hamster)

=== Microsoft Windows ===
- Monster Farm Online (Japan only)
- Monster Rancher
- Monster Rancher 2

=== Android & iOS ===
- My Monster Rancher
- Monster Rancher 1 Million
- Monster Farm POP (Japan only)
- Monster Farm POP 2 (Japan only)
- Monster Rancher
- Monster Rancher 2

== Anime ==
Monster Rancher is an anime series based on the Monster Rancher video games. A total of 73 episodes were produced over 2 series, which were split into 3 seasons for the English release, airing from 1999 to 2000. It originally aired in Japan on TBS, in the United States on Fox Kids and Fox Family Channel, in the United Kingdom on CBBC, and in Canada on YTV.

Additionally, in Japan, an original video animation tie-in to the Monster Rancher EVO, entitled Monster Farm 5: Circus Caravan Original Animation- Kessei!! Orcoro Circus (モンスターファーム5 サーカスキャラバン オリジナルアニメーション 「結成!!オルコロサーカス」, Monsutā Fāmu Faibu Sākasu Kyaraban Orijinaru Animēshon "Kessei!! Orukoro Sākasu) was released.

== Reception ==
Aggregate review scores As of February 4, 2017.
Game	GameRankings	Metacritic
Monster Rancher	79.50%	86
Monster Rancher 2	78.69%	83
Monster Rancher Battle Card Game	64.00%	-
Monster Rancher Battle Card: Episode II	66.13%	-
Monster Rancher Hop-A-Bout	70.00%	-
Monster Rancher Explorer	69.20%	-
Monster Rancher 3	78.03%	77
Monster Rancher Advance	78.36%	83
Monster Rancher Advance 2	78.11%	79
Monster Rancher 4	77.42%	77
Monster Rancher EVO	57.81%	58
Monster Rancher DS	59.40%	58
My Monster Rancher	70.00%	-

The Monster Rancher series has received overall positive reviews.
