= Tecmo =

Japanese video game company

Tecmo, Ltd.
- Native name: 株式会社テクモ
- Romanized name: Kabushikigaisha Tekumo
- Formerly: Imperial Trustee Corporation (1964–1977); Tehkan (1977–1986)
- Type: Kabushiki gaisha Subsidiary
- Industry: Video games
- Predecessors: Imperial Trustee Corporation; Nippon Yacht Co, Ltd
- Founded: July 31, 1967; 59 years ago
- Founder: Yoshihito Kakihara
- Defunct: April 1, 2010; 16 years ago
- Fate: Merged with Koei
- Successor: Koei Tecmo Games
- Headquarters: Tokyo, Japan
- Key people: Junji Nakamura; Tomonobu Itagaki
- Products: Bomb Jack; Captain Tsubasa; Ninja Gaiden; Dead or Alive; Fatal Frame; Tecmo Bowl; Rio; Deception; Monster Rancher; Rygar; Gallop Racer; Solomon's Key
- Parent: Koei Tecmo (2009–2010)
- Website: http://www.tecmo.co.jp/sub_index.html

Tecmo, Ltd. (テクモ株式会社, Tekumo kabushikigaisha) was a Japanese video game company that was headquartered in the Kudankita district of Tokyo. Originating in 1967, it was known as Tehkan prior to 1986. Its American subsidiary, Tecmo Inc, was located in Torrance, California. Tecmo is best known for having created and developed the action series Ninja Gaiden, the survival horror series Fatal Frame/Project Zero, the fighting series Dead or Alive, and the American football series Tecmo Bowl.

In 2009, Tecmo merged with Koei to form the holding company Tecmo Koei Holdings and was operated as a subsidiary until April 2010 when Tecmo was dissolved. Its brand continued to be used until 2016. Its video game franchises are now owned and published by Koei Tecmo Games.

== History ==
The company was founded on July 31, 1967, as Tehkan, primarily producing cleaning equipment. By 1969, it started to sell amusement equipment.

=== Early history ===
Tecmo Ltd., which merged with Koei in 2009, was itself the combination of two companies: Imperial Trustee Corporation (founded in 1964) and Nippon Yacht Co, Ltd (founded in 1967).

==== Imperial Trustee Corporation ====
The origins of Tecmo dates to September 1964 as the Imperial Trustee Corporation, a company specialized in the management of building maintenance including the supplying of cleaning equipment. In July 1969, the company started to sell entertainment amusement equipment and opened its first self-managed amusement facility in March 1970 in Chiba Prefecture.

In October 1977, the Imperial Trustee Corporation was renamed "Tehkan Ltd", with the trade name changed as well to "Tehkan". Tehkan is derived from the name "Teikoku Kanzai" (帝国管財), the company's original Japanese name.

In March 1981, a U.S. division was inaugurated in Los Angeles as "U.S. Tehkan, Inc.". A month later, in April 1981, Tehkan released in Japan its first internally developed arcade video game, titled "Pleiads" (which was distributed in America by Centuri).

On January 8, 1986, Tehkan Ltd officially changed its name to Tecmo Ltd. The company's first internally developed home video game Mighty Bomb Jack was released for the Family Computer in April 1986.

==== Nippon Yacht Co, Ltd ====
On July 31, 1967, the Nippon Yacht Corporation was established to handle the real estate of ships.

On December 6, 1982, Nippon Yacht Co, Ltd was renamed "Tehkan Electronics Corporation".

=== Merger of Tecmo and Tehkan Electronics Corporation. Focus on console video games ===
On April 1, 1987, Tecmo Ltd. merged with its sister company Tehkan Electronics Corporation. The former's name was retained for the merger but the latter was the actual surviving company.

By the turn of the decade, Tecmo was firmly in the camp of video game consoles. Though still involved in the arcade industry, much of the success was achieved on the Nintendo Entertainment System with titles such as Ninja Gaiden, Tecmo Bowl and the Japan-only Tsuppari Ōzumō. When Sony released its PlayStation in the 1990s, Tecmo joined the endeavor which set the tone for series such as Dead or Alive, Monster Rancher, Deception and Gallop Racer.

Tecmo enters the second section of Tokyo Stock Exchange in March 2000 and transitioned to the first section in March 2001.

On October 1, 2001, Tecmo founder, Yoshihito Kakihara, steps down as president and representative director due to health issues. Kakihara becomes chairman and representative director while vice president, Junji Nakamura, becomes president and representative director. By 2002, Tecmo stopped producing new arcade games.

On January 1, 2006, Tecmo president, Junji Nakamura, steps down while Yoshimi Yasuda was named his successor. Nakamura becomes chairman of Tecmo until his resignation from the company on February 1, 2006.

On July 18, 2006, Tecmo's founder, Yoshihito Kakihara, died of interstitial pneumonia at the age of 67.

Tecmo delisted from the Tokyo Stock Exchange on March 26, 2009, right before the merger with Koei took effect.

=== Lawsuits ===
On February 14, 2007, former president, Junji Nakamura, filed a lawsuit against Tecmo demanding payment of 166 million yen in executive retirement benefits. A settlement in the matter was reached on March 28.

On June 3, 2008, Team Ninja head Tomonobu Itagaki resigned from the company and filed a 145 million yen ($1.4 million) lawsuit against Tecmo president, Yoshimi Yasuda, for "unpaid completion bonuses" and "emotional distress". This was followed by another lawsuit filed on 16 June by two plaintiffs on behalf of Tecmo's 300 employees for unpaid wages amounting to ¥8.3 million.

=== Merger with Koei ===
On August 20, 2008, Tecmo announced the resignation of president Yoshimi Yasuda, to be replaced by current chairman of the board Yasuharu Kakihara as of September 1. On August 29, 2008 Square Enix made plans for a friendly takeover of Tecmo by purchasing shares at a 30 percent premium with a total bid of ¥22.3 billion. On September 4, 2008, Tecmo officially declined the takeover proposal. Tecmo subsequently engaged in talks with Koei about a possible merger between the two companies, and agreed in November 2008 to merge on April 1, 2009, to form Tecmo Koei Holdings.

On January 26, 2009, the two companies officially announced the merger, and the holding company formed on April 1, 2009, as planned. Tecmo initially continued to be operated as a subsidiary and brandname of Tecmo Koei Holdings. In January 2010, the United States subsidiaries of Tecmo Inc. and Koei America merged to create Tecmo Koei America Corporation.

Tecmo was effectively declared disbanded in Japan on April 1, 2010, as part of a major international reorganization within Tecmo Koei Holdings. Relevant intellectual properties were slated to be further managed by Koei Tecmo Games.

On March 15, 2010, and roughly two weeks before Tecmo was dissolved, its internal development studio was spun off as a separate company under the name of "Tecmo Co, Ltd.", a wholly owned subsidiary of Koei Tecmo Games. This new company was initially called "Tehkan" to avoid confusion with the other company that was still operating for another two weeks. When Tecmo disbanded on April 1, 2010, Tekhan was renamed Tecmo. This was short-lived as the new Tecmo along with the new Koei video game developers were both dissolved and merged into Koei Tecmo Games a year later, on April 1, 2011.

Despite having been dissolved twice as a legal entity, Tecmo continued to appear as a label on video games by Koei Tecmo Games until another corporate reorganization in 2016 abandoned the brand name for good. Video games by Koei Tecmo Games marketed with the Tecmo logotype included Dead or Alive 5, Ninja Gaiden 3: Razor's Edge and Deception IV: The Nightmare Princess.

== Divisions ==
- Team Ninja, started in 1995.
- Team Tachyon, started in 2007.

== Games ==
Tecmo has published various video games and some of the franchises include Captain Tsubasa, Dead or Alive, Deception, Fatal Frame, Gallop Racer, Monster Rancher, Ninja Gaiden, Rygar, Star Force and Tecmo Bowl. When it was still called Tehkan, the company released arcade games such as Bomb Jack, Gridiron Fight and Tehkan World Cup.
