= Captain Tsubasa 5: Hasha no Shōgō Campione =

1994 video game

- Cover art
- Developer: Tecmo
- Publisher: Tecmo
- Programmers: Hiromitsu Mikawa; Hiroyuki Matsumoto; Makoto Yazaki
- Composers: Hiroshi Miyazaki; Chinatsu Okayasu
- Series: Captain Tsubasa
- Platform: Super Famicom
- Release: JP: December 9, 1994
- Genre: Traditional soccer simulation
- Modes: Single-player, multiplayer

Captain Tsubasa 5: Hasha no Shōgō Campione (キャプテン翼V 覇者の称号カンピオーネ, "Captain Tsubasa V Campione Champion Title") is the fifth and final installment of Tecmo's Captain Tsubasa video game series. It is a sequel of Captain Tsubasa 4: Pro no Rival Tachi and was released exclusively in Japan for Nintendo's Super Famicom on December 9, 1994.

== Summary ==
The game differs greatly from its "Cinematic Soccer" oriented predecessors. It adopts a new gameplay with a classic view of the pitch and improved graphics. It features various RPG elements with special techniques of characters, known from Captain Tsubasa manga and anime series. Players strongly resembling real-life stars of the time: Thomas Häßler, Júlio César da Silva, Jean-Pierre Papin, Peter Schmeichel, Franco Baresi, Ronald Koeman, Tomas Brolin, Dennis Bergkamp, or Gabriel Batistuta are present in the game. Tecmo also introduced its own characters, like Brazilian ace Signori, skilful forward Alcion, and world class goalkeeper Savičević, among others.

The game's story mode focuses mainly on Tsubasa's Serie A season with Lecce and international campaign with Japan. In addition, other characters like Kojiro Hyuga, Genzo Wakabayashi, Lui Napoleón, Carlos Santana or Karl-Heinz Schneider have their less-expanded scenarios as well. The competitions in the game are based on real major international tournaments, like Asian Cup, Copa América and World Cup. In the All-star mode, the players can create new characters, arrange a friendly match (with all the teams, or by composing an own squad from all the players available in the game) and create a league with national or club teams.

== Selected characters ==
- (Brazil) Arantes (アランチス) — based on football legend Pelé; he plays for Canarinho Stars - the strongest team in the game, which consists of players inspired by classic Brazilian stars: Garrincha, Gilmar, Rivellino or Zico; he does not possess any special techniques, but his individual attributes are extremely high.
- Díaz (ディアス) — playmaker and leader of Albicelestes, loosely based on Diego Maradona; Díaz has five different shot techniques and a combination technique with teammate Alan Pascal - Argentina Combi.
- (Netherlands) Furia (フーリア) — skilful midfielder of AC Milan, inspired by Dutch Ballon d'Or winner Ruud Gullit.
- (Brazil) Joan (ジョアン) — coach of Campione and former tutor of Roberto Hongo; taught his best players (Nitta, Alcion and Signori) the unique technique - Geijutsu Teki Dribble.
- (Nigeria) Kanu (カヌー) — player with decent technique, based on Nwankwo Kanu from 1993 FIFA U-17 World Championship winning team; characters resembling other members of that squad: Wilson Oruma and Celestine Babayaro are also present in the game.
- Kusta (クスタ) — arguably the best defender in the game, he plays for Malaysia and Campione; hard to beat due to his special defensive techniques: block, charge and tackle.
- (Germany) Schneider, Karl-Heinz (カール・ハインツ・シュナイダー) — world-class forward with total of 8 special techniques, including potent Neofire Shot; Schneider plays for Bayern Munich and is one of Tsubasa's greatest rivals.
- (Brazil) Signori (シニョーリ) — one of the most important characters in this instalment of the game; arrogant Brazilian midfielder/forward with effective dribble and trademark Axel Spin Shot, Signori plays for Seleção and Parma.
- Stratto (ストラット) — star player of AC Milan and Italy, known from Captain Tsubasa 4; he is able to beat most of goalkeepers with his powerful Megaton Shot.
- (Netherlands) Van Berg (ファン・ベルグ) — based on Marco van Basten; possess very good shot technique and heading ability; despite his great skills, he is only substitute at Milan. At the time of the release of the game, Van Basten was seriously injured, which resulted in his early retirement.

== Teams ==
Teams with * need to be unlocked to be playable on All-Stars mode.

=== Original Captain Tsubasa teams ===
- (Japan) Nankatsu SC
- (Japan) Toho FC

=== Club teams ===
- (Brazil) Portuguesa
- (Brazil) São Paulo
- (Italy) Fiorentina*
- (Italy) Genoa*
- (Italy) Inter*
- (Italy) Juventus*
- (Italy) Lecce*
- (Italy) Milan*
- (Italy) Parma*
- (Italy) Roma*
- (Italy) Sampdoria*
- (Italy) Torino*
- (Germany) FC Köln*
- (Germany) Bayern Munich*
- (Germany) Eintracht Frankfurt
- (Germany) Hamburger SV*
- (Germany) Werder Bremen
- (Germany) Stuttgart
- (France) Bordeaux
- (France) Paris Saint-Germain*
- (England) Manchester United*
- (Netherlands) Feyenoord*
- Campione*

=== National teams ===
==== CONMEBOL ====
- Argentina*
- Bolivia
- Brazil*
- Chile
- Uruguay*
- Venezuela

==== CONCACAF ====
- United States

==== UEFA ====
- France
- Germany*
- Italy*
- Netherlands*

==== CAF ====
- Ghana*
- Morocco
- Nigeria*

==== AFC ====
- Iraq*
- Japan
- (South Korea) Korea*
- Malaysia*
- Philippines
- Qatar*
- Saudi Arabia*
- United Arab Emirates*

=== Others ===
- Complete Japan*
- (Brazil) Canarinho Stars*
- (Japan) Ichigaya Kingdom*

== Voices ==
- Alcion (Kōichi Hashimoto)
- Genzo Wakabayashi (Kōichi Hashimoto)
- Karl-Heinz Schneider (Keiichi Nanba)
- Ken Wakashimazu (Nobuo Tobita)
- Kojiro Hyuga (Hirotaka Suzuoki)
- Taro Misaki (Eiko Yamada)
- Tsubasa Oozora (Yōko Ogai)

== Critical reception ==
The game received good reviews and still remains popular among Captain Tsubasa fans. The Japanese website Wazap! gave this game a total score of 78.7 out of 100.

== Guide book ==
On January 15, 1995, Shueisha published a 104 pages guide book from V Jump, featuring players' profiles, extensive in-game strategies, and a fold-out mini-poster.

== Possible sequel ==
During the story mode there were two explicit references that could foresee a possible sequel: the Dutch Van Berg challenging Tsubasa after the match against the Netherlands, when he refers to a new super shot that he has developed, and especially the rant of an angry Alcion after the final match, where he explicitly states a revenge in Captain Tsubasa 6. Tecmo has not developed any Captain Tsubasa game with those characters after this installment.

== Translations ==
The game was unofficially translated into various languages: English, Brazilian Portuguese, Italian, Spanish, Chinese or Arabic. The translations were not authorized by Nintendo.

== See also ==
- List of Captain Tsubasa characters
- Top Striker
- Ace Striker
- Super Formation Soccer 95: della Serie A
- Hat Trick Hero 2
