= Ōzora (disambiguation) =

Ōzora is a town in Abashiri District, Okhotsk Subprefecture, Hokkaidō, Japan.

Ōzora may also refer to:

- Ōzora (surname), a Japanese surname
- Ohzora Publishing, a josei manga publisher in Japan
- Ohzora (satellite), a Japanese weather satellite
- 5214 Oozora, an asteroid
- Ōzora (train), a JR Hokkaido train service

== See also ==
- Ozora, a Hungarian village
- Ózora or Usora, a historic region in Bosnia
- Ozora, Missouri, a populated place in the United States
- Aozora (disambiguation), Japanese word for blue sky
