= Aozora =

Aozora (Japanese for "blue sky") may refer to:

- Aozora Bank, a Japanese bank
- Aozora Bunko, a Japanese online literature library
- Aozora Records, a Japanese record company

== Songs ==
- "Aozora no Namida", a song by Hitomi Takahashi
- "Aozora", a song by Utaibito Hane
- "Aozora", a song by Shiina Ringo
- "Aozora" (song), a song by the band The Blue Hearts
- "Aozora", a song from the Aya Ueto album Message
- "Aozora", a song by Eikichi Yazawa
- "Aozora", a song by Ken Hirai
- "Aozora", a song by Miwa (singer)
- "Aozora kataomoi", a song by SKE48
- "Aozora no Soba ni Ite", a song by AKB48
- "Aozora", a song by Karnivool

== Art ==
- Aozora, a manga film by Naoki Yamamoto
- Aozora Shōjotai, an anime series released as 801 T.T.S. Airbats outside Japan

== See also ==
- Ōzora (disambiguation), Japanese word for extensive sky
