= List of Captain Tsubasa chapters =

Captain Tsubasa is a Japanese manga series written and illustrated by Yōichi Takahashi. The series focuses on the development of a young Japanese football soccer player named Tsubasa Oozora who joins the Nankatsu elementary school's football team. The series was serialized in Shueisha's magazine Weekly Shōnen Jump between 1981 and 1988.

It was collected in a total of 37 tankōbon volumes that were published between January 1982 and March 1989. In 1997, Shueisha started rereleasing the series in bunkoban volumes. They were rereleased from December 8, 1997, to February 18, 1999. Takahashi also wrote multiple sequels in the following years that followed Tsubasa's career.

== Volumes ==
No.	Japanese release date	Japanese ISBN
1	January 9, 1982	4-08-851281-2
01. "Soar Toward The Great Sky!" (大空へはばたけ!の巻, "Ōzora he Habatake! no Maki"); 02. "Take Flight!" (とんだっ!の巻, "Ton da?! no Maki"); 03. "New Nankatsu Gradeschool Football Club, Start!" (ニュー南葛小サッカー部スタートの巻, "Nyū Nankatsu Shō Sakkā Bu Sutāto no Maki"); 04. "The Great Responsibility of the Football Club" (責任重大サッカー部の巻, "Sekinin Jūdai Sakkā Bu no Maki")
2	May 10, 1982	4-08-851282-0
05. "Tsubasa the Sweeper" (スイーパー翼!の巻, "Suīpā Tsubasa! no Maki"); 06. "Fate's Long Shot" (運命のロングシュートの巻, "Unmei no Rongu Shūto no Maki"); 07. "I Am Misaki Taro" (ボクは岬太郎の巻, "Boku ha Misaki Tarō no Maki"); 08. "Invigorating Last Scene" (さわやかな幕切れの巻, "Sawayaka na Makugire no Maki")
3	August 10, 1982	4-08-851283-9
09. "Roberto's Surprising Request" (ロベルトの意外な申し出の巻, "Roberuto no Igai na Mōshide no Maki"); 10. "Kojiro's Appearance" (小次郎あらわるの巻, "Kojirō Ara Waru no Maki"); 11. "Everyone's New Trip" (それぞれの旅立ちの巻, "Sorezore no Tabidachi no Maki"); 12. "A Surprisingly Difficult Match" (思わぬ苦戦の巻, "Omowa nu Kusen no Maki"); 13. "Game Maker Tsubasa" (ゲームメーカー翼の巻, "Gēmu Mēkā Tsubasa no Maki")
4	November 10, 1982	4-08-851284-7
14. "Who Is That Girl?" (あの子はだーれ？の巻, "Ano ko ha Dāre? no Maki"); 15. "Now It's The Entire Country!" (さあ全国だ!の巻, "Sā Zenkoku da! no Maki"); 16. "The New Captain, Tsubasa" (新キャプテン翼の巻, "Shin Kyaputen Tsubasa no Maki"); 17. "Drawing Of Lots' Mischief" (燃えろ南葛!の巻, "Moero Minami Kazura! no Maki"); 18. "Burn Nankatsu! To Beat Meiwa!!" (明和を倒せ!!の巻, "Meiwa o Taose!! no Maki")
5	February 10, 1983	4-08-851285-5
19. "The Fierce Tiger's Terrible Counterattack" (おそるべき猛虎の逆襲の巻, "Osorubeki Mōko no Gyakushū no Maki"); 20. "You Must Not Fear Your Friend, The Ball!" (ボールはともだちこわくない!の巻, "Bōru ha Tomodachi Kowaku nai! no Maki"); 21. "I Can't Lose Because of My Dream" (夢だから負けない!の巻, "Yume da Kara Make nai! no Maki"); 22. "The Unexpected Ambush" (意外な伏兵の巻, "Igai na Fukuhei no Maki"); 23. "Show Your Talent! Soccer Child" (本領発揮だ! サッカー小僧の巻, "Honryō Hakki da! Sakkā Kozō no Maki")
6	May 10, 1983	4-08-851286-3
24. "Ishizaki's Big Mistake" (石崎の大チョンボ!の巻, "Ishizaki no dai Chonbo! no Maki"); 25. "Last 4 Minutes! Decisive Battle In The Air" (のこり4分! 空中決戦の巻, "No Kori 4 Fun! Kūchū Kessen no Maki"); 26. "Now Let's Go! The Decisive Tournament" (さあ いくぞ! 決勝トーナメントの巻, "Sā Ikuzo! Kesshō Tōnamento no Maki"); 27. "Ace of Glass Jun Misugi" (ガラスのエース JUN（ジュン） MISUGI（ミスギ）の巻, "Garasu no Ēsu JUN (Jun) MISUGI (Misugi) no Maki")
7	August 10, 1983	4-08-851287-1
28. "Fierce Fighting! Meiwa vs Furano" (激闘! 明和V.S.富良野の巻, Gekitō! Meiwa V. S. Furano no Maki"); 29. "Dream Confrontation's Kick Off!" (夢の対決 さあキックオフ!の巻, Yume no Taiketsu Sā Kikkuofu! no Maki")
8	November 10, 1983	4-08-851288-X
30. "Musashi's Secret Plan" (武蔵の秘策の巻, "Musashi no Hisaku no Maki"); 31. "Tsubasa Can't Fly" (とべない翼の巻, "Tobe nai Tsubasa no Maki"); 32. "Ace Rebirth" (エース復活!!の巻, "Ēsu Fukkatsu!! no Maki"); 33. "Challenge to His Life's Longevity!" (延命への挑戦!の巻, "Enmei he no Chōsen! no Maki")
9	February 10, 1984	4-08-851289-8
34. "It Won't Be My Farewell Match" (さよならゲームにしたくない!!の巻, "Sayonara Gēmu ni Shi Taku nai!! no Maki"); 35. "Now to the Finals" (いざ 決勝戦!!の巻, "Iza Kesshō Sen!! no Maki"); 36. "Genius Keeper Returns" (天才キーパー復活の巻, "Tensai Kīpā Fukkatsu no Maki"); 37. "Unexpected Goal" (思わぬゴール!の巻, "Omowa nu Gōru! no Maki")
10	June 8, 1984	4-08-851290-1
38. "Elimination of an Ace" (エース失格!?の巻, "Ēsu Shikkaku!? no Maki"); 39. "Half-time's End" (最後のハーフタイムの巻, "Saigo no Hāfutaimu no Maki"); 40. "Tenacity, Definitely Tenacity" (執念…まさに執念!!の巻, "Shūnen... Masani Shūnen!! no Maki"); 41. "We'll Do It!" (おれたちがやるんだ!!の巻, "Ore Tachi ga Yarun da!! no Maki"); 42. "Blazing Counter Attack" (炎のカウンターアタックの巻, "Honō no Kauntā Atakku no Maki")
11	August 10, 1984	4-08-851291-X
43. "The Last of the Last One Chance!" (最後の最後のワンチャンス!の巻, "Saigo no Saigo no Wan Chansu! no Maki"); 44. "Extra Time's Kickoff" (延長戦キックオフの巻, "Enchō Sen Kikkuofu no Maki"); 45. "Will to Fight for Victory" (勝利への闘志!!の巻, "Shōri he no Tōshi!! no Maki")
12	November 9, 1984	4-08-851292-8
46. "Defend! Nankatsu" (守れ! 南葛の巻, "Mamore! Minami Kazura no Maki"); 47. "The Last Golden Combi Play" (最後の黄金コンビプレイの巻, "Saigo no Ōgon Konbi Purei no Maki"); 48. "Moment of Glory" (栄光の瞬間の巻, "Eikō no Shunkan no Maki"); 49. "Sudden Good-bye" (突然のサヨナラの巻, "Totsuzen no Sayonara no Maki")
13	January 10, 1985	4-08-851293-6
50. "Everyone's Setting Off" (それぞれの旅立ちの巻, "Sorezore no Tabidachi no Maki"); 51. "Opening Ceremony" (始業式の巻, "Shigyō Shiki no Maki"); 52. "Ootomo's Challenge" (大友中の挑戦の巻, "Ōtomo Chū no Chōsen no Maki"); 53. "Summer's Start" (夏の開幕!!の巻, "Natsu no Kaimaku!! no Maki")
14	April 10, 1985	4-08-851294-4
54. "Rival's Burning Gaze" (ライバルたちの熱いまなざしの巻, "Raibaru Tachi no Atsui Manazashi no Maki"); 55. "Hayabusa vs Tsubasa" (隼対翼の巻, "Hayabusa tai Tsubasa no Maki")
15	July 10, 1985	4-08-851295-2
56. "Hyuga vs Misugi" (日向対三杉の巻(1), "Hyuga tai Misugi no Maki (1)"); 57. "Hyuga vs Misugi 2" (日向対三杉の巻(2), "Hyuga tai Misugi no Maki (2)"); 58. "Meeting In Foreign Land" (異郷の出会いの巻, "Ikyō no Deai no Maki"); 59. "Reborn In The Middle Of The Storm" (嵐の中の復活の巻, "Arashi no Naka no Fukkatsu no Maki")
16	October 10, 1985	4-08-851296-0
60. "Kamisori Power Explosion" (カミソリパワー爆発の巻, "Kamisori Pawā Bakuhatsu no Maki"); 61. "Ace's Specialty" (エースの本領!の巻, "Ēsu no Honryō! no Maki"); 62. "Everyone's Decision" (それぞれの決意の巻, "Sorezore no Ketsui no Maki"); 63. "The New Wondrous Air Combi Play" (奇跡の新空中コンビプレイの巻, "Kiseki no Shin Kūchū Konbipurei no Maki")
17	December 6, 1985	4-08-851297-9
64. "To The Battlefield Again!!" (戦場へふたたび!!の巻, "Senjō he Futatabi!! no Maki"); 65. "Furano Goes To The Front" (ふらの出陣!!の巻, "Fura no Shutsujin!! no Maki")
18	January 10, 1986	4-08-851298-7
66. "The Fearful Dark Horse" (恐怖の伏兵ダークホースツーの巻, "Kyōfu no Fukuhei Dākuhōsutsū no Maki"); 67. "Phoenix Tsubasa" (不死鳥・翼の巻, "Fushichō.Tsubasa no Maki")
19	March 10, 1986	4-08-851299-5
68. "Undying Team Work" (不滅のチームワークの巻, "Fumetsu no Chīmuwāku no Maki"); 69. "Semi Finals' Outbreaks" (準決勝開戦の巻, "Junkesshō Kaisen no Maki"); 70. "The Fierce Tiger Encouragements" (猛虎ゲキる!の巻, "Mōko Gekiru! no Maki"); 71. "Number 10 vs Number 10" (背番号10対背番号10の巻, "Sebangō 10 tai Sebangō 10 no Maki")
20	May 9, 1986	4-08-851300-2
72. "Oath To Reverse The Score" (逆転への誓いの巻, "Gyakuten he no Chikai no Maki"); 73. "Collective Attack" (攻撃も全員で!!の巻, "Kōgeki mo Zenin de!! no Maki"); 74. "The Phoenix Flew" (不死鳥とんだ…の巻, "Fushichō Ton da... no Maki"); 75. "The Fierce Tiger's Written Challenge" (猛虎の挑戦状の巻, "Mōko no Chōsen Jō no Maki")
21	July 10, 1986	4-08-851871-3
76. "Kick-Off of the Century" (世紀のキックオフの巻, "Seiki no Kikkuofu no Maki"); 77. "The New Destined Confrontation" (宿命の対決ふたたびの巻, "Shukumei no Taiketsu Futatabi no Maki")
22	September 10, 1986	4-08-851872-1
78. "The King Toho" (王者・東邦!!の巻, "Ōja.Tōhō!! no Maki"); 79. "At Last We Break Into The Second Half" (ついに後半戦突入!の巻, "Tsuini Kōhan sen Totsunyū! no Maki")
23	November 10, 1986	4-08-851873-X
80. "Incandescent Fighters, The Fierce Tiger And Tsubasa" (灼熱の闘士 猛虎&翼!!の巻, "Shakunetsu no Tōshi Mōko & Tsubasa!! no Maki")
24	January 9, 1987	4-08-851874-8
81. "The Setting Off Goal!" (旅立ちのゴールへ!の巻, "Tabidachi no Gōru he! no Maki"); 82. "Miracle Drive Shoot" (ミラクルドライブシュートの巻, "Mirakuru Doraibu Shūto no Maki"); 83. "V1 Versus V3" (V1対V3の巻, "V1 tai V3 no Maki")
25	March 10, 1987	4-08-851875-6
84. "Departure for Tomorrow" (明日への旅立ちの巻, "Ashita he no Tabidachi no Maki"); 85. "The Start Of A New Challenge" (新たなる挑戦スタートの巻, "Arata Naru Chōsen Sutāto no Maki")
26	May 8, 1987	4-08-851876-4
86. "Greeting From An Old Enemy" (旧敵へのあいさつの巻, "Kyū Teki he no Aisatsu no Maki"); 87. "A Pro Player" (プロの戦士!!の巻, "Puro no Senshi!! no Maki")
27	July 10, 1987	4-08-851877-2
88. "Starting Afresh From Zero" (ゼロからの再出発の巻, "Zero Kara no sai Shuppatsu no Maki"); 89. "Another Strong Player" (もうひとりの実力者の巻, "Mō Hitori no Jitsuryoku Sha no Maki")
28	September 10, 1987	4-08-851878-0
90. "Big Gathering In Paris!!" (パリ大集結!!の巻, "Pari dai Shūketsu!! no Maki"); 91. "The Great Setting Off" (大いなる旅立ちの巻, "Ōinaru Tabidachi no Maki")
29	November 10, 1987	4-08-851879-9
92. "Perfect Come-Back! Golden Combi" (完全復活! 黄金コンビ!!の巻, "Kanzen Fukkatsu! Ōgon Konbi!! no Maki"); 93. "Oath In The Starry Sky" (星空の誓いの巻, "Hoshizora no Chikai no Maki")
30	January 8, 1988	4-08-851880-2
94. "Never Give Up" (ネバーギブアップの巻, "Nebā Gibu Appu no Maki")
31	March 10, 1988	4-08-851881-0
95. "The Young Noble's Come-Back" (貴公子復活!!の巻, "Kikōshi Fukkatsu!! no Maki"); 96. "True Colors Of The Fireball" (火の玉の正体の巻, "Hinotama no Shōtai no Maki"); 97. "Now, The Phantom" (幻が今…!!の巻, "Maboroshi ga Ima...!! no Maki"); 98. "The War Starts!! Japan vs France" (開戦!! 日本対フランスの巻, "Kaisen!! Nippon tai Furansu no Maki")
32	May 10, 1988	4-08-851882-9
99. "Attack Of The Beautiful Beast" (美獣の来襲の巻, "Bi Jū no Raishū no Maki")
33	July 8, 1988	4-08-851883-7
100. "The Last Bet of Misaki" (岬の最後のかけの巻, "Misaki no Saigo no Kake no Maki"); 101. "A Bloodstained Desperate Defense" (血まみれの死守の巻の巻, "Chimamire no Shishu no Maki"); 102. "The Miraculous Fist" (奇跡をよぶ拳の巻の巻, "Kiseki o Yobu Kobushi no Maki")
34	September 9, 1988	4-08-851884-5
103. "The Lions Of The Final" (決勝の獅子たち！の巻, "Kesshō no Shishi Tachi! no Maki"); 104. "Flaming First Goal" (炎の先取点の巻, "En no Senshu Ten no Maki")
35	November 10, 1988	4-08-851885-3
105. "The Strongest Shoot In History" (史上最強のシュートの巻, Shijō Saikyō no Shūto no Maki"); 106. "Answer The Message" (メッセージにこたえろ！の巻, Messēji ni Kotaero! no Maki"); 107. "The Best Of The World Is Appearing!?" (世界一がみえた!?の巻, Sekai Ichi ga Mie ta!? no Maki")
36	January 10, 1989	4-08-851886-1
108. "An Oath Made to the Sky" (大空への誓いの巻, "Ōzora he no Chikai no Maki"); 109. "Confessions" (告白！の巻, "Kokuhaku! no Maki")
37	March 10, 1989	4-08-851887-X
110. "Everyone's New Start" (それぞれの旅立ちの巻, "Sorezore no Tabidachi no Maki"); 111. "Tsubasa's Dream" (翼への夢の巻, "Tsubasa he no Yume no Maki"); 112. "Towards A New Era" (新しい時へ！の巻, "Atarashī Toki he! no Maki"); 113. "Fly Up with your Wings" (翔（と）び立つ翼の巻, "Tobi Tatsu Tsubasa no Maki"); 114. "Solitary Departure" (ひとりきりの出発（たびだち）の巻, "Hitori Kiri no Shuppatsu no Maki")
