= List of Captain Tsubasa Road to 2002 chapters =

The manga Captain Tsubasa Road to 2002 is a sequel to Yōichi Takahashi's Captain Tsubasa series. The series follows Tsubasa Oozora, a soccer player who moves from São Paulo (Brancos in the anime) to Barcelona (Catalunya in the anime).

The manga was published by Shueisha in the seinen manga magazine Weekly Young Jump and collected in fifteen tankōbon volumes between June 2001 and August 19, 2004. Studio Comet adapted the series into an anime series simply titled Captain Tsubasa that aired on TV Tokyo between October 7, 2001, and October 6, 2002.

== Volume list ==
| No. | Japanese release date | Japanese ISBN |
|---|---|---|
| 1 | June 2001 | 4-08-876167-7 |
Road 1: "Road to 2002" (2002年への旅立ち!!, "2002 Nen he no Tabidachi!!"); Road 2: "The Choice of a New Team!!" (移籍先決定!!, "Iseki Saki Kettei!!"); Road 3: "The First Blow!" (最初の激突!!, "Saisho no Gekitotsu!!"); Road 4: "Liga's Baptism" (リーガの洗礼!!, "Rīga no Senrei!!"); Road 5: "First Step in Barca!!" (バルサでの第一歩!!, "Barusa de no Daīppo!!"); Road 6: "Body of Steel!!" (鋼鉄（はがね）の肉体（よろい）!!, "Kōtetsu no Nikutai!!"); Road 7: "Each One's Season In" (それぞれのシーズンイン!!, "Sorezore no Shīzun in!!"); Road 8: "1 on 1 Trial!!" (試練の1 on 1, "Shiren no 1 on 1")
| 2 | September 2001 | 4-08-876202-9 |
Road 9: Tenacity for Success (勝利への執念!!, Shōri he no Shūnen!!); Road 10: The Secret of Ballance (バランスの秘密, Baransu no Himitsu); Road 11: Violence!! Rivalry for a Position (熾烈!! ポジション争い, Shiretsu!! Pojishon Arasoi); Road 12: Submarine Iron Wall (鉄壁のサブマリン!!, Teppeki no Sabumarin!!); Road 13: Looking at 2002 (2002年を見据えて!!, 2002 Nen o Misue te!!); Road 14: Fierce Fight!! Bundesliga Opening Game (激闘!! ブンデスリーガ開幕戦, Gekitō!! Bundesurīga Kaimaku Sen); Road 15: Plunder Regular Position (レギュラーを奪い取れ!!, Regyurā o Ubaitore!!); Road 16: Misaki Taro's Decision (岬太郎の決断!!, Misaki Tarō no Ketsudan!!); Road 17: Only One for This Place (その場所は ただ一つ!!, Sono Basho ha Tada Hitotsu!!); Road 18: Mind Musn't Be Broken (くじけぬ心!!, Kujike nu Kokoro!!)
| 3 | December 2001 | 4-08-876244-4 |
Road 19: Beyond the Bridge of Hope (希望の橋の先に, Kibō no Hashi no Saki ni); Road 20: Serie A Debut (セリエAデビュー!!, Serie A Debyū!!); Road 21: Pry Open the Catenaccio!! (錠（カティナチオ）をこじあけろ!!, Jō (Katinachio) o Kojiakero!!); Road 22: Beast's Feast (猛獣どもの饗宴!!, Mōjū Domo no Kyōen!!); Road 23: The Best Pass, the Best Shoot (最高のパス、最高のシュート, Saikō no Pasu, Saikō no Shūto); Road 24: Fierce Tiger vs Black Panther (猛虎 vs 黒豹!!, Mōko vs Kuro Hyō!!); Road 25: Bet on This Right Leg (この右脚に賭けろ!!, Kono Migi Ashi ni Kakero!!); Road 26: The Ultimate Weapon Comes into Play!! (最終兵器 発動!!, Saishū Heiki Hatsudō!!); Road 27: DF Pride vs FW Pride (DF（ディフェンダー）のプライド vs FW（フォワード）のプライド!!, DF (Difendā) no Puraido vs FW (Fowādo) no Puraido!!); Road 28: The Fierce Tiger Won't Die (猛虎は死なず, Mōko ha Shina zu)
| 4 | March 24, 2002 | 4-08-876278-9 |
Road 29: From Japan to the World (日本から世界へ!!, Nippon Kara Sekai he!!); Road 30: Everyone's Desire (それぞれの思い!!, Sorezore no Omoi!!); Road 31: Beginning of the Miracle (奇跡の始まり, Kiseki no Hajimari); Road 32: Two Aces (二人の10番（エース）!!, Ni Nin no 10 Ban (Ēsu)!!); Road 33: Gang of the Ministadium Again (ミニスタジアムのギャング 再び, Mini Sutajiamu no Gyangu Futatabi); Road 34: Full Strength Soccer (全力のサッカーを!!, Zenryoku no Sakkā o!!); Road 35: End of the Shock!! (驚愕の結末!!, Kyōgaku no Ketsumatsu!!); Road 36: The Stage of the Reunion (再会の舞台, Saikai no Butai); Road 37: The Struggle Starts (死闘の幕開け!!, Shitō no Makuake!!); Road 38: Hamburg Takes The Lead!! (先制 ハンブルグ!!, Sensei Hanburugu!!)
| 5 | May 22, 2002 | 4-08-876294-0 |
Road 39: SGGK's Pride (SGGKの誇り!!, SGGK no Hokori!!); Road 40: Proof of Progress (進化の証明, Shinka no Shōmei); Road 41: Goal Offered to His Mom (母に捧げるゴール!!, Haha ni Sasageru Gōru!!); Road 42: As an Enemy, As a Friend (敵として友として, Teki Toshite Tomo Toshite); Road 43: Breathtaking Offence and Defence (息詰まる攻防!!, Ikidumaru Kōbō!!); Road 44: The Late Man (遅れてきた男!!, Okure Tekita Otoko!!); Road 45: The Trap of Circulating Passes!! (パス回しの罠!!, Pasu Mawashi no Wana!!); Road 46: Start Towards the Dream!! (夢へのスタート!!, Yume he no Sutāto!!); Road 47: Dragon's Roar (龍の咆哮, Ryū no Hōkō); Road 48: Raging Dogfight!! (荒ぶる空中戦!!, Susabu ru Kūchū Sen!!)
| 6 | August 24, 2002 | 4-08-876333-5 |
Road 49: Wounded Falcon (手負いの鷹, Teoi no Taka); Road 50: My Club (我がクラブよ…!!, Waga Kurabu yo...!!); Road 51: Separate Ways (別れゆく道, Wakare Yuku Michi); Road 52: 50-50 (50（フィフティ）-50（フィフティ）, 50 (Fifuti) - 50 (Fifuti)); Road 53: Beat the King!! (王者を倒せ!!, Ōja o Taose!!); Road 54: Victorious Shoot (勝利へのシュート, Shōri he no Shūto); Road 55: Light and Shade's Thin Difference (紙一重の明暗, Shi Ichi Jū no Meian); Road 56: Away's Baptism!? (アウェーの洗礼!?, Awē no Senrei!?); Road 57: Beginning of Survival (サバイバルの幕開け, Sabaibaru no Makuake); Road 58: Fierce Rivalries for the Selection!! (熾烈な代表枠争い!!, Shiretsu na Daihyō Waku Arasoi!!)
| 7 | November 24, 2002 | 4-08-876368-8 |
Road 59: Fierce Fight! J's Golden Age (激闘！Jの黄金世代, Gekitō! J no Ōgon Sedai); Road 60: 120% Determined (120%の決意!!, 120% no Ketsui!!); Road 61: Fearful New Weapon!! (戦慄の新兵器!!, Senritsu no Shin Heiki!!); Road 62: Indomitable Fighting Spirit (不屈の闘志!!, Fukutsu no Tōshi!!); Road 63: Distant First Step!! (遥かなる第一歩!!, Haruka Naru Daīppo!!); Road 64: The Coach's Real Intention (監督の真意, Kantoku no Shini); Road 65: Under the Italian Sky (イタリアの空の下!!, Itaria no Sora no Shimo!!); Road 66: Dream Within Reach (夢をこの手に!!, Yume o Kono te ni!!); Road 67: Hidden Hidden Plot (ウラのウラをかけ!!, Ura no Ura o Kake!!); Road 68: Instant of Delight (歓喜の瞬間（とき）, Kanki no Shunkan (Toki))
| 8 | February 24, 2003 | 4-08-876402-1 |
Road 69: Choice Called Transfer (移籍という選択肢, Iseki Toiu Sentakushi); Road 70: Hyuga's Answer (日向（ひゅうが）の答え, Hyūga no Kotae); Road 71: Move This Body To The Limits (この身体 動く限り, Kono Shintai Ugoku Kagiri); Road 72: To The Promised Place (約束の場所へ…!!, Yakusoku no Basho he...!!); Road 73: Departure To Tomorrow (明日への出発!!, Ashita he no Shuppatsu!!); Road 74: The Stage Of The Decisive Battle (決戦の舞台, Kessen no Butai); Road 75: Destined Rival (宿命のライバル!!, Shukumei no Raibaru!!); Road 76: New Determination (決意 新たに!!, Ketsui Arata ni!!); Road 77: Common Wish (思いは ひとつ!!, Omoi ha Hitotsu!!); Road 78: Objective Serie B!! (目指せ セリエB!!, Mezase Serie B!!)
| 9 | May 24, 2003 | 4-08-876443-9 |
Road 79: Invisible Enemy (見えない敵!!, Mie Nai Teki!!); Road 80: The Two Soccer Prodigies (二人のサッカー小僧, Ni Nin no Sakkā Kozō); Road 81: Tsubasa Can't Fly (飛べない翼, Tobe nai Tsubasa); Road 82: The Weight Of The Game Maker (トップ下の重み, Toppu ka no Omomi); Road 83: Taste of Victory (勝利の味, Shōri no Aji); Road 84: Strength of Support!! (応援を力に!!, Ōen o Chikara ni!!); Road 85: The Determination Kept in the Heart (胸に秘めた決意!!, Mune ni Hime ta Ketsui!!); Road 86: Spanish Derby (スペインダービー, Supein Dābī); Road 87: Fate's Kick Off (運命のキックオフ, Unmei no Kikkuofu); Road 88: First Move's Struggle!! (先手の取り合い!!, Sente no Toriai!!)
| 10 | August 24, 2003 | 4-08-876487-0 |
Road 89: Spirit of Pros (プロの魂, Puro no Tamashii); Road 90: Counterattack Begins!! (反撃開始!!, Hangeki Kaishi!!); Road 91: Only Confrontation (勝負あるのみ!!, Shōbu Aru Nomi!!); Road 92: Destroy the White Wall (白き壁を崩せ!!, Shiroki Kabe o Kuzuse!!); Road 93: Marvelous Newcomer (驚異の新人, Kyōi no Shinjin); Road 94: Blitz Counter (電撃のカウンター!!, Dengeki no Kauntā!!); Road 95: Natureza's Soccer, Tsubasa's Soccer (ナトゥレーザのサッカー、翼（つばさ）のサッカー, Natō Rēza no Sakkā, Tsubasa no Sakkā); Road 96: Natureza Lashes Out (ナトゥレーザ縦横無尽!!, Natōrēza Jūōmujin!!); Road 97: Fast Succession of Offense And Defense!! (矢継ぎ早の攻防!!, Yatsugibaya no Kōbō!!); Road 98: Fast Evolving Genius!! (加速する天才!!, Kasoku Suru Tensai!!)
| 11 | November 24, 2003 | 4-08-876525-7 |
Road 99: Counteroffensive Chance (反撃のチャンス, Hangeki no Chansu); Road 100: Barca's New Control Tower (バルサの新指令塔!!, Barusa no Shin Shirei tō!!); Road 101: Balls Destination (弾道の行方, Dandō no Yukue); Road 102: Get The Flow!! (この流れに乗れ!!, Kono Nagare ni Nore!!); Road 103: Field's Conductor (フィールドの指揮者（コンダクター）, Fīrudo no Shiki Sha (Kondakutā)); Road 104: Central Breakthrough!! (中央突破…!!, Chūō Toppa...!!); Road 105: La Liga First Goal (ラ・リーガ 初ゴール!!, Ra.Rīga Hatsu Gōru!!); Road 106: Camp Nou's Tempest (カンプ ノウの嵐, Kanpu nō no Arashi); Road 107: The Coach's Mind's Eye (監督の心眼, Kantoku no Shingan); Road 108: Mistery Power (神秘の力, Shinpi no Chikara)
| 12 | January 24, 2004 | 4-08-876565-6 |
Road 109: Keyword Is Zero (キーワードは“ゼロ”, Kīwādo ha "Zero"); Road 110: Crush the Keyman (キーマンを潰せ!!, Kīman o Tsubuse!!); Road 111: No.1 Club's Potential (No.1クラブの底力, No.1 Kurabu no Sokojikara); Road 112: Pierce the Wall (壁を射抜け!!, Kabe o Inuke!!); Road 113: Keep on Attacking (攻撃あるのみ!!, Kōgeki Aru Nomi!!); Road 114: Attack of Power and Technique (力と技の一撃, Ryoku to Waza no Ichigeki); Road 115: The Plan To Seal Barca!! (バルサ封じの秘策!!, Barusa Fūji no Hisaku!!); Road 116: Harsh Reality (屈辱の現実, Kutsujoku no Genjitsu); Road 117: Barca's New Lineup! (バルサの新布陣!!, Barusa no Shin Fujin!!); Road 118: Double Control Tower In Action (ダブル司令塔 発動!!, Daburu Shireitō Hatsudō!!)
| 13 | April 19, 2004 | 4-08-876596-6 |
Road 119: To the Limits of His Strength (力の限り…!!, Ryoku no Kagiri...!!); Road 120: Assault From The Sky!! (空からの強襲!!, Sora Kara no Kyōshū!!); Road 121: Birth of the New Golden Combi (新・黄金コンビ誕生!, Shin.Ōgon Konbi Tanjō!); Road 122: In Motion!! New Golden Combi (躍動!! 新黄金コンビ, Yakudō!! Shin Ōgon Konbi); Road 123: Free System (自由な形態（システム）!!, Jiyū na Keitai (Shisutemu)!!); Road 124: Attack!! (攻めてこそ…!!, Seme te Koso...!!); Road 125: Overcome The Pain!! (痛みに克て!!, Itami ni Kate!!); Road 126: Desire for Victory (勝利への想い, Shōri he no Omoi); Road 127: Natureza's Trap (ナトゥレーザの罠, Natōrēza no Wana); Road 128: Hot Night In Barcelona!! (バルセロナの熱い夜!!, Baruserona no Atsui Yoru!!)
| 14 | June 18, 2004 | 4-08-876617-2 |
Road 129: "Field's Aura" (フィールドの“気”, "Fīrudo no "Ki""); Road 130: "Son Of God's Strength" (神の子の力, "Shin no Kono Chikara"); Road 131: "Don't Give Up!!" (あきらめない!!, "Akirame nai!!"); Road 132: "1 On 1 Contest" (勝負の1on1, "Shōbu no 1 on 1"); Road 133: "Get Past Natureza!!" (ナトゥレーザを突破せよ!!, "Natōrēza o Toppa Seyo!!"); Road 134: "Spirited Attack" (魂の一撃, "Damashī no Ichigeki"); Road 135: "Entering Loss Time" (ロスタイム突入!!, "Rosutaimu Totsunyū!!"); Road 136: "Final Goal Is!!" (勝利への欲求, "Shōri he no Yokkyū"); Road 137: "Two Falcons!!" (二匹の鷹, "Ni Hiki no Taka"); Road 138: "'Til The Soul Is Exhausted!!" (魂 尽きるまで!!, "Damashī Tsukiru Made!!")
| 15 | August 19, 2004 | 4-08-876656-3 |
Road 139: "Strong Feelings" (強い気持ち, "Tsuyoi Kimochi"); Road 140: "Victorious Goal...!?" (決勝ゴール…!?, "Kesshō Gōru...!?"); Road 141: "Last Moment" (決着の瞬間（とき）, "Ketchaku no Shunkan (Toki)"); Road 142: "Time Up" (タイムアップ, "Taimu Appu"); Road 143: "Tears and Smiles" (涙と笑顔, "Namida to Egao"); Road 144: "Football Is..."; uno…… "In a Corner of Italy" (イタリアの片隅で, "Itaria no Katasumi de"); due…… "One Step Forward...!!" (一歩ずつ前へ…!!, "Ichi ho Zutsu Mae he...!!"); tre…… "Debut Match Kick Off!!" (デビュー戦キックオフ!!, "Debyū Sen Kikkuofu!!"); quattro…… "With Feelings!" (思いを乗せて!!, "Omoi o Nose te!!"); cinque…… "Mind Bond" (心の絆, "Shin no Kizuna")
