= List of Captain Tsubasa World Youth chapters =

The manga Captain Tsubasa World Youth is a direct sequel to Yōichi Takahashi Captain Tsubasa series. The series follows Aoi Shingo, a Japanese teenager who goes to Italy, hoping to play for a major Italian professional football soccer team. He does it so that he will improve his skills to join the young Japan's national football team and play alongside his idol Tsubasa Oozora to participate in the AFC Youth Championship.

The manga was published by Shueisha in the Weekly Shōnen Jump and collected in eighteen tankōbon volumes between December 1994 and November 1997. Studio Comet adapted the series into an anime series that also retells the events from Tsubasa's childhood under the title of Captain Tsubasa J.

== Volume list ==
No.	Japanese release date	Japanese ISBN
1	December 1994	4-08-871770-8
01. "Aoi Shingo's Appearance" (葵新伍登場!, "Aoi Shingo Tōjō!"); 02. "At The Door of Inter" (インテルへの扉!, "Interu he no Tobira!"); 03. "Time of Trial (試練の時!!", "Shiren no Toki!!"); 04. "Full Throttle Shingo" (全開新伍!, "Zenkai Shin Go!"); 05. "Prologue and Beginning" (序章－そして開幕へ!!, "Joshō - Soshite Kaimaku he!!"); 06. "Oozora Tsubasa, I'm Alright!" (大空翼元気です!, "Ōzora Tsubasa Genki Desu!")
2	March 1995	4-08-871854-2
07. "Child of God, Santana" (神の子サンターナ, "Shin no ko Santāna"); 08. "Santana Starts!" (サンターナ始動!, "Santāna Shidō!")
3	May 1995	4-08-871855-0
09. "From Bara to Santana" (サッカーサイボーグサンターナ, "Sakkā Sai Bōgu Santāna"); 10. "Aiming for Glory" (栄光をめざして, "Eikō o Mezashi te"); 11. "Hino Ryoma's Appearance!!" (火野竜馬登場!!, "Hino Ryōma Tōjō!!); 12. "The Young Noble Returns Alive, The Insurrection of the Young Lion" (貴公子の生還、若獅子の反乱, "Kikōshi no Seikan, Waka Shishi no Hanran"); 13. "The Pride of a Man" (誇り高き男, "Hokori Takaki Otoko"); 14. "RJ7's Entry" (R・J・7登場, "R.J.7 Tōjō")
4	July 1995	4-08-871856-9
15. "Furious Offense and Defense" (激しき攻防!!, "Hageshiki Kōbō!!"); 16. "Build the Best Team of the World!" (世界一のチームを作る!!, "Sekai Ichi no Chīmu o Tsukuru!!"); 17. "The Fierce Tiger's Departure" (猛虎の旅立ち!!, "Mōko no Tabidachi!!"); 18. "In Sao Paulo" (サンパウロにて, "San Pauro Nite"); 19. "Start Facing the Dream!!" (夢に向かってスタート!!, "Yume ni Mukatte Sutāto!!")
5	September 1995	4-08-871857-7
20. "Fight with Your Heart" (気迫で闘え!!, "Kihaku de Tatakae!!"); 21. "Overturn the Speculations" (下馬評をくつがえせ!!, "Gebahyō o Kutsugaese!!"); 22. "Tsubasa vs Bunnark" (翼VS.ブンナーク, "Tsubasa VS. Bunnāku"); 23. "Send It to Tsubasa!!" (翼につなげ!!, "Tsubasa ni Tsunage!!")
6	November 1995	4-08-871858-5
24. "SGGK" (S（スーパー）・G（グレート）・G（ゴール）・K（キーパー）!!, "S(Sūpā).G(Gurēto).G(Gōru).K(Kīpā)!!"); 25. "Clash Between Willpower and Willpower" (意地と意地の激突!!, "Iji to Iji no Gekitotsu!!"); 26. "The Laurels are Above You!" (栄冠はきみの上に!, "Eikan ha Kimi no Ue ni!")
7	January 1996	4-08-871859-3
27. "Get a New Special Shoot" (新・必殺シュートをつかめ!!, "Shin.Hissatsu Shūto o Tsukame!!"); 28. "The Completion of the New Special Shoot!!" (新・必殺シュートついに完成!, "Shin.Hissatsu Shūto Tsuini Kansei!"); 29. "Soldiers Who Grow Up" (成長した戦士たち, "Seichō Shi ta Senshi Tachi"); 30. "The Force of the Ship+Named Real Japan!!" (リアル・ジャパン丸の実力!!, "Riaru.Japan Maru no Jitsuryoku!!")
8	March 1996	4-08-871860-7
31. "Those Who We Can Rely On" (頼れるヤツら!, "Tayoreru Yatsu ra!"); 32. "The Genius Owairan" (天才オワイラン, "Tensai Owairan"); 33. "Sight Of The Raiju Shot" (雷獣シュート見参!!, "Raijū Shūto Kenzan!!"); Extra story "Principe Del Sole" (プリンチベ・デル・ソーレ, "Purinchibe.Deru.Sōre")
9	May 1996	4-08-872261-2
34. "Moment Of Victory" (勝利の瞬間!!, "Shōri no Shunkan!!"); 35. "Decisive Battle!" (決戦!, "Kessen!")
10	July 1996	4-08-872262-0
36. "China Youth's Counterattack!" (中国ユースの逆襲!, "Chūgoku Yūsu no Gyakushū!"); 37. "The Light Inside The Predicament!" (窮地の中の光!, "Kyūchi no Naka no Hikari!")
11	September 1996	4-08-872263-9
38. "Moment Of Victory And Miracle" (勝利と奇跡の瞬間!!, "Shōri to Kiseki no Shunkan!!"); 39. "The Man Who Comes Back" (帰ってきた男!, "Kaette ki ta Otoko!"); 40. "The Conclusion Of The Goal Keeper Wakashimazu!" (GK（ゴールキーパー）若島津の結論!, "GK (Gōrukīpā) Waka Shimatsu no Ketsuron!"); 41. "The Start Of The Newborn All Japan!!" (新生全日本始動!!, "Shinsei Zennihon Shidō!!"); 42. "The Door Towards The Dream!!" (夢への扉!!, "Yume he no Tobira!!"); 43. "Glory And" (栄光…そして!!, "Eikō... Soshite!!"); 44. "The New Barrier" (新たなる障壁!!, "Arata Naru Shōheki!!")
12	November 1996	4-08-872264-7
45. "The Field Of Dreams" (夢の舞台!!, "Yume no Butai!!"); 46. "The Soldier's Decision" (戦士たちの決意!, "Senshi Tachi no Ketsui!"); 47. "The Oath To Misaki" (岬への誓い!!, "Misaki he no Chikai!!"); 48. "The Reason Of The Tears" (涙の理由, "Namida no Riyū"); 49. "Reunion With Old Enemies" (宿敵との再会!, "Shukuteki to no Saikai!"); 50. "Prologue To The Fierce Fight!!" (激闘へのプロローグ!!, "Gekitō he no Purorōgu!!")
13	January 1997	4-08-872265-5
51. "On The Field" (フィールドの中に…!!, "Fīrudo no Naka ni...!!"); 52. "The Entrusted Ball" (託されたボール!!, "Takusa re ta Bōru!!")
14	March 1997	4-08-872266-3
53. "Because I Like It" (好きだから…!!, "Suki da Kara...!!"); 54. "Proof Of Progress" (成長の証!!, "Seichō no Akashi!!")
15	May 1997	4-08-872267-1
55. "Advancing To The Final Tournament" (決勝トーナメント進出!, "Kesshō Tōnamento Shinshutsu!"); 56. "Only One Wing" (片方だけの翼!, "Katahō Dake no Tsubasa!"); 57. "True Colors Of The Sweden Team!" (スウェーデンチームの正体!, "Suwēden Chīmu no Shōtai!")
16	July 1997	4-08-872268-X
58. "Successive Attacks Of The Mightnight Sun!" (白夜の波状攻撃!, "Byakuya no Hajō Kōgeki!"); 59. "The New Strategy" (恐怖の新戦術!, "Kyōfu no Shin Senjutsu!"); 60. "The Imaginary Shoot" (幻のシュート, "Maboroshi no Shūto")
17	September 1997	4-08-872269-8
61. "The Strong Brazil" (強者・ブラジル!, "Tsuwamono.Burajiru!"); 62. "Betting For The Place Of Best In The World!" (世界一の座をかけて!, "Sekai Ichi no Zaokakete!")
18	November 1997	4-08-872270-1
63. "V Goal" (Vゴール!!, "V Gōru!!"); 64. "Everyone's Future" (それぞれの未来, "Sorezore no Mirai")
