= List of Captain Tsubasa characters =

This is a list of characters who appear in anime, videogames and manga of Captain Tsubasa. Due to differences between anime, manga, and games of Captain Tsubasa, some characters appear only in one series.

== Characters ==
=== Tsubasa Ozora ===
Tsubasa Oozora, aka Oliver Atom, is one of the series' main protagonists. The character is known to inspired real life professional players such as Lionel Messi, Zinedine Zidane and Fernando Torres.

=== Genzo Wakabayashi ===
Genzo Wakabayashi (若林 源三, Wakabayashi Genzō) is the secondary protagonist, and the first rival to Tsubasa in the series and considered Japan's greatest goalkeeper. He first played as Shutetsu's goalkeeper and became a rival to Tsubasa, but after a match between Nankatsu and Shutetsu, they became good friends. An injury[knee injury]forbids him from playing most of the national championships along with his teammates at Nankatsu, but he returns, helping the team in defeating Meiwa. Wakabayashi later leaves for Germany to play for Hamburger SV where he meets Karl-Heinz Schneider and Hermann Kaltz, the former whom becomes a rival to him. He's later recruited by Mikami to play for the U-16 World Cup in France, but only plays in the finals against West Germany since Ken Wakashimazu was injured. He also joins the U-20 Japanese team in the World Youth arc, but injuries on both hands caused by Stefan Levin and Bryan Cruyfford prevent him from playing any matches. Fully recovered after the match with Italy, he gets his revenge on Levin and Cruyfford in the matches against Sweden and Holland and also plays in the finals against Brazil, only to get injured in the second half and to be replaced by Wakashimazu. After a Bundesliga match between Hamburger SV and Schneider's Bayern Munich, he's suspended from playing any further matches. He joins the U-22 and Olympic Japanese teams in the Golden-23 and Rising Sun arcs after recovering from an injury in his eye. After Japan beats Germany in the Olympic Games, Wakabayashi decides to join Schneider at Bayern Munich so that they can win the UEFA Champions League.

=== Kojiro Hyuga ===
Kojiro Hyuga (日向 小次郎, kana: ひゅうが こじろう) is the secondary protagonist, a forward and the ace striker for the Japanese national team. Coming from a poor family from Saitama, Hyuga lost his father at a young age so he had to take part-time jobs to help out his family. Although he can be quite hot-headed and arrogant, he's a very nice person, particularly towards his family and his teammates Takeshi Sawada and Ken Wakashimazu. After losing the elementary school tournament against Nankatsu, Hyuga, along with Sawada and Wakashimazu, joins Toho Academy, but fails to win the middle school tournament two times, only managing to get a win, sharing it with Nankatsu. He's recruited for the U-16 Japanese team and plays in all the matches, scoring the most goals. Later in high school, he wins three consecutive tournaments for Toho. He's taken off from the U-20 Japan team because he lacked post play. Aside from developing post play, he creates the Raiju Shoot, a shoot more powerful than his Tiger Shoot and develops a relationship with Maki Akamine, a softball player. He returns to the team and plays in the subsequent matches of the Asian preliminaries and the World Youth. He then signs a contract with Juventus FC but is taken off the team because of his poor balance and is loaned to Reggiana from Serie C.

=== Taro Misaki ===
Taro Misaki (岬 太郎, kana: みさき たろう) is the secondary protagonist, a midfielder for the Japanese national team, who forms the Golden Combo with Tsubasa. He's the son of a landscape painter who travels around the world. Because his father is always travelling, he's unable to make long-term friends. Before meeting Tsubasa and the rest of the Nankatsu players, he played with Meiwa and Furano. During the national championship, he and Tsubasa became close friends aside from forming the Golden Combi. After winning the national championship, he left with his father to France, not wanting to live with his mother, who had married another man and gave birth to a daughter. He reunites with Tsubasa in the International Junior Youth Tournament in France and also finds a rival in Pierre. He returns to Japan and plays for the Nankatsu team in high school for three years, only to lose three times for Toho Academy. In the World Youth arc, he's taken off from the team by Coach Gamo, but returns to the team after travelling around the world. Unfortunately before the World Youth, Misaki gets his left leg broken in a car accident while saving his half-sister. Despite his leg not being fully healed, he plays in the finals against Brazil, assisting in Tsubasa's hat-trick. He currently plays for Jubilo Iwata in the J-League and in the Golden-23 and Rising Sun arc, he plays for the U-22 and Olympic Japan teams.

=== Hikaru Matsuyama ===
Hikaru Matsuyama (松山光, kana: まつやま ひかる) is the secondary protagonist, either a defender or a midfielder for the Japanese national team. Whenever Tsubasa is not playing for Japan, he'll serve as captain. He first appeared in the national tournament as the captain of Furano and faced off against Meiwa in the semi-finals, but lost because his shot was stopped by Ken Wakashimazu. A few years later, he fought against Tsubasa's Nankatsu in the semi-finals, but failed once again. Matsuyama's then selected for the U-16 Japan team and serves as captain after a disastrous match against Hamburg SV, only to give the captain to Tsubasa. He continues to play for Furano in high school and begins to date Yoshiko Fujisawa (who had left for the United States because of her father's work). During the hard times of the Japan U-20 team, he contributes a lot to the team so that they do not fall apart. During the battle of World Youth arc, he was the first to find out about the RF7 challenge set by Gamo. He's absent for most of the quarter-finals match against Sweden because Yoshiko was involved in a car accident, but he returns to replace an injured Akai Tomeya and has a key in helping Japan win. In the Road to 2002 series, he plays for Consadole Sapporo and ties against Misugi, who now plays for FC Tokyo.

In Golden 23, Matsuyama was selected for the Japanese Olympics team as the captain. Coach Kira put a lot of trust in him, Misaki and Misugi, called the "3M" (3 Shooting Stars) of U-22 Japan, allowing them to handle the team's balance. He believed that Matsuyama's leadership would be important during the Asian preliminaries tournament.

=== Jun Misugi ===
Jun Misugi (三杉 淳, Misugi Jun, kana: みすぎ じゅん) is the secondary protagonist, a Japanese player who is first introduced as a prodigy from the Musashi high school soccer team. Despite being one of the most skilled Japanese players of his generation, Misugi is pushed back by a heart disease that makes him only work for few time per matches. It's said that if Misugi was not hampered by his heart disease, he would have been the best Japanese player, even better than Tsubasa. He overcomes his heart disease by not playing for three years during high school and becomes a valuable player for the Japanese team in the Asian preliminaries and in the World Youth. At first, he played for Bellmare Hiratsuka, but then joined FC Tokyo. In the J-League, he faces off against Consadole Sapporo, led by Matsuyama, but they tie and both acknowledge each other's skills. He's currently playing for Olympic Japan in the Madrid Olympics soccer tournament and is not yet engaged to his girlfriend Yayoi Aoba.

=== Shingo Aoi ===
Shingo Aoi (葵 新伍, Aoi Shingo, kana: あおい しんご) is a midfielder for the Japanese national team that forms the Golden Trio with Tsubasa and Misaki. He wanted to quit soccer after his team Nakahara FC lost against Nankatsu, but Tsubasa urged him not to. He joins Inter Juniors, but with the exception of goalkeeper Gino Hernandez and the kit manager Calimero, no one likes him and bully him so that he can leave. They finally accept him when he helps them win a match. Coach Minato Gamo of Japan U-20 calls him to help Japan in the first rounds of the Asian Tournament, claiming him to be his trump card. He remains a valuable member throughout the World Youth arc. He forms a rivalry with Salvatore Gentile, who is considered to be Italy's greatest líbero. He's disappointed when Italy's unable to defeat Uruguay because Hernandez and Gentile were injured by Ryoma Hino's Tornado Shoot. In the match against Italy, he plays full force that Hernandez and Gentile decide to play in the last minutes. In the final match against Brazil, he forms a trio with Tsubasa and Misaki. After Japan's win in the World Youth, he's bought by FC Albese from Serie C because he could not secure a place in Inter Milan. In the final match of Serie C, he faces off against Hyuga, who is playing for Reggiana, and although he fights with all he has, he loses. He's currently playing for Olympic Japan in the Rising Sun arc.

=== Ryo Ishizaki ===
Ryo Ishizaki (石崎 了, kana: いしざき りょう) is introduced as the captain of the until then very unsuccessful Nankatsu elementary school team. He is one of the moral pillars of the grade school team and the Japan team. For Japan, he usually wears the jerseys #14 or #4. His position is that of a defense and often tends to block a ball with his face.

Biography

At first, he is not as good at football as the other players, prone to errors. This clumsy personality was even reinforced in the 1983 anime, but in later series specially the 2018 anime we can see that Ishizaki can make up for every mistake with his guts - at his nickname clearly states - and has grown up to win his place as a regular in Japan Jr., a feat recognized by both Tsubasa and the Nankatsu gang at the end of the 16th national tournament. Despite not having a special shot or dribble skills, his extra efforts on-field are compared to those Matsuyama's in terms of teamwork and strategy sense gained due to pure training. In Nankatsu Public, Ishizaki progressed much and became the captain of the football team. During the Madrid Olympics tournament, Ishizaki's overlaps are even more decisive, his individual technique improved to the point he can dodge and outsmart opponents, he helped in scoring important goals, even an assist is credited to him.

Personality

Ishizaki is Tsubasa's first friend in Nankatsu and known for his gutsy, cheerful and straightforward personality. In words of Tsubasa himself, he was the reason why he did not leave Nankatsu for entering Toho Academy. Much like Misaki & Wakabayashi, he can lift up Tsubasa when the latter is down. He has also some comic-relief moments, specially in the anime. He tends to have quarrels with both Urabe and his girlfriend Yukari due to their explosive personalities.

He is currently playing for Jubilo Iwata and Olympic Japan in the Rising Sun arc. Voice: Danilo Diniz (in Brazil)

=== Ken Wakashimazu ===
Ken Wakashimazu (若島津 健, kana: わかしまづ けん) is one of the reserve goalkeepers and a forward for Japan. The son of a dojo owner, he uses his karate skills and speed as a goalkeeper. He helps Meiwa defeat Furano in the semi-finals of the national tournament, but loses to Nankatsu in the finals. Along with Takeshi Sawada, he joins Kojiro Hyuga to the Toho Academy where they lose two championships to Nankatsu, but manage to win the third, sharing the win with the other team. He's recruited to be part of the U-16 Japan team that will participate in the U-16 World Cup in France. During a match against Hamburg SV, he suffers an injury that only gets worse in the semi-finals against France. He later continues to play for Toho and is selected to be part of the U-20 team, but after refusing to be a reserve goalkeeper for Wakabayashi, he leaves the team to play for the Yokohama Fluegels in the J-League but later returns to the team, playing in the matches against Mexico, Uruguay and Italy. He currently plays for the Nagoya Grampus Eight and plays as a forward for the U-22 and Olympic Japan teams (something that Coach Kira always wanted, a two-top with Hyuga).

=== Takeshi Sawada ===
Takeshi Sawada (沢田 タケシ, kana: さわだ タケシ) is a midfielder and one of the youngest members for the Japanese national team. During the national championship, he serves as vice captain for Meiwa FC and later serves a more important role for Toho Academy when Hyuga was forbidden to play. Although he is two years younger than the majority of the others, he joins the U-16, U-20 and Olympic Japanese teams. He plays for Urawa Red Diamonds, along with Hayato Igawa, who is Japan's best libero. Takeshi had captained the U-19 side to win the U-19 Asian youth championship.

=== Shun Nitta ===
Shun Nitta (新田 瞬, kana: にった しゅん) is a forward for the Japanese national team known for his Hayabusa Shoot and one of the fastest characters in the series. Originally, he played for Nankatsu in elementary school, but in middle school, he played for Otomo along with Urabe, Kishida, Nakayama and Nishio, who also played for Nankatsu. They face off against Nankatsu in the finals of the regional tournament but lose 1 to 3. Nitta is then chosen for the U-16 Japanese team, playing against Italy, Argentina and West Germany. He returns to play for Nankatsu in high school and is later invited to play for U-20 Japan. He's taken off from the team because of his incapability to shoot with both legs after losing to Real Japan 7, but returns to the team. After the World Youth tournament, he plays for Kashiwa Reysol and is currently playing for Olympic Japan.

=== The Tachibana Twins ===
Masao Tachibana (立花 政夫, kana: たちばな まさお) and Kazuo Tachibana (立花 和夫, kana: たちばな かずお) are twins who play as forwards in their years at Hanawa, but later play as midfielders for the Japanese national team. They're known for their acrobatic skills, particularly the Skylab Hurricane. These acrobatic techniques proved to be an annoyance for Nankatsu in the elementary and middle school championships, but Tsubasa managed to beat the twins two times. They are later recruited for the Japan U-16 team but get injured after doing the Skylab Twin Shoot with Jito in the match with Argentina although they later play against France. Years later, when Japan loses to Real Japan 7, Coach Minato Gamo takes them off the team under the assumption that the twins cannot play without depending on one another. Much like with the other players that lost their position in the team, they regain them. They play for JEF Ichihara and sacrifice themselves in the final match against Australia in the Golden-23 arc., the Series in which they last appeared in Captain Tsubasa.

=== Makoto Soda ===
Makoto Soda (早田 誠, kana: そうだ まこと) is a defender for the Japanese national team known for his Kamisori Shot and his violent style of playing, that he injured Tsubasa in the match between his team Azumaichi and Nankatsu. He's chosen to represent Japan in the World Cup in Paris, playing in the matches against Italy and Argentina, but gets expelled in the match against France. He suffers another expulsion when he's taken off from Japan U-20 by Minato Gamo because he only has the Kamisori Shot. He returns to the team though, having developed the Kamisori Pass. He plays for Gamba Osaka and is now representing Olympic Japan.

=== Hiroshi Jito ===
Hiroshi Jito (次藤 洋, kana: じとう ひろし) is a player who plays as a defender for the Japanese national team due to his large size and build. He originally fought hand-to-hand combat but grew bored of it and was convinced by Mitsuru Sano to play soccer because of Tsubasa. Although he loses to Tsubasa, he's chosen to play for Japan in the Paris World Junior Cup, playing in all of the matches. Minato Gamo later expels him from the team because he's too slow to be a soccer player. In the matches against China and Saudi Arabia, he marks Fei Xiang and Vulcan, the tallest players of the respective teams. His club team is Avispa Fukuoka and he currently is a member of Olympic Japan.

=== Mitsuru Sano ===
Mitsuru Sano (佐野 滿, kana: さの みつる) is a midfielder for Japan and one of the smallest players in the team alongside Nitta and the Tachibana twins. During his years at Hirado, he formed the Hirado Combi with Jito, and while this combi proved to be excellent, Nankatsu beat Hirado in the quarter-finals of the national middle school tournament. He has played for the U-16, U-20 and U-22 Japanese teams and is currently playing for Olympic Japan in the Madrid Olympics while he plays for Avispa Fukuoka in the J-League alongside Jito.

=== Kazuki Sorimachi ===
Kazuki Sorimachi (反町 一樹, kana: そりまち かずき) is a forward for the Japanese national team that plays for Vissel Kobe in the J-League. At Toho Academy, he formed a two-top combination with Hyuga, but when the latter is unable to play in any matches of the middle school tournament, Sorimachi served as the ace striker for the team. He's a substitute member for the U-16, U-20, U-22 and the Olympic Japan teams.

=== Mamoru Izawa ===
Mamoru Izawa (井沢 守, kana: いざわ まもる) is a midfielder for the Japanese national team, Nankatsu, Shutetsu and for Yokohama F. Marinos in the J-League. At Shutetsu and at Nankatsu, he forms a trio with Teppei Kisugi and Hajime Taki, where they passed the ball to one another at fast paces. Although he's primarily a midfielder, he has proven several times to be a good defender.

=== Teppei Kisugi (Tetsuhei Kurusei) ===
Teppei Kisugi (来生 哲兵, kana: きすぎ てっぺい) is a substitute member for the Japanese national team and plays as a forward. He forms the Shutetsu Trio with Izawa and Taki and forms the Silver Combi with Taki. Although he's a member for the Japan team, he rarely gets the chance to play, only playing in the matches of the first round of the Asian preliminaries and in the match against Denmark in the Golden-23 arc. He plays for Cerezo Osaka in the J-League.

=== Hajime Taki ===
Hajime Taki (滝 一, kana: たき はじめ) is a forward for the Japanese national team. Along with Izawa and Kisugi, he forms the Shutetsu Trio and the Silver Combi with Kisugi, his childhood friend. He only plays for Japan in the matches of the first round of the Asian preliminaries in the World Youth arc and in the match against Denmark in the Golden-23 arc.

=== Shingo Takasugi ===
Shingo Takasugi (高杉 真吾, kana: たかすぎ しんご) is a defender for the Japanese national team known for his tall build. He played for Nankatsu in his middle and high school years, but as a senior, he plays for Sanfrecce Hiroshima. He has a good vision since he's the only one that realizes that Tsubasa gets injured in the match against Azumaichi.

=== Yuzo Morisaki ===
Yuzo Morisaki (森崎 有三, kana: もりさき ゆうぞう) is the third goalkeeper for the Japanese national team. When his idol Wakabayashi gets injured, he serves as the starting goalkeeper for Nankatsu SC and becomes the regular goalkeeper for the team after Wakabayashi leaves for West Germany. Although he's not on the level of Wakabayashi and Wakashimazu, he has proven himself to be a good goalkeeper, injuring himself to stop Thailand from scoring a potential fifth goal.

=== Roberto Hongo ===
Roberto Hongo (ロベルト 本郷) is an Adult Brazil football player friend of Tsubasa's father. His career ended because of an accident who compromised his sight. His confidence shattered he started to drink heavily, but when he saw Tsubasa playing football, he was very surprised and found him. Roberto became Tsubasa's football mentor, teaching Tsubasa how to do new tricks. Back in Brazil he became the coach of the Brazil national team at the World Youth, and then was promoted as assistant in the senior Team.

=== Noboru Sawaki ===
Noboru Saw is a forward of Meiwa FC and Meiwa Higashi middle school. Initially he was born as an attacking midfielder but, thanks to the arrival of Sawada, he will become a forward. In elementary schools Sawaki will give Hyuga many assists, becoming decisive for the climb of the Meiwa during the tournament. He, along with Hyuga, will score many goals. The team reached the finals against Nankatsu while remaining unbeaten. In this match Sawaki had a good chance to equalize near the end of the game when he was in front of the goal unmarked. However, this was prevented by Ishizaki. In the end, Meiwa lost 2–4. In middle school, Sawaki then moved on to Meiwa Higashi middle school, unlike his former teammates Hyuga, Wakashimazu and later Sawada, who go to the Toho Academy. After beating Kanamura 2–0, in the semifinals he will challenge his old teammates Hyuga, Sawada and Wakashimazu. He was confident about a victory, since they knew Toho the best, and especially since Toho's strength was weakened because Hyuga will not be playing. He scored one goal against Wakashimazu with the Sliding Tackle Force to take the lead, however Toho managed to reverse the score in the last minutes and won 2–1. After the 16th National middle school tournament, Sawaki was selected as the best 24 players of the tournament and was invited to the training camp of All Japan Jr. Youth during three weeks, but he does not make it for the strengthening matches in West Germany with the definite squad for Japan.

== Foreign players ==
=== Gino Hernandez (Italy) ===
Gino Hernandez is the captain and goalkeeper for the Italy national team. His team faces off against Japan in the first match of the World Cup in Paris, where he shows his incredible goalkeeper skills. However, Japan managed to score two goals at him, defeating Italy. Having suffered an injury from Hyuga's Tiger Shot, he's unable to play against Argentina, which eliminates Italy from the tournament. He meets Shingo Aoi and they become close friends. In the World Youth arc, he's injured along with líbero Salvatore Gentile by Ryoma Hino's Tornado Shot in the match against Uruguay. Despite his injuries, he plays in the final group match against Japan in the last minutes of the second half but loses by 4–0. He currently plays for Inter Milan.

=== Juan Díaz (Argentina) ===
Juan Díaz is the captain and a midfielder for the Argentina national team. He's best friends with Alan Pascal, who he has known since childhood and form a combo together. His team easily beats Italy in the World Cup in France due to their goalkeeper Gino Hernandez being injured, but loses to Japan in the next round. He later takes part in the Argentina team in the World Youth, beating Ghana and South Korea in the group stages, but loses to Netherlands in the final group stage and to Germany in the quarter-finals. It's later revealed that he was not in the best condition in the World Youth due to injuries that he got in the Argentinian league. After recovering from his injuries, he wins the Copa Libertadores for Boca Juniors and will join SSC Napoli. In the Rising Sun arc, he's the captain for the Olympic Argentina team. His team defeats Nigeria and Netherlands, but loses to Japan, but still manages to qualify for the quarter-finals.

=== Elle Sid Pierre (France) ===
Elle Sid Pierre (エル・シド・ピエール) is the captain and a midfielder for the France national team, known for his elegant playstyle. A child of a rich family, Pierre never felt comfortable about his sheltered lifestyle, and decided to take up football following his belief that everyone is on equal standing in the pitch. His country serves as the host for the U-16 World Cup. Along with forward Louis Napoleon, he forms the Eiffel Offensive. France beats England and Malaysia, but lose to Japan in the semi-finals in an intense match that ends with Japan winning a penalty kick shootout. He returns in the World Youth arc as the captain of the U-20 team, beating Cameroon and Saudi Arabia, but losing to Brazil and Netherlands. Recently, he's the captain for the Olympic France team.

=== Louis Napoleon (France) ===
Louis Napoleon is the ace striker and a forward for the France national team that is quite violent and hot-headed. Despite his behavior, he's an excellent striker that forms the Eiffel Offensive along with Elle Sid Pierre, the captain of the French team. In the matches against England and Malaysia, he scores hat-tricks. In the semi-finals against Japan, he fails to score during the penalty kick shootout. He also played for the French team in the World Youth and is currently playing for Olympic France.

=== Ramón Victorino (Uruguay) ===
Ramón Victorino (ラモン・ビクトリーノ) is the forward and captain for the Uruguayan national team, known as the Black Panther of South America because of his ability to run 100 meters in 11 seconds, making him one of the fastest characters in the series. His team defeats Belgium and Spain in the group stages of the world tournament in France, but loses to West Germany in the semi-finals because of Deuter Muller. He's the only player from the U-16 Uruguay team to stay in the U-20 team, where he forms a combo with Ryoma Hino. In the group stages of the World Youth, Uruguay beats Italy and Mexico, but loses to Japan in the second round. They are disqualified from the tournament after losing to Brazil in the quarter-finals. He joins SV Werder Bremen and plays in the Bundesliga opening match against Hamburg SV, but fails to score a goal.

=== Karl-Heinz Schneider (Germany) ===
The captain and ace striker for the Germany national team and one of Genzo Wakabayashi's greatest rivals, being able to score a goal at him outside the penalty area. He's the captain of the West Germany team in the Paris World Cup, defeating Canada, Portugal and Uruguay, scoring a hat-trick in all three matches. He faces off against Wakabayashi in the finals against Japan, but despite scoring two goals, Japan wins the tournament. His parents, who were separate, reconcile with one another. Originally from Hamburg SV, he joins Bayern Munich. In the World Youth arc, Germany (who had been reunified) beats Cameroon and the United States in Group B, but loses to Sweden in the final group stage by 3–5. In that match, Sweden captain Stefan Levin injures Schneider and goalkeeper Deuter Muller with his deadly Levin Shoot. Nevertheless, Germany manages to pass the group stages and defeats Argentina in the quarter-finals, but loses to Brazil in the semi-finals. In the Road to 2002 arc, he gets another showdown against Wakabayashi where he wins by scoring a goal while Hamburg SV's goal area was unprotected. He currently plays for the Olympic Germany team.

=== Carlos Santana (Brazil) ===
Carlos Santana (カルロス • サンタナ) is a forward for the Brazil national team. As a baby, he was abandoned by his mother in a basket and was adopted by an old couple that were later killed in a car accident. With no relatives, Barsole Bara, the owner of Bara FC, decided to adopt him and train him 24 hours. There, Santana met Leo, who became best friends with him. He reclaims his freedom from Bara and joins CR Flamengo along with Leo, but retains Bara's soccer, an emotionless type of soccer. In a match that will determine who will be champion of the Brazilian National Championship, Santana faces off against Tsubasa. Despite his skills, he loses to Tsubasa, but he regains his old soccer back, a soccer where he trusts everyone else and realizes that he's not alone anymore. He, Leo and Tsubasa's partner Pepe join the Brazil national team coached by Roberto Hongo, who refuses to give him the number 10 shirt because he has already found his number 10. In the World Youth, Brazil easily beats Cameroon, Saudi Arabia, France, Argentina and Germany, with Santana scoring hat-tricks in every match, but loses to Japan in the finals. Nevertheless, Santana is reunited with his biological mother and wins the title of best scorer in the tournament. He currently plays for Valencia CF and for the Olympic Brazil team where he forms a trio with Natureza and Rivaul. His first appearance was in the videogame Captain Tsubasa Vol. II: Super Striker

=== Natureza (Brazil) ===
Natureza is a former Amazonian villager from Brazil who was found by Roberto Hongo. Convinced by the former player to join Brazil Youth national team to display his gifted football skills in civilization, Natureza became the team's secret weapon. However, he does not appear in the manga until the final when Japan Youth is about to defeat Brazil. Roberto puts him on the field, wearing no. 10, allowing him to score and tie the game. In the last minutes, Tsubasa Oozora manages to score again and win for Japan, giving Natureza the desire to beat his new found rival in Spain. In Road to 2002, Natureza has become a member of Real Madrid, wearing no. 0. In Rising Sun, Natureza joins the Brazilian U23 national football team, along with Rivaul and Santana in a quest to win the first Olympic Gold in men's football for Brazil. Natureza is considered to be an adaption of the Tecmo character Coimbra, who gets the same role in Captain Tsubasa 2.

=== Rivaul (Brazil) ===
Rivaul is a Brazilian player, known as the best player at FC Barcelona. He is introduced in Road to 2002 guiding the rookie Tsubasa. During a match, Rivaul is injured, allowing Tsubasa to take his place for the El Clásico against Real Madrid. As Madrid enjoys the upper hand in the match, Rivaul joins the match as a substitute to assist Tsubasa and the team to win the match.

In the Rising Sun series, Rivaul is named as captain and one of the 3 over-age players in the Brazilian U23 national football team for the Olympics tournament. Both Naturezza and Santana are also members of the team as Brazil tries to win the nation's first Olympics gold in men's football. In the series he is introduced as a Ballon d'Or winner, FIFA World Cup winner, FIFA World Youth Cup winner as well as a Copa America winner but his only missing honour is the Olympics Gold medal.

=== Singprasert Bunnaak (Thailand) ===
Bunnaak is the captain and a defender for the Thailand national team. Originally a Muay Thai fighter, he became a soccer player because the stadium is larger than the ring. Although Thailand proves to be a powerful team due to the combined effort of Bunnark and the Konsawatt Brothers, Japan beats them by 5–4. He later joins Atlético de Madrid and serves as captain for the U-22 Thailand team, but fails to get past the third round of the Asian preliminaries for the Madrid Olympics.

=== Mark Owairan (Saudi Arabia) ===
Owairan is the captain and a defender for the Saudi Arabia national team. He descends from the royal family, but he feels uncomfortable with his life, resorting to play soccer. His team is considered to have the best defense in Asia due to the Antlion Larva Pit Defense tactic. In the Asian 2nd round preliminaries, Saudi Arabia defeats Uzbekistan, United Arab Emirates and China, but loses to Japan and South Korea. Saudi Arabia still manages to get a spot in the World Youth, but loses to Brazil and France and manages a tie with Cameroon.

=== Xiao Junguang (China) ===
Xiao Junguang is a midfielder for the Chinese national team and their secret weapon. While he manages to score a goal at Wakabayashi outside the penalty area, China still loses to Japan in a match of the Asian preliminaries. Because of his injury, he's unable to play in the match against Saudi Arabia, who eliminates China from the preliminaries. He then signs a contract with FC Bayern Munich where he plays alongside Schneider and Levin.

=== Ricardo Espadas (Mexico) ===
Ricardo Espadas is the goalkeeper and captain of the Mexico national team. As a kid, he lived in the slums of Mexico City along with García, Saragosa, Alvez, Suárez and López. Since they had no ball, they had to play with a ball made of clothes. After overcoming his poverty, he became captain of the Mexican team. The first team they face in the World Youth is Japan and while they prove to be a fierce opponent, they lose to Japan by 1–2. They are eliminated from the tournament since they had a draw against Italy and two losses against Japan and Uruguay. Espadas currently plays for Everton and in the Rising Sun, played for Olympic Mexico, who was eliminated from the tournament by Olympic Spain.

=== Stefan Levin (Sweden) ===
Stefan Levin is the captain and a midfielder for the Swedish national team. One year before the events of the World Youth tournament, his fiancée Katarina Karen died in a car crash. This made him become a cold and heartless person and fulfill his wish of becoming the best soccer player in the world. He signs for 1FC Koln and in a match against Hamburger SV in the Bundesliga, he injures Genzo Wakabayashi with his deadly Levin Shot. In the World Youth, Sweden tied against Colombia and the United States to avoid playing against Brazil in the knockout matches. Levin finally plays in the match against Germany and injures Karl Heinz Schneider and Deuter Muller with his Levin Shoot, winning against Germany by 5–3. In the quarter-finals against Japan, Levin finds himself unable to shake free from Akai Tomeya, who is replacing Hikaru Matsuyama because the latter's girlfriend was injured in a car accident. Akai blocks many of Levin's powerful shoots but this causes him grave injuries. Levin eventually realizes the error of his ways once Tsubasa tells him that he would never use the ball to hurt his opponents and that Karen would not have liked the kind of soccer he plays now. While Sweden plays with all its might, Japan beats Sweden by 1 goal during extra time. Despite losing, Levin decides to keep on playing soccer and signs a contract with Bayern Munich.

=== Brian Kluivoort (Netherlands) ===
Brian Kluivoort is the captain and midfielder for the Dutch national team. He had an older brother who died in a tragic car accident named Stijn . He's picked for the Netherlands national team by scoutman Denis Kramer, who later passes away. Cruyfford injures Genzo Wakabayashi in a match with Germany and wins by 3–1. Netherlands then easily beats Japan in two friendly matches. After Japan beats Netherlands by 10–1 with the help of Tsubasa Ozora, Cruyfford swears to make them pay in the World Youth. Netherlands defeats Argentina, South Korea and Ghana in the group stages of Group C and beats France in the quarter-finals. In the semi-finals against Japan, Cruyfford meets Wakabayashi once again but this time fails to score a goal, losing to Japan by 1 goal during extra-time. In the Rising Sun arc, he was the captain for Olympic Netherlands, but lost to Olympic Japan and Olympic Argentina and was disqualified. He'll play for Manchester United after winning Eredvisie two times with Ajax.

=== Michael Juanito (Spain) ===
Michael is a midfielder who plays for the Spain national team. As a young boy, he was raised at the Montserrat Church and there was taught soccer by Juanito, the bishop from the church. The bishop died ten years later, but before he died, he told Michael he could do whatever he likes. After seeing two matches between Barcelona and Real Madrid (the teams in which Tsubasa and Natureza play), he decides to sign a contract with CF Numancia. With him, Numancia defeats Real Madrid and Valencia. He's currently playing for Olympic Spain in the Madrid Olympics. He is considered a genius as he was the second player hold Naturezza, who is supposedly a prodigy, after Tsubasa.and he is the best player in captain Tsubasa series

== Tecmo Characters ==
The characters listed here are non-canon to the manga. The Tecmo game series is takes place in an alternate reality to the manga.

=== Babington ===
Babington is Tsubasa's teammate from Captain Tsubasa 2 to Captain Tsubasa 3, and is the sole Argentinian player of Sao Paulo FC. In Captain Tsubasa 4, he does not play for Sao Paulo, but is still seen playing for Argentina. However, he does not appear in Captain Tsubasa 5.

=== Doutor ===
Doutor (mistranslated as Dottil in the English rom of Captain Tsubasa Vol.II: Super Striker), is a Brazilian player who plays for Sao Paulo from Captain Tsubasa 2 to 3. In Captain Tsubasa 4 he leaves Sao Paulo alongside Amaral another Brazilian player he combines with. Like Babington, he is not seen in the fifth game.

=== Macher ===
Macher is a player who appears in the first game and its sequel. He's not seen again till the Mega CD game.

=== Stratto ===
Stratto is the secondary protagonist of Captain Tsubasa 4, he is introduced as Tsubasa's rival and teammate, later on in the game, they become friends. He develops a super shot called the "Megaton Shot" in the early point of the game. In Captain Tsubasa 5 he's given a subdued role, but still has some importance in the story, he's seen in the first match of the 1994 Serie A of the main story, and is seen in the second part of Hyuga's chapter. After testing Hyuga, he cited that if he could use 100% of his strength, then he could become the strongest ace striker in the world.

== Other notable characters ==
Luciano Leo (Brazil)
Pepe (Brazil)
Salinas (Brazil)
Hermann Kaltz (Germany)
Manfred Margus (Germany)
Deuter Muller (Germany)
Salvatore Gentile (Italy)
Faran Konsawatt (Thailand)
Sakhon Konsawatt (Thailand)
Chana Konsawatt (Thailand)
Ryoma Hino (Uruguay)
Taichi Nakanishi (Japan)
