= 3 Colors Infinity =

Studio album by Kids Alive
- Released: January 23, 2002
- Genre: J-pop, Rock
- Length: 45:28
- Label: Avex
- Producer: Kids Alive

3 Colors Infinity is the only full-length studio album of Japanese pop/rock band Kids Alive. The album was released on January 23, 2002, and contains all of their previous singles.

== Track listing ==
No.	Title	Length
1.	"Bokura no Bouken (ボクらの冒険, Adventure of us)"	3:56
2.	"Ame (雨, Rain)"	4:09
3.	"Ready Go!"	4:00
4.	"Funwari (ふんわり, Fluffy)"	3:29
5.	"Go! Go! Tātoru! (Go! Go! タートル!, Go! Go! Turtle!)"	3:06
6.	"Song For Lover"	5:38
7.	"Top Speed"	3:46
8.	"Hoshi ni Natta Kimi e... (星になったキミへ…, To grow into a star...)"	4:58
9.	"Summer Vacation ~Bokura wa Unmei Kyoudoutai ＼(*^-^*)／~ (サマーバケーション〜ボクらは運命共同体＼(*^-^*)／~, Summer Vacation: We are a Community by fate ＼(*^-^*)／~)"	3:46
10.	"Supesharu roketto (スペシャルロケット, Special Rocket)"	3:51
11.	"Arigatou (ありがとう, Thank you)"	4:53
Total length:		45:28
