= Tsubasa Oozora =

Fictional character from Captain Tsubasa

- Captain Tsubasa character
- Tsubasa as seen in the Road to 2002 anime series as a child (left) and as an adult (right)
- First appearance: Manga chapter: "Soar Toward The Great Sky!" (1981)
- Created by: Yōichi Takahashi
- Voiced by (Japanese): 1983 series, J, Shin: Akari Hibino (child); Nozomu Sasaki (adult); Road to 2002: Kikuko Inoue (child); Tomokazu Seki (adult); 2018 series: Yūko Sanpei
- Voiced by (English): 1983 series: Candice Moore; Kathryn Ryan (on Animax); 2018 series: Paula Barros (season 1); Erica Mendez (season 2)

In-universe information
- Affiliation: Nankatsu Elementary School; Nankatsu SC
- Relatives: Koudai Oozora (father); Natsuko Oozora (mother); Daichi Oozora (brother); Sanae Nakazawa (wife)
- Nationality: Japanese

Tsubasa Oozora (Japanese: 大空 翼, Hepburn: Ōzora Tsubasa), also known as Oliver Atom in multiple dubs, is a fictional character and the main protagonist of the manga series Captain Tsubasa written by Yōichi Takahashi. Tsubasa is a prodigious association football player who dreams of winning the FIFA World Cup for Japan one day. The series follows Tsubasa's growth from primary school life in Japan, to other teams in other countries as well as Japan's national team. Tsubasa's usual position is midfielder but he sometimes plays as a forward, normally wearing jersey #10. He has also appeared in the series' anime adaptations and video games based on the manga series.

Takahashi conceptualized Tsubasa as a strong player who would appear in multiple manga as he grew up. To make the character's career stand out, Takahashi decided Tsubasa would never lose a match (though has lost once), stating that readers like strong characters. While there were no major influences in the making of the character, Takahashi linked Tsubasa with other real-life players including Kazuyoshi Miura. Multiple voice actors have played the character in animated adaptations of the series.

Tsubasa has become an iconic character in Japan and worldwide because of the impact he had on real-life events. Three statues of him have been placed in Katsushika, Japan, while readers from the manga and anime series have given him support in popularity polls. His image has been used by real players, some of whom have imitated the character's playing techniques. Critical reception has acknowledged how popular and appealing the character became because of his personality, playing talent and inspirational dreams.

== Creation and development ==
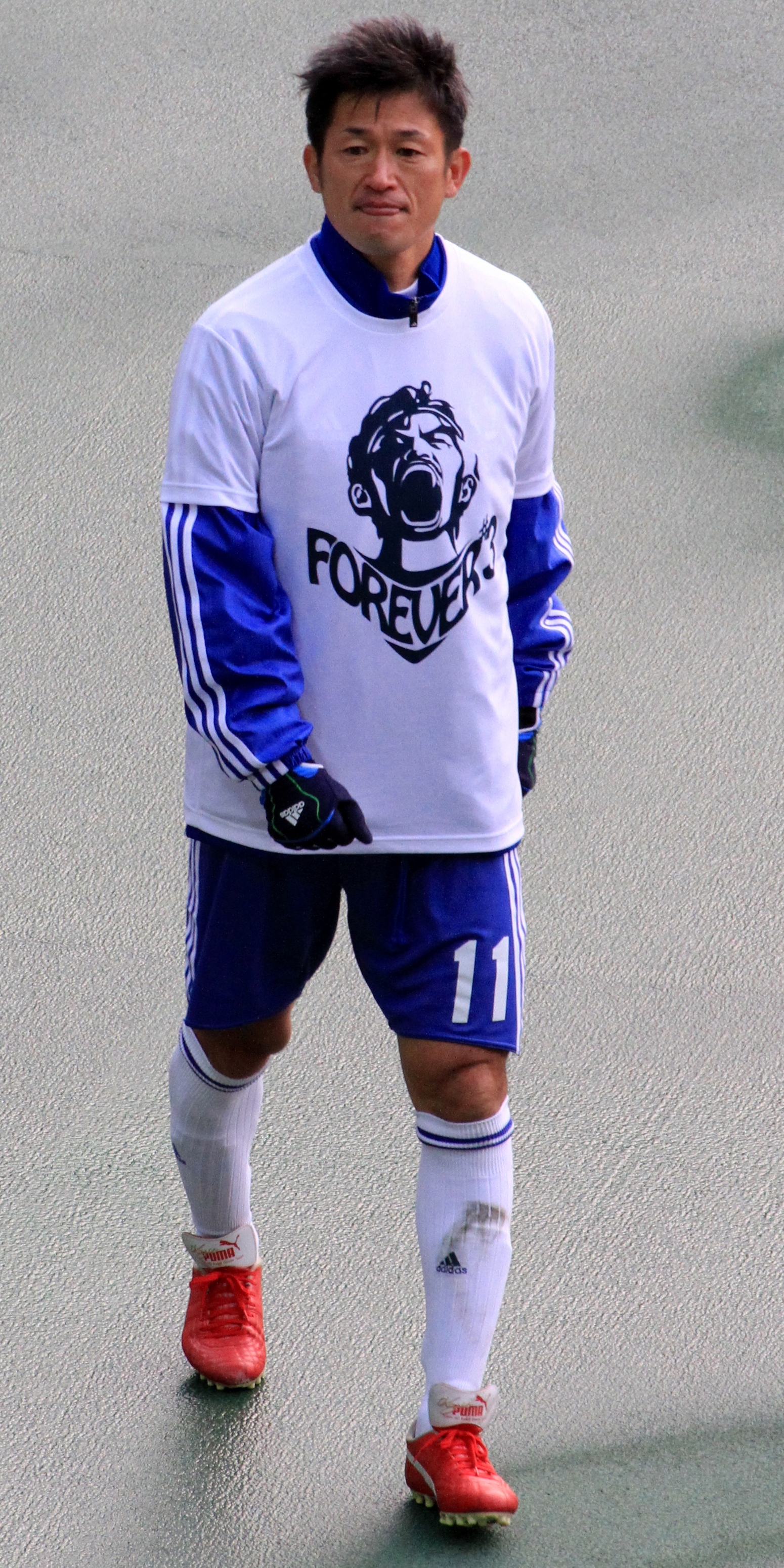
Yōichi Takahashi was influenced by Kazuyoshi Miura for the creation of the character.

Manga author Yōichi Takahashi created Tsubasa Oozora as a part of a growth story intended to show the readers and viewers how characters are developed through the plot. He gave Tsubasa multiple rivals with differing traits to make his matches more challenging. Jun Misugi was at first a superior player to Tsubasa but Takahashi made Misugi suffer from heart problems to bring more conflict into the match between the two players. Fans had pointed out that Tsubasa's teams always tend to win or tie but never lose; Takahashi stated that to make the story longer, he had to make the protagonist's team participate in more matches and that readers want strong characters, which resulted in Tsubasa being a prodigy. Tsubasa's first team, the Nankatsu, was based on a team Takahashi took part in as child that aimed to become a first-category team despite being low-skilled at the time. In retrospect, Takahashi said Tsubasa was a less realistic character than other protagonists he had created; most notably the character Kyosuke Kano from the Hungry Heart: Wild Striker series was written to be more realistic and had to face family issues and relearn the rules of the sport. When he began writing the original series, Takahashi told readers Tsubasa was a football player whom the players could relate if they cared about the sport.

Takahashi said rumors claiming Tsubasa was based on Musashi Mizushima due to similarities between their lives were untrue; however, Mizushima's move to São Paulo as a ten-year-old boy was partly used in the manga. Takahashi said he had been influenced by Kazuyoshi Miura because he was the first Japanese player to play outside Japan. In World Youth, a new character named Shingo Aoi who trained in Italy joins Japan's team; he is an idol of Tsubasa. The relationship between the characters has been likened to that between Hidetoshi Nakata and Miura, though Tsubasa and Shingo are friendlier. In 2011, Takahashi had plans to finish Tsubasa's first year in Barcelona but also wanted to tell a story about the Japanese Olympic football team, from which Tsubasa was absent because the character Misaki Taro was taking the lead. Takahashi stated that he had no plans to end his story in 2012 because Tsubasa's dream is winning the FIFA World Cup.

Because Takahashi likes European football, he decided Tsubasa would leave São Paulo and join Spain's Barcelona at the age of 21. In 1998, Takahashi traveled to Barcelona and enjoyed its Camp Nou ground; he was inspired to make the Barcelona team Tsubasa's future team; he said Tsubasa would have joined Real Madrid if he had visited its pitch. Because of Tsubasa's inexperience, real-life player Rivaldo becomes his mentor during the manga Road to 2002. In 2016, Takahashi compared Tsubasa with Lionel Messi—another Barcelona player. Takahashi highly enjoyed drawing Tsubasa's life in the Barcelona team. Since the manga started, Takahashi has been inspired by the Barcelona team. Takahashi also linked Tsubasa to Andrés Iniesta, who inspired him during a fictional match between the Real Madrid and Barcelona from the manga Road to 2002. The rivalry between Tsubasa and another character Kojiro Hyuga was also linked with the rivalry between Messi and Real Madrid player Cristiano Ronaldo due to their powerful clashes. When Japan women's national football team won its first FIFA Women's World Cup title in Germany, Takahashi drew comparisons between Tsubasa and Homare Sawa, the women's team's captain.

Several voice actors have portrayed Tsubasa; Akari Hibino, the character's first voice actor, played him in the first anime series and the original video animation sequel Shin Captain Tsubasa. As an adult in the anime Captain Tsubasa J, he is voiced by Nozomu Sasaki. In the anime Road to 2002, he was voiced by Kikuko Inoue as a teenager and by Tomokazu Seki as an adult. For the 2018 anime, Yūko Sanpei took the role of Tsubasa's Japanese voice; she commented, "I thought he was cheerful and a naturally talented soccer player at first, but now I know he actually practices diligently".

== Appearances ==
=== Main manga ===
==== Captain Tsubasa ====
Tsubasa first appeared as the main protagonist of the manga Captain Tsubasa, which Takahashi started writing in 1981. At the beginning of the series, Tsubasa is a lonely, soccer-obsessed, unembittered, elementary school pupil who has recently moved to the city of Nankatsu with his mother. Tsubasa 's life was saved by his football in a road-traffic accident when he was barely able to walk; Tsubasa held the football in front of him, which cushioned most of the impact. Immediately upon his arrival, Tsubasa challenges Shutetsu's genius goalkeeper Genzo Wakabayashi to a duel. The duel is observed by Roberto Hongo, a former member of the Brazil national football team and a friend of Tsubasa's father, who becomes his mentor. Joining Nankatsu school's soccer team, Tsubasa meets Taro Misaki with whom he forms a pairing that is later called "The Golden Duo" (ゴールデンコンビ, Gōruden Konbi), and chief supporter Sanae Nakazawa who soon develops a crush on him.

When Tsubasa is chosen as a member of the city's team for the national championship, he and his friends face opposition from Kojirou Hyuga, who becomes one of his biggest rivals. Tsubasa's team wins the tournament but Roberto breaks the promise of going to Brazil to train with Tsubasa, believing he is still too young. Nevertheless, he leaves Tsubasa a notebook with instructions to guide him. Tsubasa becomes a midfielder for Nakatsu and creates a shot known as Drive Shoot (ドライブシュート, Doraibu shūto) that can change the ball's reach. In the following years of training, Tsubasa perfects the Drive Shoot but is severely wounded in his left arm an left leg, causing Tsubasa to end his final game against Hyuga's Toho team with a tie. Following his recovery, many of his friends and rivals are selected by his coach as part of a team that wins the FIFA U-16 World Championship for Japan. He leaves Japan to follow his dream of becoming a professional soccer player in Brazil but periodically returns to play for the national team. Before leaving, Tsubasa tells Sanae he fell in love with her.

==== World Youth ====
In the manga World Youth, Tsubasa has become São Paulo's captain and encounters a new rival named Carlos Santana who plays for CR Flamengo. Following their match, Tsubasa returns to Japan to help the young Japanese team pass the World Youth's Asian preliminaries. Japan enters the tournament, which the country hosts because of a war. Tsubasa once again leads the Japanese team into the tournament and encounters old enemies including Carlos Santana in the finals and Natureza—a teenager trained by Roberto. After Japan's victory, Tsubasa proposes to Sanae and they get married. In the aftermath, the Barcelona FC invites him to join them.

==== Road to 2002 ====
In the manga series Road to 2002, Tsubasa says farewell to Roberto during his final match in São Paulo. Tsubasa and Sanae move to Spain, where Tsubasa intends to join the Barcelona team. There, he meets Rivaul, a highly skilled player who has surpassed Tsubasa. Because Tsubasa is not able to fit into the team, he is instead sent to the low-class division team FC Barcelona B. He scores 12 goals and 11 assists, and is sent back to the main Barcelona team. When Rivaul being wounded in a match, Tsubasa replaces him for a game between Barcelona and Real Madrid, during which Tsubasa faces Natureza once again but is unable to lead the team into victory until a wounded Rivaul rejoins the team.

==== Golden-23—onwards ====
In the following series, Golden-23, Tsubasa debuts in the adult Japan team during a match against Germany. He continues playing for Barcelona because the Japanese coach decides not to seek help from international players in the Olympic Games' elimination stages. Tsubasa once again faces Carlos Santana, who is playing in the Valencia team while Misaki is leading Japan in the eliminatories. Tsubasa learns that Sanae is pregnant. Tsubasa, Hyuga and Aoi Shingo return for a match in Hiroshima. The one-shot La Liga depicts another match between the Barcelona team and other Spanish teams. At the beginning of Rising Sun, Tsubasa has become his team's most valuable player because he has made multiple hat tricks and has helped Barcelona become the champion of La Liga. Following this, Tsubasa joins Japan's team to participate in the Olympic Games. After a few matches, he collapses and is forced to leave the team until he recovers.

=== Tecmo's game series continuity ===
Tsubasa has appeared in multiple video games based on the manga. The first game, titled Captain Tsubasa, altered Tsubasa's design and called him Robin Field. However, the video games starting from Super Striker follow an alternate life of Tsubasa. In Super Striker, Tsubasa is already playing for São Paulo Youth. He aims to defeat Carlos Santana and win the Rio Cup while also joining his fellow Japanese players for a cup. In Kotei no Chosen, Tsubasa aims for a second consecutive win in the Brazilian Rio Cup. Japan challenges the "World Youth". By Captain Tsubasa IV: Pro no Rival-tachi, Tsubasa still remains in São Paulo and can become a member of the Brazilian league selection. The final Tecmo game, Hasha no Shogo, has Tsubasa goes to Italy to play for the U.S. Lecce as a transfer from Brazil while later joining the Japanese team.

=== Other media ===
In the film Captain Tsubasa: The Great European Showdown (1985), Tsubasa is selected as one of the Japanese members of an International Jr. Youth Tournament in which Japan faces multiple Western rivals. The film was followed by the sequel Captain Tsubasa: Danger! All Japan Jr. (1985), in which Japan faces an All Europe Jr. team despite lacking Hyuga and Wakabayashi. The third film, Captain Tsubasa: Run Towards Tomorrow (1986), follows Tsubasa as he leads a team from the All Japan Jr. Youth against another team while remembering how he met them. The fourth and most recent film, Captain Tsubasa: World Great Battle - Jr. World Cup (1986), involves a new tournament between multiple youth teams in which Tsubasa's All Japan Jr. faces South America Jr., a team trained by Roberto Hongo.

His first manga one-shot appearance was in Captain Tsubasa: World Youth Tokubetsu Hen - Saikyo no Teki! Holanda Youth, in which Tsubasa returns from Brazil to Japan to play a match against Holland's Youth Team. The one-shot was adapted into an original video animation (OVA), in which Tsubasa can only assist Japan during the game's second half due to his late arrival. In the one-shot Captain Tsubasa 2000: Millennium Dream, he appears as a playable video game character competing with Brazil's team for a gold medal. In the two-part story Captain Tsubasa: Golden Dream, Barcelona faces Japan's Júbilo Iwata, resulting in the first time Tsubasa faces Misaki. In the five-part story Captain Tsubasa 25th Anniversary, Japan's team plays against a team composed of famous international players. In the one-shot Captain Tsubasa: Golden-23 - Japan Dream 2006, Tsubasa is a part of a Japanese team that plays against a team from Germany.

In 2008, Takahashi wrote the one-shot Captain Tsubasa: Endless Dream that is set after the franchise's first story arc; Tsubasa is depressed because Roberto has left him. His friends and rivals cheer him up by telling him he still has comrades thanks to football. In the one-shot Captain Tsubasa Tokubetsu Hen: Live Together 2010, a test match between Japan and Argentina takes place. A trilogy of light novels written by Hitomi Wada based on Captain Tsubasa retell the events of Tsubasa's childhood depicted in the series' first story arc. Another one-shot, Captain Tsubasa Boyhood Arc, focuses on Tsubasa's teenage years. Outside the franchise, Tsubasa has been mentioned in Hungry Heart: Wild Striker, another manga by Takahashi.

== Reception ==
=== Popularity ===
A statue of Tsubasa in Katsushika, Tokyo

Tsubasa has been popular with Japanese readers of the series. In 1985, he topped the series' popularity poll with 11,740 votes. His rank fell in 2005 to fifth position with 1,123 votes. In a Newtype poll, Tsubasa was voted the 21st-most-popular male anime character from the 1980s. During the 2006 World Cup. Tsubasa was depicted on the new bottle design for Kirin Nuda, the official drink of Japan's soccer team. Tsubasa and Misaki appeared in a video promoting the Tokyo 2020 Olympics that was presented at the closing ceremony of the 2016 Summer Olympics.

Several statues of Tsubasa have appeared in Katsushika, Tokyo; the first one was placed in a park in March 2013. By March 2014, two statues of Hyuga and Misaki were added; Takahashi said, "The captain [Tsubasa] must be happy to have his teammates around". The panel showing Tsubasa and Misaki simultaneously kicking a football— known as the "Twin Shot"—was depicted in a bronze statue that was created in 2018 and sited in Katsushika. In 2014, another statue of the Twin Shot was sponsored by Adidas and sited in displayed in Hysan Place to commemorate that year's World Cup in Brazil. In a match from Japan for the 2018 FIFA World Cup, the Japanese fans held a tifo featuring an illustration from the manga with multiple message that supported the team.

Barcelona FC expressed delight at Tsubasa's joining of its fictional counterpart because of the impact the character had. The translator of the manga's Arabic edition, Kassoumah Mhd Obada, said he wanted its readers to be inspired by Tsubasa's hard work to live a healthy life despite their country's problems.

=== Critical response ===
Tsubasa is one of the most popular manga and anime characters in Japan's history. According to the book American Soccer: History, Culture, Class, Tsubasa was an inspiration throughout the world due to his portrayal in the story. The book Sport, Literature, Society: Cultural Historical Studies calls him one of "Japan's greatest soccer heroes" because of his characterization and skills but because the series was not published in North America, few people from the United States are familiar with him, which led to Tsubasa being called a "tried-and-true, full-fledged fictional cartoon". According to Huffington Post, because Captain Tsubasa spawned multiple manga series, Tsubasa and Wakabayashi have been regarded as icons for multiple generations.

In The Imperial Sportive: Sporting Lives in the Service of Modern Japan, Sandra Collins stated the series was successful because of the lead character's intense discipline within social groups and his rivalries. Hobby Consolas enjoyed Tsubasa's struggle against the strongest players from Thailand during a PlayStation game. THEM Anime Reviews wrote that Tsubasa obtained an international reputation despite being better known in Western countries as "Oliver Atom". Tsubasa's debut in the 2018 anime was praised by Zona Freak because of the way he engaged Wakabayashi in a challenge involving kicking a ball under a truck. Mouse agreed the scene in which Tsubasa bonds with his football after he almost dies in a road accident is faithful to the first anime. While noting similarities between the lives of Tsubasa and Kazuyoshi Miura, the book The Blizzard - The Football Quarterly: Issue Twenty Seven noted a major contrast between them; while Tsubasa is usually cheerful and proves himself as a skilled player despite his move to Brazil, Miura's life was far more challenging in his early years and his life in Brazil. In a review of the New Captain Tsubasa OVAs, THEM Anime Reviews noted that while the voice actor Akari Hibino is using a high-pitched voice for Tsubasa, the voice sounded strange and comparing it with Goku, the main character of the anime Dragon Ball because both characters are played by women regardless of their growth.

According to David Martinez of Hobby Consolas, after Tsubasa's Barcelona debut, Tsubasa and his friends return to Japan to play for their country but their situation within the European clubs is more entertaining. A writer for Nippon said Tsubasa had become one of the most likable fictional characters because of his dream and career, which influenced others. Espinof wrote that one of series' most notable features is that Tsubasa's skills allow him to score goals and that his training with his teammates also appealed to readers. His passion for football and his relationship with Wakabayashi were also praised. The audience also found the character's search to become a champion appealing.

Several of Tsubasa's soccer techniques have been imitated by real-life players such as Julian Draxler and Abel Hernández. James Rodríguez said he related to the character when watching the television series, which he enjoyed because of Tsubasa's playing techniques and relationship with his father. On his Instagram account, André-Pierre Gignac also expressed a liking for Tsubasa, comparing him with himself. Japan's Hidetoshi Nakata, Italy's Alessandro Del Piero and Chile's Alexis Sánchez have also been influenced by Tsubasa. Spanish player Fernando Torres stated that he aspired to become a professional footballer because he had enjoyed seeing Tsubasa on television and wished to be like him. Tsubasa and Misaki's "ridiculous" yet appealing Twin Shot move inspired some children to try to emulate it according to EifSoccer.
