= Kōichi Hashimoto =

Japanese voice actor

- 橋本 晃一
- Born: Yōichi Mitsuhashi; January 12, 1953 (age 73); Chiba Prefecture, Japan
- Education: Senshu University
- Occupations: Actor; voice actor; narrator
- Agent: Centenaria

Kōichi Hashimoto (橋本 晃一, Hashimoto Kōichi; born Yōichi Mitsuhashi (三橋 洋一, Mitsuhashi Yōichi), January 12, 1953) is a Japanese actor, voice actor, and narrator from Chiba Prefecture, Japan. He is currently affiliated with Centenaria, though he has been attached to Arts Vision, Aksent, Ken Production, Art 7, and Umikaze in the past.

== Filmography ==
=== Television animation ===
1977

- Ore wa Teppei
- Ippatsu Kanta-kun (Hisashi Gohigō)

1983

- Captain Tsubasa (Genzō Wakabayashi)
- Aura Battler Dunbine (Fei Chenka)

1984

- Katri, Girl of the Meadows (Biriyami)

1985

- Blue Comet SPT Layzner (Bohn, Derol)

1986

- The Wonderful Wizard of Oz
- Ginga: Nagareboshi Gin (Wilson)
- Saint Seiya (Cygnus Hyōga)
- High School! Kimengumi (Kyūma Taku)
- Machine Robo: Revenge of Cronos (Rod Drill)

1987

- City Hunter (Announcer)
- Mister Ajikko (Akihiko)

1988

- Tatakae!! Ramenman (Cheng)
- Hello! Lady Lynn (Gym)

1989

- Kimba the White Lion (Zoo Announcer)

1993

- Aoki Densetsu Shoot! (Naoshige Serizawa)

1994

- Mobile Fighter G Gundam (Wong Yunfat)
- Sailor Moon S (Kakusui Yakushiji)

1996

- Rurouni Kenshin (Kanekura)

1998

- Silent Möbius (Robert De Vice)
- Detective Conan (Junko's father (Yoshiaki Hara))

2000

- One Piece (Captain Kuro, Sai)

2004

- Beet the Vandel Buster (Barasa)

Unknown date

- Future GPX Cyber Formula (Announcer)
- The Super Dimension Century Orguss (Slay)
- Tales of Eternia (Tasuteku Burukāno)
- Magical Taruruto-kun (Ashita Banryū)

=== OVA ===
- Captain Tsubasa: Holland Youth (xxxx) (Genzō Wakabayashi)
- Legend of the Galactic Heroes (xxxx) (Gunter Kesselring)
- Saint Seiya (xxxx) (Cygnus Hyōga)
- Megazone 23 (xxxx) (Nakao)
- Mobile Suit Gundam 0083: Stardust Memory (1991) (Bicok)

=== Theatrical animation ===
- Captain Tsubasa series (xxxx) (Genzō Wakabayashi)
- Silent Möbius 2 (1992) (Robert De Vice)
- Saint Seiya series (xxxx) (Cygnus Hyōga)
- Space Runaway Ideon ((xxxx) Marusu Bento)
- Doraemon: Nobita's Monstrous Underwater Castle (1983) (Ocean Dweller)
- The Plot of the Fuma Clan (xxxx) (Fuma B)
- Doraemon: Nobita and the Birth of Japan (1989) (Future Time Patroller)

== Video games ==
- Captain Tsubasa 5: Hasha no Shogo Campione (xxxx) (Alcion, Genzo Wakabayashi)
- Saint Seiya: Sanctuary Jūnikyū Hen (2005) (Cygnus Hyōga)

== Drama CDs ==
- Koei CD Drama Collections Sangokushi Daiichibu (xxxx) (Tomosaki Nagano)

== Radio dramas ==
- Star Wars (xxxx) (C-3PO)
