= Captain Tsubasa 4: Pro no Rival Tachi =

1993 video game

- Cover art showing Carlos Santana (top left), Taro Misaki (top right), Stratto (bottom right) and Tsubasa Ohzora (bottom left).
- Developer: Tecmo
- Publisher: Tecmo
- Composer: Hiroshi Miyazaki
- Series: Captain Tsubasa
- Platform: Super Famicom
- Release: JP: April 3, 1993
- Genre: Traditional soccer simulation
- Modes: Single-player, multiplayer

Captain Tsubasa 4: Professional Rivals (キャプテン翼IV プロのライバルたち, Kyaputen Tusbasa Fō: Puro ni Rivaru Tachi) is the third sequel and fourth installment in the Captain Tsubasa video game series by Tecmo. It's a direct sequel of Captain Tsubasa 3: Koutei no Chousen and was released exclusively in Japan for Nintendo's Super Famicom on April 3, 1993, with inferior graphics compared to its predecessor.

== Reception ==
In Japan, the game topped the Famitsu sales chart in April 1993.
