= Kids Alive =

Japanese rock band

- Origin: Ashibetsu, Hokkaidō, Japan
- Genres: Rock; J-pop
- Years active: 1998–2003
- Labels: Avex; Kids Records
- Past members: Akihiro; Yuta; Keiji
- Website: Official Avex site

Kids Alive was a Japanese rock band formed in 1998 when bassist Akihiro Yamamura, vocalist Yuta Aihara and guitarist Hiroshi "Keiji" Kanno signed up for Kids Records. Their first major debut single was released in 2002. They changed over to the Cutting Edge label for their next five singles and album two years later. They were with avex and released their two latest singles with them shortly before their break-up in 2003.

One of their songs, "Bokura no bouken", was used as the first ending theme of the anime Hikaru no Go and its opening melody was sampled by German rapper Kool Savas for his Song "Tot oder Lebendig". "2nd Stage" was used for the opening theme of the anime Hungry Heart: Wild Striker.

== Members ==
- Akihiro (real name: Akihiro Yamamura) - Bass (山村 明弘)
- Yuta (real name: Yūta Aihara) - Vocal (相原 憂太)
- Keiji (real name: Hiroshi Kanno) - Guitar (菅野 浩司)

== Singles ==
- (2000.11.25) 「NEW DREAM」
- (2001.02.28) 「雨」
- (2001.05.23) 「Top Speed」
- (2001.08.08) 「サマーバケーション～ボクらは運命共同体\(*^-^*)/～」
- (2001.11.14) 「ボクらの冒険」
- (2002.05.09) 「Never mind」
- (2002.11.07) 「2nd STAGE」
- (2003.02.05) 「ふたりの季節～North Point～」

== Album ==
- (2002.01.23) 「3 Colors Infinity」
