= Ōzora (surname) =

Ōzora, Ozora, Oozora or Ohzora (written: 大空) is a Japanese surname. Notable people with the surname include:

- Naomi Ōzora (大空 直美; born 1989), Japanese voice actress
- Oozora Subaru (大空スバル), Japanese VTuber

== Fictional characters ==
- Akari Ōzora (大空 あかり), a character in the anime series Aikatsu!
- Ako Ōzora (大空 アコ), a character in the anime series Kaidan Restaurant
- Haruka Ōzora (大空 遥), a character in the manga series Harukana Receive
- Haruka Ōzora (大空 遥), a character in the game and anime series Little Battlers Experience W
- Hibari Ōzora (大空 ひばり), titular character of the manga series Stop!! Hibari-kun!
- Hiro Ōzora (大空 ヒロ), a character in the game and anime series Little Battlers Experience W
- Tsubasa Oozora (大空 翼), protagonist of the manga series Captain Tsubasa
- Yujin Ozora (大空 勇仁), a character in the anime series Digimon Universe: Appli Monsters
