= Hungry Heart (manga) =

Japanese anime and manga series

- First tankōbon volume cover

ハングリーハート WILD STRIKER (Hangurī Hāto Wairudo Sutoraikā)
- Genre: Sports
- Manga
- Written by: Yōichi Takahashi
- Published by: Akita Shoten
- Magazine: Weekly Shōnen Champion
- Original run: January 24, 2002 – February 10, 2005
- Volumes: 6
- Anime television series
- Directed by: Satoshi Saga
- Produced by: Katsunori Namuro; Shunichi Kosao
- Written by: Yoshiyuki Suga
- Music by: Nobuyuki Nakamura
- Studio: Nippon Animation
- Original network: Animax, Fuji TV
- English network: SEA: Animax Asia
- Original run: September 11, 2002 – September 10, 2003
- Episodes: 52
- icon

Hungry Heart (Japanese: ハングリーハート WILD STRIKER, Hepburn: Hangurī Hāto Wairudo Sutoraikā) is a Japanese football manga and anime series, authored by Yōichi Takahashi. The manga was serialized in Akita Shoten's shōnen manga magazine Weekly Shōnen Champion from January 2002 to February 2005, with its chapters collected in six tankōbon volumes. An anime adaptation titled in English as simply Hungry Heart was produced by Nippon Animation and broadcast on Animax from September 2002 to September 2003, spanning a total of 52 episodes.

== Storyline ==
Hungry Heart: Wild Striker tells the story of Kanō Kyōsuke, a teenage high school student who at the beginning of the series, has just transferred into Jyoyō Orange High School. Kyōsuke's older brother is the illustrious and extremely famous A.C. Milan football player, Kanō Seisuke, who had first taught him how to play and love the game of football and whom he has greatly admired since childhood. After Seisuke left Japan to sign with Italian powerhouse A.C. Milan, people started comparing Kyōsuke with his brother and criticizing him due to his different playing style. Living in his brother's shadow, Kyōsuke's love for the game slowly started to evaporate and lessen, and he eventually lost most of his passion for it.

After his transfer to Jyoyō and a fated meeting with Tsujiwaki Miki, an enthusiastic girl with a lot of passion for football and who soon reinvigorates his love for the game with her determination to excel, Kyōsuke's deep love and passion for football returns to its fullest. He soon joins the Jyoyō men's football team and makes several friends, such as his fellow freshmen, Sakai Jefferson, a talented goalkeeper, and Rodrigo, a passionate Brazilian transfer student. Kyōsuke, with the support of his friends at Jyoyō and invigorated with Miki's care and help and by his love and determination to excel in football, takes on the best, and discovers an immense and determined passion for the game.

== Characters ==
Kyōsuke Kanō (叶 恭介, Kanō Kyōsuke)
Voiced by: Kohsuke Toriumi
Called Orangehead jokingly by some of his friends, Kyōsuke is a forward. He learned the ins and outs of football from his illustrious elder brother, A.C. Milan playmaker Kanō Seisuke. After Seisuke's departure, he slowly loses interest in the game, but rediscovers his love for it after a fated meeting with Miki. Initially the coach of Jyoyō's women's football team, the determination exhibited by the girls, especially Miki, invigorates his passion for football, and soon he joins Jyoyō's men's football team, emerging as their ace striker. In the last episode, he becomes a player for AFC Ajax.
Miki Tsujiwaki (辻脇 美紀, Tsujiwaki Miki)
Voiced by: Natsuki Katō
Kyōsuke's closest friend, and the captain of the Jyoyō female football team. Despite their frequent fights, the two eventually fall in love with each other.
Rafael Rodrigo del Franco (ロドリゴ, Rodorigo)
Voiced by: Katashi Ishizuka
Rodrigo is a midfielder and transfer student from Brazil who wants to go pro in order to help his large family. While he appears to be cold, self-centered and only driven by money at first, his attitude radically changes after his meeting with Kyosuke. Rodrigo is Jyoyo's playmaker, who earns the interest of several professional J. League clubs. In the final year, he becomes the captain of Akanegaoka.
Kōji Jefferson Sakai (境ジェファーソン公司, Sakai Jefāson Kōji)
Voiced by: Masaya Takatsuka
Sakai is the team's goalkeeper and a half-Japanese transfer student from Sweden, known for being attractive to women. Jyoyō's star goalkeeper learns to overcome his repressed fear of injury through his interactions with his new teammates. Sakai shares a strong bond with both Rodrigo and Kyosuke.
Gohzo Kamata (釜田 豪三, Kamata Gōzo)
Voiced by: Kenji Nomura
Kamata is plays foulback. He played forward in junior high but becomes Jyoyo's defensive leader and vice captain. Kyosuke often joking jabs at him, but respects Kamata deeply. Kamata also has a family who runs a ramen business and was visited by Kyosuke to convince his father to support him. Kamata is currently playing for a regional team and aiming for a spot in the J-League.
Yoshiya Sako (佐古 俊也, Sako Toshiya)
Voiced by: Yoshikazu Nagano
Sako is the team's midfielder. Jyoyo's team captain and playmaker prior to Rodrigo's takeover. Sako is levelheaded, mentally quick and always willing to help his teammates. He has a rivalry with Ryosei's captain and genius playmaker Furuki during high school. He and Furuki end up being teammates in university.
Hiroshi Ichikawa (一河 ヒロシ, Ichikawa Hiroshi)
Voiced by: Hiroyuki Yoshino
Ichikawa is a midfielder known for his hot-headed attitude. In the first year, he has trouble with Rodrigo's individualist attitude, as he believes teamwork is the key for victory. In the second year, he is chosen to be vice captain and has to deal with Yūya and his group.
Masashi Esaka (江坂 マサシ, Esaka Masashi)
Voiced by: Yoshirō Matsumoto
Esaka is a midfielder referred to as "Osaka" by Kyosuke. Esaka seems to take everything in stride and with a smile on his face. While appearing to be no more than comic relief, he is actually quite passionate about his teammates' well-being and the team's performance. He is selected to be Jyoyo's new captain by both Sako and Kamata, who both acknowledged his excellent attitude and drive to improve.
Yūya Kiba (木場 優也, Kiba Yūya)
Voiced by: Kenichi Suzumura
Kiba is a forward who only appears in the anime. Called "Nesthead" by Kyōsuke. Kyōsuke's rival during his second year for the forward position. He also falls in love with Miki and battles with Kyōsuke in order to win her heart. He is known for his speed and striking ability.
Masahiko Shinkawa (新川 マサヒコ, Shinkawa Masahiko)
Voiced by: Jun Fukuyama
Shinkawa is a midfielder who only appears in the anime. He is the fastest member of the team and Yūya's close friend. He and Muroi joined football to help Yūya make it into the J-League as a way to thank him for getting them out of their lives as delinquents. He is known for his incredible speed and dribbling ability.
Kazuya Muroi (室井 和也, Muroi Kazuya)
Voiced by: Eiji Takemoto
Muroi plays defense and only appears in the anime. He replaces Kamata in Kyosuke's second year as a defender and is known for his Mohawk hairstyle. Like Shinkawa, he started playing football to help Yūya make it into the J-League.
Kazuo Murakami (村上 監督, Murakami Kazuo)
Voiced by: Takashi Matsuyama
The coach of the Jyōyo men's football team. He was formerly a powerful forward for the Japanese National Team.
Kazuto Mori (森 一人, Mori Kazuto)
Voiced by: Akari Hibino
Manager of the Jyōyo men's football team. He used to play football in middle school, but due to an injury cannot play anymore.
Fukuko Ōmori (大森 福子, Ōmori Fukuko)
Voiced by: Yoshiko Iseki
Jyōyo dormitory's cook.
Kaori Dōmoto (堂本 香織, Dōmoto Kaori)
Voiced by: Kae Araki
Jyōyo's nutritionist and team doctor. She is Seisuke's girlfriend, who asked her to watch over his brother in his absence.
Seisuke Kanō (叶 成介, Kanō Seisuke)
Voiced by: Takehito Koyasu
Kyōsuke's older brother. When he was younger, he led both his middle and high school's football teams to the nationals and won, and was in the top three in high school. A world-renowned player before 17, he also had a J. League contract before age 21, and later became the A.C. Milan star and captain. He also had excellent academic grades.
Akira Furuki
Voiced by: Kōji Yusa
Ryosei's team captain. He plays ID (Important Data) football and later plays on the same college team as Sako.
Makoto Iguchi
Kokuryō's ace goalkeeper. He also plays with the Japan youth team.
Yūjirō Kamiyama
Voiced by: Kōki Harasawa
Kokuryō's ace striker. Kyōsuke's rival as the best striker in the region and a member of the Japan youth team.
Minori Fujimori (藤森 稔, Fujimori Minoru) and Kaoru Fujimori (藤森 薫, Fujimori Kaoru)
Voiced by: Kōji Yusa
The Fujimori brothers are known as Kokuryō's dynamic duo and are the team's midfielders. They are members of the Japan youth team.
Yuki Kagami (加賀美 勇樹, Kagami Yūki)

- Voiced by: Kenichi Suzumura

He is Tenryū's captain and the team's midfielder. He becomes Kyōsuke's rival as the best player in high school football in Japan.
Masashi Nakayama (中山 雅史, Nakayama Masashi)
Voiced by: Himself
Like Jyōyo's coach Murakami, he was a former player for the national team. He was the first man to ever score a goal in a World Cup for Japan (in the 1998 World Cup, in Japan's final group stage game, a 1-2 loss to Jamaica), since this was their first time to play in the tournament.
Keisuke Narumi
Biological father of Kyosuke, who held a mark in Japanese football. Lost his life in a car accident shortly before being called to the Japan national football team. Kyosuke was in the car, but managed to survive the accident. He holds a record of scoring in the prefecture before Kyosuke broke it.
Mitsuko Narumi
Biological mother of Kyosuke. She lost her life in the car accident along with her husband.
Coach Numakawa
Head coach of Tenryu High and Japan Under 22 delegate.
Toda and Ueno
Both are side backs for Jyoyō. Kamata teaches them some defensive techniques in the first year. Sakai also tells them what to do in some trainings and matches.

== Media ==
=== Manga ===
The series was planned by Yōichi Takahashi who wished to use the title of Bruce Springsteen's song "Hungry Heart" which he enjoyed. While developing the manga, Takahashi also contacted Nippon Animation to make an anime series at the same time. Despite being based on the Hungry Heart, Takahashi stated that the two would be highly different. The manga was serialized in Akita Shoten's shōnen manga magazine Weekly Shōnen Champion from January 24, 2002, to February 10, 2005. (Note: The series finished in the 11th issue of 2005 (cover date February 24), released on February 10 of the same year.) Akita Shoten collected its chapters in six tankōbon volumes, released from November 7, 2002, to April 8, 2005.

==== Volume list ====
No.	Japanese release date	Japanese ISBN
1	November 7, 2002	4-253-20375-2
2	November 20, 2003	4-253-20376-0
3	September 2, 2004	4-253-20377-9
4	December 9, 2004	4-253-20378-7
5	February 8, 2005	4-253-20379-5
6	April 8, 2005	4-253-20380-9

=== Anime ===
A Hungry Heart anime series retitled Hungry Heart: Wild Striker was produced by Nippon Animation and Animax. Satoshi Saga directed the series while Ken'ichi Imaizumi was in charge of characters designs which were significantly different from the ones from the manga. The series aired in Japan in Animax between September 11, 2002, and September 10, 2003, spanning a total of 52 episodes. Pony Canyon collected the series in a total of thirteen DVD volumes released in Japan between February 19, 2003, and March 17, 2004. All of the DVD covers use color illustrations by Yōichi Takahashi. The series was broadcast in Latin America, Portugal, and the Philippines but was unavailable in English as of 2015. The series was streamed on the AnimeLog YouTube channel in 2020 in English, Portuguese, and Spanish.

The series uses two opening themes starting with Kids Alive's "2nd Stage". It is replaced in episode 43 by "Hungry Heart (Kiseki no Tsubasa)" (ハングリーハート〜奇跡の翼〜, Hungry Heart (Miracle Wings)) by Natsuki Katō as Miki Tsujiawaki featuring Athens Generation. The first ending theme song is "Mi Title" (未タイトル, Titleless) by Utaibito Hane for the first twelve episodes. It is then replaced by "Tell Tell Bōzu" (tell tell 坊主, Tell Tell Teru teru bozu) by Kokia for the following twenty-six episodes. In episode 40, Kokia's "Watashi no Taiyō" (私の太陽, My Sun) serves as the new ending theme and it is used for the remaining episodes except the final one which uses "2nd Stage."

==== Episode list ====
No.	Title	Original release date
1	"You're Kyosuke...?"; Transliteration: "Omae, Kyōsuke ka...?" (Japanese: お前、恭介か…？)	September 11, 2002
2	"Thank you... Coach!"; Transliteration: "Arigatō... Kōchi!" (Japanese: ありがとう…コーチ！)	September 18, 2002
3	"I'm Not Gonna Lose!"; Transliteration: "Zettai... Makenē~e?" (Japanese: 絶対…負けねーっ！)	September 25, 2002
4	"Me? What? Defender?"; Transliteration: "Ore? Nani> Defendā!?" (Japanese: オレ？何？ディフェンダー！？)	October 2, 2002
5	"Running Away?"; Transliteration: "Nige Makuri?" (Japanese: 逃げまくり？)	October 9, 2002
6	"Why do you have to be a forward?" Transliteration: "Nan de Fowādo Janakya Dame na no?" (Japanese: なんでフォワードじゃなきゃダメなの？)	October 16, 2002
7	"Don't Underestimate soccer! part 1"; Transliteration: "Sakkā o Nameru na!" (Japanese: サッカーをなめるな！)	October 23, 2002
8	"Don't Underestimate soccer! part 2"; Transliteration: "Kesshite Dare ni mo, Watashi wa Shinai!" (Japanese: 決して誰にも、渡しはしない！)	October 30, 2002
9	"You're a Man! What are you cowering about?" Transliteration: "Otoko no Kuse ni Nani Bibitteru no!?" (Japanese: 男のくせに何びびってるの!?)	November 6, 2002
10	"I Can see it! I can clearly see it!" Transliteration: "Mieru! Hakkiri to Mieru!" (Japanese: 見える！はっきりと見える！)	November 13, 2002
11	"Kyosuke-kun is Akanegaoka's weakpoint?" Transliteration: "Kyōsuke-kun ga, Akanegaoks no Jakuten...?" (Japanese: 恭介君が、茜ヶ丘の弱点…？)	November 20, 2002
12	"Don't be taken by the posts!" Transliteration: "Waku ni Torawareru na" (Japanese: 枠にとらわれるな)	November 27, 2002
13	"Hot-headed mister!！" Transliteration: "Bakuhatsu Atama no Onī-chān" (Japanese: 爆発頭のお兄ちゃーん！)	December 4, 2002
14	"Everyone! Gather in the Locker Room!"; Transliteration: "Zen'in, Rokkā ni Shūgōda!" (Japanese: 全員、ロッカーに集合だ！)	December 11, 2002
15	"What's That Shot?"; Transliteration: "Na, Nanda, Ano Shūto!?" (Japanese: な、なんだ、あのシュート!?)	December 18, 2002
16	"This Is It! I Can't Take It Anymore!"; Transliteration: "Mō, Gaman no Genkaida!!" (Japanese: もう、がまんの限界だ！！)	December 25, 2002
17	"I'll Drag You Out Right Now!"; Transliteration: "Ima ni Hippari Dashite Yarukara na!" (Japanese: 今に引っぱり出してやるからな！)	January 8, 2003
18	"Something Is Wrong With Rodrigo!"; Transliteration: "Nankahen yo, Rodorigo wa!" (Japanese: 何か変よ、ロドリゴは！)	January 15, 2003
19	"When I Said I'll Make It, I'll Make It!"; Transliteration: "Kimeru to Ittara Kimeru!" (Japanese: 決めると言ったら決める！！)	January 22, 2003
20	"Hesitating Is So Unlike You!"; Transliteration: "Ujiuji to, Rashikunai!" (Japanese: うじうじと、らしくない！)	January 29, 2003
21	"A Sore Loser!"; Transliteration: "Ōjō Giwa ga Warui Wa Ne~e!" (Japanese: おーじょーぎわが悪いわねっ！)	February 5, 2003
22	"What Are We Doing..."; Transliteration: "Wai-ra wa Nani o Yattorun yaro..." (Japanese: ワイらは何をやっとるんやろ…)	February 12, 2003
23	"Open-air Bath?"; Transliteration: "Rotenburo?" (Japanese: 露天風呂？)	February 19, 2003
24	"You Guys Are Too Cocky!"; Transliteration: "Omaera Namaiki Sugin dayo!" (Japanese: お前ら生意気すぎんだよ！)	February 26, 2003
25	"I'm Going to Face the World of Soccer!"; Transliteration: "Washi, Sakkā de Tenka Tottaru wa!" (Japanese: ワシ、サッカーで天下獲ったるわ！)	March 5, 2003
26	"I've been waiting for this" Transliteration: "Kore o Matte Itanda!" (Japanese: これを待っていたんだ！)	March 12, 2003
27	"Let the penalty shoot-out begin" Transliteration: "PK-sen no Kashidesu!" (Japanese: PK戦の開始です！)	March 19, 2003
28	"Do what we always do?" Transliteration: "Itsumodōritte..." (Japanese: いつも通りって…)	March 26, 2003
29	"Bring it on, Sergeant Chin!"; Transliteration: "Rai~o~ōi Age Gunsō!" (Japanese: 来ォォーイ！アゴ軍曹！)	April 2, 2003
30	"I made it, Brother!"; Transliteration: "Kitaze, Aniki!" (Japanese: 来たぜ、兄貴！)	April 9, 2003
31	"I don't feel excited at all" Transliteration: "Kyō wa, Zenzen Wakuwaku Shinai yo" (Japanese: 今日は、全然ワクワクしないよ)	April 16, 2003
32	"Kanou Kyosuke... I won't forgive you!" Transliteration: "Kanō Kyōsuke... Yurusanai!" (Japanese: 叶恭介…許さない！)	April 23, 2003
33	"It can't be...Kanou's the captain!?" Transliteration: "Masa ka, Kanou ga Kyaputen!?" (Japanese: まさか、カノウがキャプテン!?)	April 30, 2003
34	"You're 10 years too early...Bird nest head!" Transliteration: "Jū-nen Haya~eyo, Tori no Su Atama!" (Japanese: 十年早ぇよ、鳥の巣頭！)	May 7, 2003
35	"Why did this have to Happen to Kyosuke-kun too!!" Transliteration: "Kon'na Toki ni Kyōsuke-kun Made...!" (Japanese: こんな時に恭介君まで…！)	May 14, 2003
36	"What are you doing, guys!" Transliteration: "Nani Yattenda yo, Min'na!" (Japanese: 何やってんだよ、みんな！)	May 21, 2003
37	"Isn't anyone else coming!?" Transliteration: "Dare mo Tsuite Rai~ehen no ka!?" (Japanese: 誰もついて来ぇへんのか！？)	May 28, 2003
38	"Captain Esaka...!?"; Transliteration: "Kyaputen・Esaka.....!?" (Japanese: キャプテン・エサカ……！？)	June 4, 2003
39	"Eat and run woman! How long are you going to sleep?" Transliteration: "Kuinige On'na! Itsu made Neten da" (Japanese: 食い逃げ女！いつまで寝てんだ)	June 11, 2003
40	"I was finally able to come back..." Transliteration: "Yatto Modatte Koreta ze...." (Japanese: やっと戻って来れたぜ…)	June 18, 2003
41	"T-Twelve Goals !?"; Transliteration: "Ju, 12-ten?" (Japanese: じゅ、12点！？)	June 25, 2003
42	"Who's that? Sergeant Chin"; Transliteration: "Dare da, Ago Gunsō-tte?" (Japanese: 誰だ、アゴ軍曹って？)	July 2, 2003
43	"Can you give me a little time to think?" Transliteration: "...Sukoshi Jikan o Kuremasen ka..." (Japanese: …少し時間をくれませんか…)	July 9, 2003
44	"Father I'm ok now" Transliteration: "Otōsan, Boku wa Mō Daijōbu dayo..." (Japanese: 父さん、ぼくはもう大丈夫だよ…)	July 16, 2003
45	"Come Bring it" Transliteration: "Sā, Koi ya!!" (Japanese: さあ、来いや！！)	July 23, 2003
46	"Itemea Soccer?"; Transliteration: "Itemae Sakkā?" (Japanese: いてまえサッカー？)	July 30, 2003
47	"Where do you plan on taking me!?" Transliteration: "Doko, Tsurete ku Tsumori!?" (Japanese: 何処、つれてくつもり！？)	August 6, 2003
48	"You think I'm just gonna laze around here!" Transliteration: "N'na Tokoro de Chintara Yatte Rarekka" (Japanese: んな所でチンタラやってられっか)	August 13, 2003
49	"Can't you stay just a little while longer? Murakami!"; Transliteration: "Mō Sukoshi Ite Kuren ka? Murakami!" (Japanese: もう少し居てくれんか？村上！)	August 20, 2003
50	"I've been waiting for you, Kanou Kyosuke-!"; Transliteration: "Matteita zo Kanō Kyōsukē!" (Japanese: 待っていたぞ叶恭介ー！)	August 27, 2003
51	"SPIRIT OF AKANEGAOKA!"; Transliteration: "Akanegaoka Tamashī Jā~ā!" (Japanese: 茜ヶ丘魂じゃあああ！)	September 3, 2003
52	"Come back soon, Kanou Kyosuke!!"; Transliteration: "Itte Koi! Kanō Kyōsuke!!" (Japanese: 行って来い！叶恭介！！)	September 10, 2003
