= Utaibito Hane =

Japanese musical group

Utaibito Hane (唄人羽) is a Japanese male folk band. Its members are Shinichi Yasuoka and Tetsuro Honda. In 1998 they met each other and formed Hane. Afterwards they changed its name Utaibito Hane. Performing many times on the street in Fukuoka, they succeeded in winning popularity. Therefore, they came out with the song "Chiisana Hoshi no Chiisana Tabibito" in 1999. Their song "Mi Title" is the first ending of the anime Hungry Heart: Wild Striker.

== Members ==
- Shinichi Yasuoka (安岡信一, b. May 25, 1977)
- Tetsuro Honda (本多哲郎, b. August 2, 1979)

== Discography ==
=== Singles ===
	Original Japanese Title	Romanized Name	Translation of Title	Release date
1.	小さな星の小さな旅人	Chiisana Hoshi no Chiisana Tabibito	A Little Traveler from A Little Star	December 18, 1999
2.	路	Michi	Road	March 23, 2000
3.	花火	Hanabi	Firework	June 21, 2000
4.	なれずに	Narezuni	Unable to become...	November 12, 2000
5.	果実	Kajitsu	Fruits	March 14, 2001
6.	陽射し	Hizashi	Sunshine	June 20, 2001
7.	白紙の日々へ	Hakushi no Hibi e	To The Empty Days	January 23, 2002
8.	幸せのうた	Shiawase no Uta	Happy Song	April 24, 2002
9.	未タイトル	Mi Title	Not Titled	September 19, 2002
10.	青空	Aozora	Blue Sky	May 21, 2003
11.	ボーイ	Boy	Boy	June 23, 2003
12.	BORDER			August 25, 2004
13.	リライ	Rely	Rely	March 22, 2006

=== Albums ===
	Original Japanese Title	Romanized Name	Translation of Title	Release date
1.	と金	Tokin	Tokin (Pawn of Shogi)	August 23, 2000
2.	花サク	Hana Saku	Flower is Blooming	July 18, 2001
3.	音遊記	Onyuki	Story of Music Travel	October 23, 2002
4.	be here…			May 24, 2006
