= Wazap! =

- Industry: Gaming, Search Engine
- Founded: Tokyo, Japan (December 2003)
- Founders: Andreas Rührig, Christoph Kei Baron, Manri Offermann, Markus Ken Baron & Timo Meyer
- Headquarters: Tokyo, Japan
- Website: Wazap!

Wazap! is a vertical search engine, video game database and social networking site to distribute gaming news, rankings, cheats, downloads and reviews owned and operated by Eastbeam Co. Ltd. of Japan. As a vertical search engine, it indexes gaming sites and categorizes the information as news, reviews, cheats, downloads, previews and articles. The name Wazap! originates from the fusion of the Japanese word 'waza (技)' meaning 'technique' and 'up', symbolizing improvement.

== History ==
Wazap first launched in Japan in 2001 as a community website for gamers. Initially a mix of gaming news and user generated content, Wazap was then redeveloped as a gaming search and information distribution site. Following initial success in Japan, Wazap was launched in other markets, beginning with Germany in 2004 under the auspices of Wazap AG. In November 2006, Wazap launched Wazap (CN) in China. The US version of Wazap launched in June 2007.

By 2008, however, Wazap had failed to gain traction outside of Japan, and its German, Chinese and American operations were closed down. As of October 2018, it continues to operate solely in Japan.

== Executives ==
- Andreas Rührig: CEO & Co-founder
- Timo Meyer: COO & Co-founder
- Philip Gienandt: CFO
- Alexander Piutti: CCO, & General Manager, Europe
- Jeff Tang: General Manager, China
- Thom Kozik: General Manager, U.S.

== Awards ==
In 2007, Wazap AG (Germany) earned a 2007 Red Herring Award – European Division. The Red Herring award is noted as a valuable tool in measuring companies that will serve as leaders of innovation in the field of technology.
