= Akari Hibino =

Japanese voice actress (born 1959)

- 日比野 朱里
- Born: July 5, 1959 (age 67); Hamamatsu, Shizuoka Prefecture
- Other name: Yoko Ogai
- Occupation: Voice Actress

Akari Hibino (日比野 朱里, Hibino Akari; born Yōko Ogai (小粥 よう子, Ogai Yōko), July 5, 1959, Shizuoka, Japan) is a Japanese voice actress best known for her role as the young Tsubasa Oozora in the soccer anime Captain Tsubasa. Other major roles include Konpoco in Esper Mami, Asa in Project A-Ko, and Shinji in Sonic Soldier Borgman. In Hunter × Hunter (1999) she voiced Feitan, and in Rurouni Kenshin, she voiced Okita Sōji, a major character in the Rurouni Kenshin: Trust & Betrayal OVA. She was married to Yōichi Takahashi, creator of Captain Tsubasa until 2015.

== Filmography ==
=== As Yōko Ogai ===
- Captain Tsubasa (1983) as Tsubasa Oozora
- Shonen Jump Special: Kimagure Orange Road (1985) as Hikaru Hiyama
- Rurouni Kenshin: Trust & Betrayal (1999, OVA) as Okita Sōji

Unknown date

- Sonic Soldier Borgman as Shinji
- Captain Tsubasa J as Tsubasa Oozora (young)
- Captain Tsubasa: Europe Daikessen (movie 1) as Tsubasa Oozora
- Captain Tsubasa: Road to 2002 as Pinto
- Captain Tsubasa (PS2) as Tsubasa Oozora
- City Hunter as Nana Yoshida
- Doraemon: Nobita and the Dragon Rider (movie) as Little Boy
- Esper Mami as Konpoko
- Esper Mami: Hoshizora no Dancing Doll (movie) as Konpoko
- Langrisser III (VG) as Ferraquia, Ruin
- Langrisser V: The End of Legend (VG) as Ferraquia
- Megazone 23 Part II (OAV) as Cindy
- Mister Ajikko as Takashi Egawa
- Montana Jones as King Mouta
- Project A-Ko (movie) as Asa
- Project A-Ko 2: Plot of the Daitokuji Financial Group (OAV) as Asa
- Project A-ko 3: Cinderella Rhapsody (OAV) as Asa
- Project A-Ko 4: Final (OAV) as Asa
- Ranpou as Miyuki
- Rurouni Kenshin as Okita Sōji
- Shin Captain Tsubasa (OAV) as Tsubasa Ohzora
- The Super Dimension Fortress Macross as Yoshio (eps 2-27)
- Transformers: Masterforce as Cancer
- Wrestler Gundan Seisenshi Robin Jr. as Robin Jr.

=== As Akari Hibino ===
- Macross 7 (1994) as Billy

Unknown date

- Gear Fighter Dendoh as Student
- Gyōten Ningen Batseelor as Zenmime
- Hungry Heart: Wild Striker as Mori Kazuto
- Hunter × Hunter (1999) as Feitan, Menchi
- Hunter × Hunter OVA as Feitan
- Hunter × Hunter: Greed Island as Feitan
- Kiddy Grade as Yott
- Magical Circle Guru Guru as Crystal Babaa
- Papuwa as G (young); Ifuku
- The Legend of Condor Hero as Qiuqian Chi
- The Super Dimension Fortress Macross: Do You Remember Love? (movie) as Tewanton 3565
- Yu-Gi-Oh! Duel Monsters as Malik's mother
- Future Boy Conan II Taiga Adventure – Taiga
