= Yōichi Takahashi =

Japanese cartoonist and manga artist (born 1960)

Yōichi Takahashi 高橋 陽一
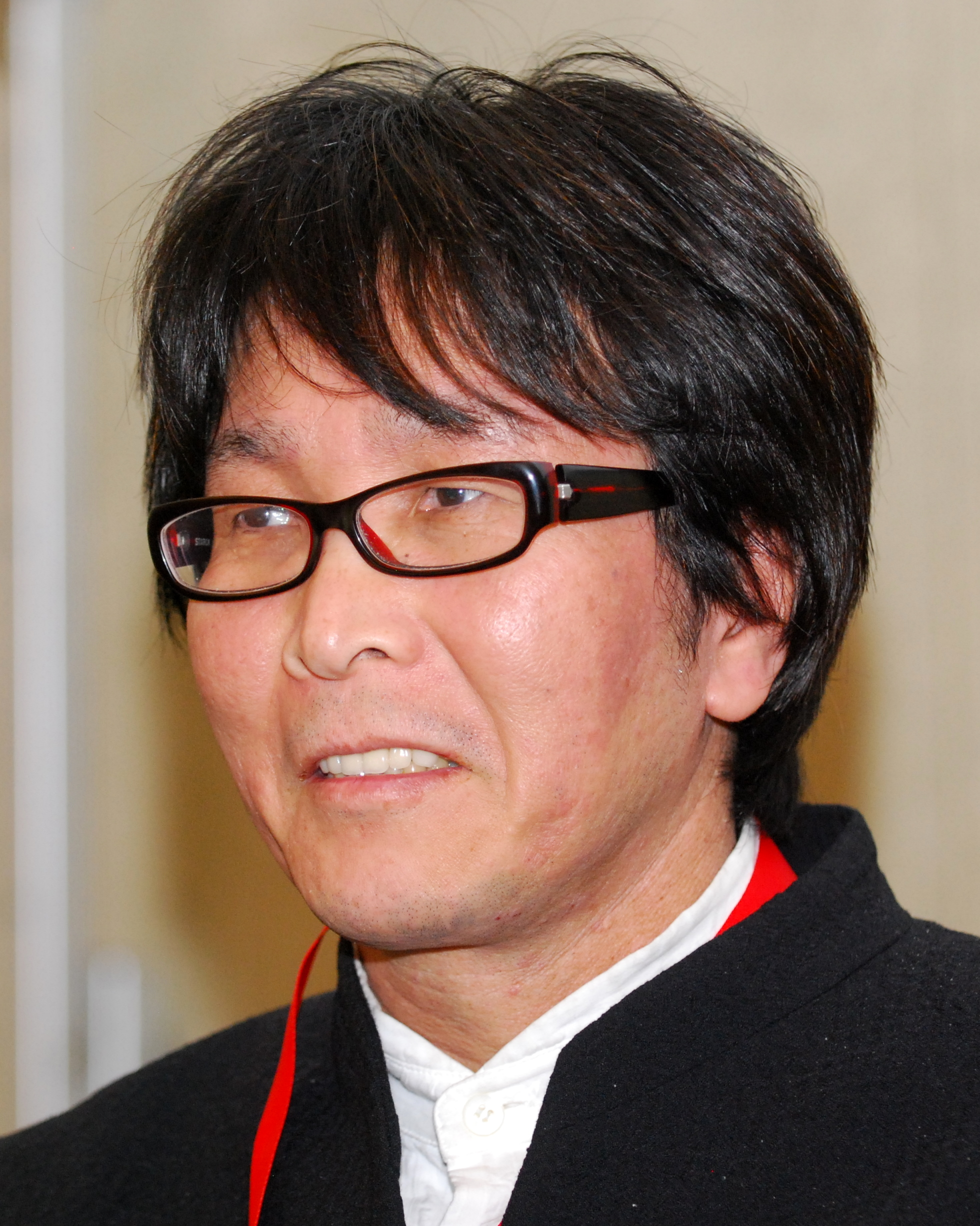
- Yōichi Takahashi at Lucca Comics & Games 2011
- Born: 28 July 1960 (age 66) Katsushika, Tokyo, Japan
- Area: Manga artist
- Notable works: Captain Tsubasa; Hungry Heart: Wild Striker
- Spouse: Akari Hibino

Yōichi Takahashi (高橋 陽一, Takahashi Yōichi; born 28 July 1960) is a Japanese cartoonist and manga artist, best known for his work Captain Tsubasa. Takahashi has published art books, manga, novels, and guides, most of which are about Captain Tsubasa. He is also known for his soccer series, Hungry Heart: Wild Striker. He is currently the chairman of Nankatsu SC.

Yoichi Takahashi visited FC Barcelona, Tsubasa Oozora's Spanish football club in the manga, on 17 January 2016 as a guest of the club.

In 2018, Takahashi received the Honorary Citizen Award from Katsushika for his contributions to the city through his manga.

== Works ==
Captain Tsubasa series

- Captain Tsubasa (1981–1988, in Weekly Shōnen Jump)
- Captain Tsubasa: 3109 Nichi Zenkiroku guide (guidebook)
- Captain Tsubasa: All Star Game (one-shot)
- Captain Tsubasa: FCRB (one-shot)
- Captain Tsubasa: Final Countdown (one-shot)
- Captain Tsubasa: GOLDEN–23 (2005- 2009, Weekly Young Jump)
- Captain Tsubasa: Golden Dream (one-shot)
- Captain Tsubasa: I am Taro Misaki (one-shot)
- Captain Tsubasa: Japan Dream 2006 (one-shot)
- Captain Tsubasa: Millennium Dream (one-shot)
- Captain Tsubasa: ROAD TO 2002 (2001–2004, in Weekly Young Jump)
- Captain Tsubasa: ROAD TO 2002 - GO FOR 2006 (5 chapters, in Weekly Young Jump)
- Captain Tsubasa: Saikyo no teki: Holland Youth (one-shot)
- Captain Tsubasa: Tanpenshuu DREAM FIELD (one-shot)
- Captain Tsubasa: World Youth Saga (1994–1997, in Weekly Shōnen Jump)

Other works

- 100 M. Jumper (1982 and 1985, two one-shots in Weekly Shōnen Jump)
- Ace! (1990–1991, in Weekly Shōnen Jump)
- Basuke (1987, in Weekly Shōnen Jump, two-shot)
- Chibi (1992–1993, in Weekly Shōnen Jump)
- Golden Kids (2008-2009, novel)
- Hatsukoi Doshi (1982, in Weekly Shonen Jump, one-shot)
- Hokuheki Downhiller!! (1989, in Weekly Shonen Jump, one-shot)
- Hungry Heart: Wild Striker (2002–2004, in Weekly Shōnen Champion)
- Keeper Coach (1998, in Shonen Jump Sports Special '98, one-shot)
- Koshu! (1998, in Weekly Shonen Jump, one-shot)
- Pride (2011-2013, in Manga Goraku)
- Sho no Densetsu (1988-1989, in Weekly Shōnen Jump)
- Shūkyū-den: Field no Ōkami FW Jin (1999, in Weekly Shōnen Jump)
- Soccer Shoujo Kaede (2011, novel)
- Subaru (1983, in Weekly Shonen Jump, one-shot)
- Todoroki Genta Ipponshobu (1983, in Weekly Shonen Jump, one-shot)
- Shenmue (video game)

== Honours ==
- Japan Football Hall of Fame: Inducted in 2023
