= SNES Mini =

SNES Mini or Mini SNES may refer to:

- New-Style Super NES, a redesign of the original Super Nintendo Entertainment System (SNES), released in 1997
- Super NES Classic Edition, a microconsole based on the Super Nintendo Entertainment System, released in 2017
