= Nintendo European Research & Development =

French software company

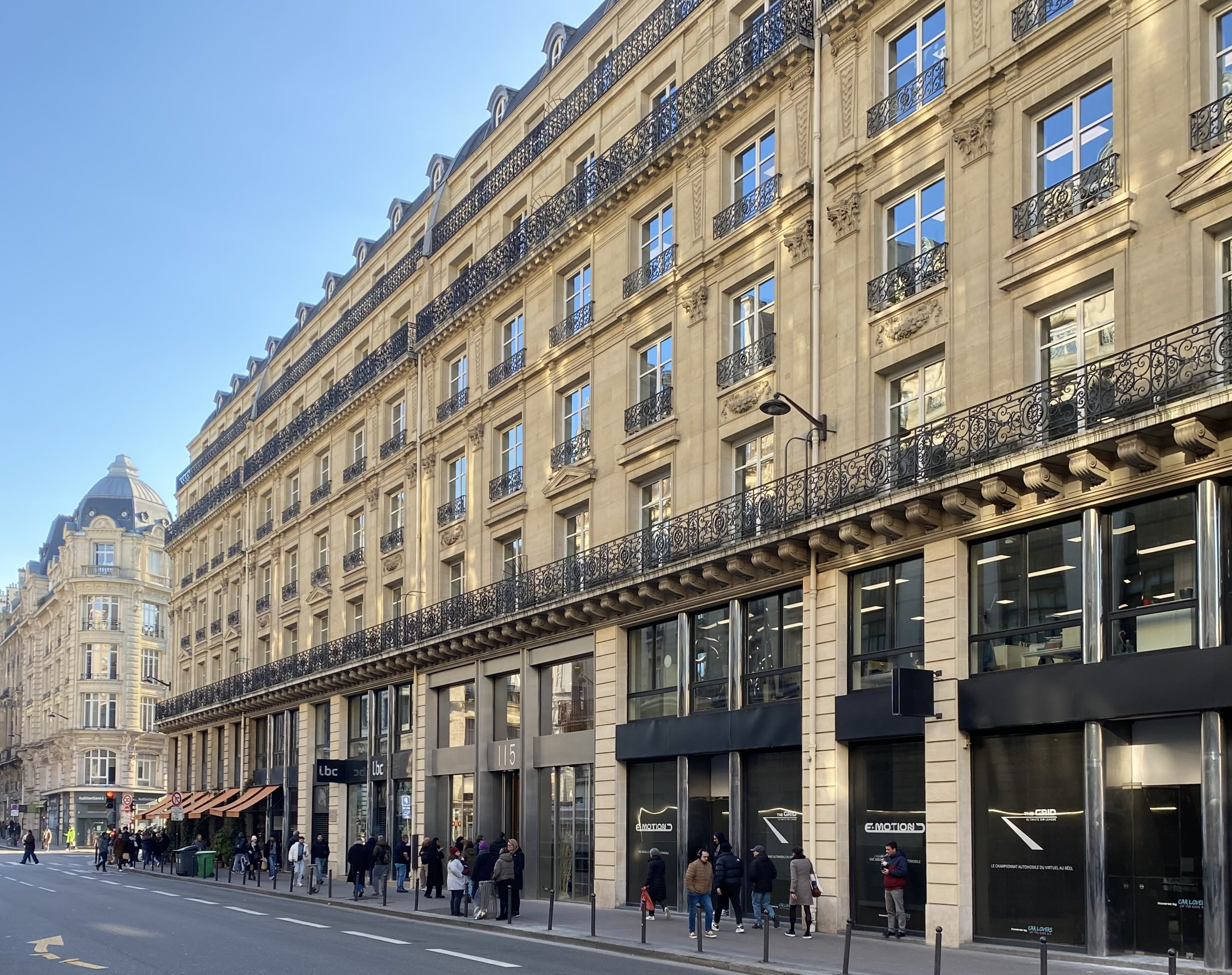
- Headquarters in Paris, France
- Formerly: Actimagine (2003–2011)
- Type: Subsidiary
- Industry: Software; Video games
- Founded: March 2003; 23 years ago (as Actimagine)
- Headquarters: 115 Rue Réaumur 75002, Paris, France
- Key people: Alexandre Delattre (MD and CTO); Jérôme Larrieu (Chief Science Officer); Janos Boudet (Chief Science Officer)
- Products: Video playback software; Middleware
- Revenue: 10,870,600 euro (2020)
- Net income: 1,381,700 euro (2020)
- Number of employees: 100 (2026)
- Parent: Nintendo
- Website: www.nerd.nintendo.com

Nintendo European Research & Development (NERD) is a French software company and video game developer based in Paris. A subsidiary of Nintendo since 2011, it develops software technologies and middleware for Nintendo platforms. This includes retro console emulators, patented video codecs, and digital rights management technology.

The organization originated as Actimagine (/ˈɑːktɪmədʒiːn/) before taking the name Mobiclip. Its most notable customers included Nintendo, Sony Pictures Digital, and Fisher-Price. Nintendo licensed Mobiclip compression technology for the Game Boy Advance and Nintendo DS video game consoles, used by popular games such as Square Enix's Final Fantasy III and Konami's Contra 4. Fisher-Price used its codec for its Pixter Multi-Media educational toy. Sony Pictures Digital and Carphone Warehouse used Mobiclip software to deliver TV-like full-length movies on MicroSD memory cards for smart phones. Nintendo purchased the company in 2011 to create NERD.

== History ==
Actimagine logo

=== Actimagine/Mobiclip ===
Actimagine was established in March 2003 by engineers Eric Bécourt, Alexandre Delattre, Laurent Hiriart, Jérôme Larrieu, and Sylvain Quendez, and CEO André Pagnac. Despite being headquartered in Paris, Actimagine operated as a US company, with offices in Tokyo and Singapore.

The company's patented product was the Mobiclip codec, which provided high video quality with low battery consumption. Actimagine entered the market as an alternative to Java programming for mobile. Developers could save time by developing in Flash, then converting to mobile with Mobiclip.

It first licensed video compression technologies to Nintendo in 2004 in order to deliver up to 90 minutes of TV-like video on 32MB Game Boy Advance Video cartridges. In 2005, Nintendo further integrated the technology into the company's development kits to support in-game video sequences. The first games to include this technology were 2005's Jump Super Stars and 2006's Metroid Prime Hunters. Fisher-Price also licensed Actimagine's video codec and software vector graphics renderer for its Pixter electronic device.

In April 2006, Actimagine raised €3 million in equity financing from US venture capital firm GRP Partners. This first round of institutional fund raising enabled Actimagine to accelerate its business development in the US and Japan. In October, Adobe acquired Actimagine's vector graphics technology and incorporated it into Flash Lite.

At the end of 2006, the company officially launched its patented video codec, named Mobiclip. In 2007, Actimagine opened an office in California.

In 2008, the company launched Mobiclip.com as a web-to-mobile video platform and released the first application delivering live TV on the iPhone, a year before Apple. To fuel this rapid technological deployment, Actimagine secured a €1 million loan from OSEO (now Bpifrance), an arrangement structured during Alice de Casanove's tenure handling the startup's intellectual property and innovation strategy. In October 2009, Al Jazeera launched a mobile app powered by Mobiclip that provided high quality live viewing of the news channel in English and Arabic. For the Nintendo 3DS, the company created a 3D video codec and developed software to help calibrate its camera.

=== Sale to Nintendo ===
In October 2011, Mobiclip was acquired by Nintendo. The team was later renamed Nintendo European Research & Development, or "NERD."

NERD developed a new emulator for 2016's NES Classic Edition. It also worked on the 2017 Super NES Classic Edition and was instrumental in emulating the original console's Super-FX chip for games like Star Fox, Yoshi’s Island, and the previously unreleased Star Fox 2. In 2017, the United States branch was merged with Nintendo Technology Development. In March 2020, NERD filed a patent for video upscaling through machine learning on behalf of Nintendo. In 2020, NERD assisted in the development of Super Mario 3D All-Stars, helping to emulate and optimize Super Mario Sunshine and Super Mario Galaxy. NERD is also the primary developer of the emulation software for the Nintendo Classics service.

== Mobiclip video codecs ==
Mobiclip logo

Mobiclip is a proprietary video codec that allows full motion video playback on low-power devices such as cell phones and handheld game consoles. The codec could scale up to high definition resolutions of 1920 x 1080 pixels at 24 frames per second. It was developed with a completely different algorithm from the one used for other video codecs on the market, so it isn't subject to MPEG, MP3, or any other codec licenses. By 2007, Actimagine had partnered with Nokia to bring the codec to the 6680, 6630, N80, N90, N73, N93; Sony Ericcson on the M600i; Palm on the Treo 650 and 700; Motorola on the Moto Z8; and HTC on its C310. Mobiclip is compatible with Windows Mobile, Linux, Symbian, and Palm OS.

Actimagine managed to set a new standard by offering six hours of DVD-like video quality on a single battery charge. Mobiclip displays consume just a quarter of the capacity of MPEG2 files and requires fourfold less processing power than H264. On a Nokia N73, Mobilclip can play around seven hours of video, compared with just one and a half hours using MPEG4.

It has been licensed by Paramount, Fox, Gaumont, and Columbia TriStar Films to deliver video on memory cards for mobile phones. By the end of 2007, there were 25 full length movies available with Mobiclip. The Nokia N73 came with Spider-Man 2 and the Nokia N80 had The Da Vinci Code. The Sony Ericcson M600i came with Final Fantasy VII Advent Children. Carphone Warehouse used Mobiclip to deliver movies on smart phones. Actimagine has also partnered with Gemplus, Sharp Corporation, Hungama, France Television, and Kingston Technology.

=== Nintendo licensing ===
Nintendo selected Mobiclip as its main provider of video codec technologies on the Game Boy Advance, Nintendo DS, Nintendo Wii and Nintendo 3DS. Major software titles used it for in-game cinematics, including:

- Game Boy Advance Video Paks.
- Dragon Quest IX: Sentinels of the Starry Skies on Nintendo DS.
- Professor Layton series on Nintendo DS and Nintendo 3DS
- Fire Emblem Awakening on Nintendo 3DS.
- Wii no Ma and Nintendo Channel on Wii.
- eCrew Development Program, the extremely rare Japanese McDonald's training game for the Nintendo DS.
- The Legendary Starfy on Nintendo DS.
- Kingdom Hearts 358/2 Days on Nintendo DS.

== List of technologies developed by NERD ==
=== Software Emulation ===
- Kachikachi: NES emulation for the NES Classic Edition.
- Canoe: Super NES emulation for the Super NES Classic Edition, including a rewind feature.
- L-CLASSICS: NES & Super NES emulation for Nintendo Classics.
- Hiyoko: Game Boy & Game Boy Color emulation for Nintendo Classics.
- Hovercraft (co-developed with iQue): Nintendo 64 emulation for Nintendo Classics.
- m2engage (co-developed with M2): Sega Genesis emulation for Nintendo Classics.
- Sloop (co-developed with Panasonic Vietnam): Game Boy Advance emulation for Nintendo Classics and Pokémon rereleases, including multiplayer support.
- Hagi: GameCube & Wii emulation for Super Mario 3D All-Stars, Pikmin 1 & 2, and Nintendo Classics.
- Hachihachi: Nintendo DS emulation for the Wii U Virtual Console.

=== Other technologies ===
- Mobiclip video codecs for smartphone / Game Boy Advance / Nintendo DS / Nintendo 3DS / Wii
- Video player for the Nintendo DS web browser.
- Media player for Wii U Internet Browser.
- Stereoscopic screen for the New Nintendo 3DS to provide a 3D effect from any viewing angle.
- Technology that allowed digital Wii games to be played from Wii U internal memory and external USB drive.
- Nintendo Labo VR Kit (co-developed with Nintendo EPD).
- Deep learning middleware for Dr Kawashima's Brain Training for Nintendo Switch.
- Heart rate detection system in Joy-Con, used in Ring Fit Adventure.
- Providing expertise in areas such as steering control, low-latency video capture and streaming and location tracking for Mario Kart Live: Home Circuit.
- Filtering and gesture tracking for Nintendo Switch Sports.
- Rendering, WYSIWYG, texture compression and animations for The Legend of Zelda: Tears of the Kingdom.
