= Captain Tsubasa =

Japanese manga series

- First tankōbon volume cover, featuring Tsubasa Oozora

キャプテン翼 (Kyaputen Tsubasa)
- Genre: Sports
- Manga
- Written by: Yōichi Takahashi
- Published by: Shueisha
- English publisher: Shueisha (digital) (Note: Published in bilingual format in 2020, the series became available in English on Manga Plus in 2025.)
- Imprint: Jump Comics
- Magazine: Weekly Shōnen Jump
- Original run: March 31, 1981 – May 9, 1988
- Volumes: 37
Further information
Anime television series
Directed by	Hiroyoshi Mitsunobu
Produced by	Hiromichi Mogaki; Hyota Ezu; Masao Kodaira
Music by	Hiromoto Tobisawa
Studio	Tsuchida Production
Licensed by	NA: Enoki Films
Original network	Mega TON (TV Tokyo)
Original run	October 13, 1983 – March 27, 1986
Episodes	128
Anime film
Captain Tsubasa: Europe Daikessen
Directed by	Hiroyoshi Mitsunobu
Produced by	Hiromichi Mogaki
Written by	Yoshiyuki Suga
Music by	Hiromoto Tobisawa
Studio	Tsuchida Production
Released	July 13, 1985
Runtime	41 minutes
Anime film
Captain Tsubasa: Ayaushi, Zen Nippon Jr.
Directed by	Hiroyoshi Mitsunobu
Produced by	Hiromichi Mogaki
Written by	Yoshiyuki Suga
Music by	Hiromoto Tobisawa
Studio	Tsuchida Production
Released	December 21, 1985
Runtime	60 minutes
Anime film
Captain Tsubasa: Asu ni Mukatte Hashire
Directed by	Noriyoshi Nakamura
Written by	Yoshiyuki Suga
Music by	Hiromoto Tobisawa
Studio	Tsuchida Production
Released	March 15, 1986
Runtime	35 minutes
Anime film
Captain Tsubasa: Sekai Daikessen!! Jr. World Cup
Directed by	Tatsuya Okamoto
Written by	Yoshiyuki Suga
Music by	Hiromoto Tobisawa
Studio	Tsuchida Production
Released	July 12, 1986
Runtime	57 minutes
Original video animation
Shin Captain Tsubasa
Directed by	Osamu Sekita
Produced by	Kaname Sakamoto; Masaki Sawanobori
Written by	Satoshi Namiki
Music by	Osamu Totsuka
Studio	Animate
Released	July 1, 1989 – July 1, 1990
Episodes	13
Manga
Captain Tsubasa: World Youth
Written by	Yōichi Takahashi
Published by	Shueisha
Imprint	Jump Comics
Magazine	Weekly Shōnen Jump
Original run	April 18, 1994 – August 25, 1997
Volumes	18
Original video animation
Holland Youth
Directed by	Yoriyasu Kogawa
Produced by	Kyotaro Kimura; Michihisa Abe; Minoru Ohno
Written by	Yoriyasu Kogawa
Music by	Takeo Miratsu
Studio	J.C.Staff
Released	November 6, 1994
Runtime	48 minutes
Anime television series
Captain Tsubasa J
Directed by	Hiroshi Fukutomi
Produced by	Etsuko Komatsu; Hidetaka Ikuta; Koji Kaneda
Music by	Michihiko Ohta
Studio	Studio Comet
Original network	FNS (Fuji TV)
Original run	October 21, 1994 – December 22, 1995
Episodes	47
Manga
Captain Tsubasa: Road to 2002
Written by	Yōichi Takahashi
Published by	Shueisha
Magazine	Weekly Young Jump
Original run	December 21, 2000 – May 13, 2004
Volumes	15
Anime television series
Captain Tsubasa: Road to 2002
Directed by	Gisaburō Sugii
Produced by	Masao Maruyama; Shinsaku Hatta; Susumu Matsuyama
Written by	Kaoru Kurosaki (screenplay)
Music by	Akifumi Tada; Yasunori Iwasaki
Studio	Group TAC
Licensed by	NA: Enoki Films
Original network	TV Tokyo
Original run	October 7, 2001 – October 6, 2002
Episodes	52
Manga
Captain Tsubasa: Golden-23
Written by	Yōichi Takahashi
Published by	Shueisha
Magazine	Weekly Young Jump
Original run	October 6, 2005 – April 24, 2008
Volumes	12
Manga
Captain Tsubasa: Kaigai Gekitō-hen
Written by	Yōichi Takahashi
Published by	Shueisha
Magazine	Weekly Young Jump
Original run	May 7, 2009 – April 5, 2012
Volumes	8
Manga
Captain Tsubasa: Rising Sun
Written by	Yōichi Takahashi
Published by	Shueisha
Magazine	Grand Jump (2013–2019); Captain Tsubasa Magazine (2020–2024)
Original run	December 28, 2013 – April 4, 2024
Volumes	20
Anime television series
Directed by	Toshiyuki Kato (S1); Katsumi Ono (S2)
Written by	Atsuhiro Tomioka
Music by	Hayato Matsuo
Studio	David Production (S1); Studio Kai (S2)
Licensed by	NA: Viz Media
Original network	TXN (TV Tokyo)
English network	US: Primo TV
Original run	April 2, 2018 – June 30, 2024
Episodes	91
Related media
Captain Tsubasa video games
- icon

Captain Tsubasa (Japanese: キャプテン翼, Hepburn: Kyaputen Tsubasa) is a Japanese manga series written and illustrated by Yōichi Takahashi. The series mainly revolves around the sport of association football focusing on Tsubasa Oozora and his relationship with his friends, rivalries with his opponents, training, competition, and the action and outcome of each football match. Across the multiple Captain Tsubasa series, the plot shows Tsubasa's and his friends' growth as they face new rivals.

The Captain Tsubasa manga series was originally serialized in Shueisha's shōnen manga magazine Weekly Shōnen Jump between 1981 and 1988, with the chapters collected in 37 tankōbon volumes. It was followed by various manga sequels. The original manga series was adapted into an anime television series by Tsuchida Production and broadcast on TV Tokyo from 1983 to 1986. Numerous movies and television series have followed with the latest one airing between 2018 and 2019; a second season premiered in 2023.

By 2023, the overall manga had over 90 million copies in circulation worldwide, making it one of the best-selling manga series of all time. Captain Tsubasa became one of the most popular manga and anime series worldwide, most notably in Japan due to how it popularized association football. Multiple real life players have been inspired to become professionals after seeing the series. In a poll conducted by TV Asahi in 2005, the Captain Tsubasa anime series ranked 41st in a list of top 100 anime series.

== Plot ==
=== Captain Tsubasa ===
Tsubasa Oozora is an 11-year-old elementary school student who is deeply in love with football and dreams of one day winning the FIFA World Cup for Japan. He lives together with his mother in Japan, while his father is a seafaring captain who travels around the world. Tsubasa is known as the Soccer no Moshigo which translates as "heaven-sent child of football". When he was almost a year old, he was almost run over by a rushing bus while playing with a ball. However, Tsubasa held the ball in front of him which served as a cushion for most of the impact. The force of the bump blew him away, but he was able to right himself with the ball. Hence, Tsubasa's motto of "The ball is my friend". Ever since he was little, he always went out with a ball. His mother concludes that he was indeed born to only play football. At a very young age, Tsubasa already had amazing speed, stamina, dribbling skills and shooting power – he astounded anyone who saw him play.

At the beginning of the story, Tsubasa and his mom both move to the city of Nankatsu, a fictional town in Shizuoka Prefecture well known for their talented elementary school football teams and where Tsubasa meets Ryo Ishizaki, a football-loving young student who often sneaks out from his mother's public bath houses and chores to play football. He meets Sanae Nakazawa (also known as Anego), an enthusiastic girl who also loves football and helps cheer the Nankatsu high school team on and Genzo Wakabayashi, a highly talented young goalkeeper whom he soon challenges to a game in Nankatsu's annual sports festival. He also meets Roberto Hongo, one of the best Brazilian footballers in the world who is a friend of Tsubasa's father and who starts living with Tsubasa and his mother in order to train Tsubasa. Roberto becomes a mentor to Tsubasa and helps him to harness his football skills, convincing him to join Nankatsu Elementary School and its fledgling elementary school football team, which Roberto later coaches as he passes his techniques onto Tsubasa.

Tsubasa meets Taro Misaki, who has travelled around Japan due to his father's job and soon joins Nankatsu. The two become friends, forming a partnership known as the "Golden Duo" or "Dynamic Duo" of Nankatsu. Tsubasa and his Nankatsu team start taking on other elementary school football teams, meeting players such as Kojiro Hyuga and Ken Wakashimazu from the Toho Academy, Jun Misugi from the Musashi school, and Hikaru Matsuyama from the Furano school in Hokkaido. Tsubasa's Nankatsu squad wins numerous Youth National Championships and he wins the FIFA U-16 World Championship for Japan by defeating goalkeeper Gino Hernandez's Italy 2–1, Juan Diaz and Alan Pascal's Argentina 5–4 in the group stages, Elle Sid Pierre's France 4–4 (5–4 p) in the semifinals and defeating Karl-Heinz Schneider's West Germany 3–2 in the finals before leaving the country to play in Brazil.

=== World Youth ===
Tsubasa leaves Japan for Brazil and starts playing, with his mentor Roberto as the manager, for São Paulo (FC Brancos in the anime), in Brazil's premier professional championship, Campeonato Brasileiro Série A, winning the finals against Flamengo (FC Domingos in the anime) 4–3. While in Brazil, Tsubasa gets to meet several talented Brazilian players, such as his teammate and roommate Pepe, who comes from a humble background, as well Flamengo star striker Carlos Santana, a prodigious yet emotionless talent.

Enthusiastic football-loving youngster Shingo Aoi, whom Tsubasa once played against while in the High School National Championship, leaves Japan to play football in Italy, where he hopes to play for a major Italian professional team. After arriving in Italy, however, Shingo gets tricked by a man who gives him fraudulent promises of getting him selected for an Italian team. After Shingo is taken to a badly furnished field, the man runs away, stealing all his money. Shingo realizes that he is swindled and tries hard to get his money back, doing such jobs as shoe-shining, until his enthusiastic attitude catches the eye of one of the coaches of Inter Milan (Intina in the 1994 anime, Lombardia in the 2001 anime), who sign him to play for their squad as an attacking midfielder.

The Japan's youth side plays the first phase of AFC Youth Championship without Taro Misaki, Makoto Soda, Hiroshi Jito, Shun Nitta, the Tachibana brothers Masao and Kazuo and Kojiro Hyuga. After Tsubasa, Wakabayashi and Shingo join the team, it defeats Thailand 5–4 after being 4–1 down at one stage. In the second phase, Japan beats Uzbekistan 8–1, China 6–3 and Saudi Arabia 4–1. In the semifinals, Japan beats Iraq 3–0. The Japanese win the Asia Youth title beating South Korea 2–0 and qualifying for the FIFA World Youth Championship.

In the group stage, Japan defeats arrogant goalkeeper Ricardo Espadas' Mexico 2–1, skillful striker Ramon Victorino's Uruguay 6–5 and Italy 4–0. In the quarterfinals, they beat the nihilistic striker Stefan Levin's Sweden 1–0 and Netherlands 1–0 in the semifinal, paying back a harsh defeat in a friendly match months before. The Japanese win in the "Great Final" of the FIFA World Youth Championship, defeating Brazil 3–2 after extra time with Tsubasa scoring a hat-trick and the golden goal despite the fact that Brazil used a new player in extra time called Natureza, who became the third person to score a goal on Wakabayashi from outside the goal area – the first being Schneider and second being Xiao Jungguang of China.

Tsubasa moves from São Paulo to FC Barcelona (FC Catalunya in the anime), in the Spanish La Liga, after the end of the FIFA World Youth Championship Finals, taking his girlfriend and now wife, Sanae. He asked her out before moving to Brazil and the couple maintained a long-distance relationship before he proposed to her after the FIFA World Youth Championship.

=== Road to 2002 ===
While Tsubasa moves from São Paulo (Brancos in the anime) to Barcelona (Catalunya in the anime), Kojiro Hyuga is bought by Juventus FC (FC Piemonte in the anime). Tsubasa plays very well in training, displaying all his skills, but the Dutch coach Van Saal (Edward in the anime, inspired by Louis van Gaal, who coached Barcelona at the time) demotes him to FC Barcelona B, the reserve team that plays in the second division, because Tsubasa and Rivaul (inspired by Rivaldo) cannot play together whilst Rivaul holds a key position for playmaking, and also to give Tsubasa experience in the Spanish football.

Meanwhile, Kojiro Hyuga plays for his first game for Juventus (Piemonte in the anime) against Parma (Emilia in the anime version) in the Italian Serie A, but does not score because his physical imbalance is exposed by Parma defender Thoram (inspired by Lilian Thuram). Juventus coach Carlo Monetti replaces him with David Trezeguet (David Tresaga in the anime), who scores the winning goal as Juventus beat Parma 1–0.

In Germany, Genzo Wakabayashi and his Bundesliga team, Hamburger SV (Grunwald in the anime version), play against FC Bayern Munich (Routburg in the anime version), led by Karl-Heinz Schneider. Wakabayashi makes many great saves, impressing players and coaches from both teams, but in an attempt to win at the final moment despite the coach's decision to aim for a draw, Wakabayashi left the goal area to take a free kick shot that was stopped at the last second, which gave Bayern a chance to counterattack on an undefended goal, allowing them to win 2–1.

In Spain, La Liga begins and the match between Barcelona (led by Rivaul) and Valencia CF (San Jose in the anime) (who have just bought Tsubasa's old rival Carlos Santana) ends 2–2. Tsubasa watches the match from the tribune (in the anime version, Tsubasa plays as a substitute in the match and scores a goal).

In the second stage of the Japanese J.League, Júbilo Iwata, led by Misaki, Gon Nakayama (inspired by real player Masashi Nakayama), Ishizaki and Urabe, defeat the Urawa Red Diamonds led by Hayato Igawa and Sawada, 2–1. In other J.League matches, FC Tokyo, led by Misugi, draws 1–1 with Consadole Sapporo, led by Matsuyama. In Italy, Hyuga and Aoi are bought respectively by A.C. Reggiana and A.S.D. Albese.

In Spain, Tsubasa plays three matches with FC Barcelona B and he records 12 goals and 11 assists in three matches. Tsubasa is inserted in the Barcelona lineup because of an injury of his rival Rivaul as well as the disastrous results of the Barcelona (one point in four matches) and plays the Súper Clásico against Real Madrid C.F., who have just bought his old rival Natureza. Tsubasa ends the match with three goals and three assists and Barcelona wins 6–5.

==== Go for 2006 ====
This is the epilogue of Captain Tsubasa Road to 2002 and it is composed of five chapters. This manga follows Kojiro Hyuga and Shingo Aoi in Italy. In this manga, Kojiro Hyuga was loaned out to Reggiana while Shingo Aoi was loaned out to Albese. Kojiro Hyuga makes a hard training and he makes his debut scoring a hat-trick.

=== Golden-23 ===
While Tsubasa plays for Barcelona against Real Valladolid, recording a goal and an assist in a 2–0 win, the 23 players of Japan's U-22 national team ("The Golden-23") are convoked to play two friendly matches against Denmark and Nigeria in preparation for the Summer Olympics. Two futsal players, Kazami and Furukawa, who previously played for Japan national futsal team, join the national U-22 football team and display great skills, scoring two goals in a training match. Meanwhile, the Japan U-20 side led by Takeshi Sawada win the AFC Youth Championship, defeating South Korea 6–5 on penalty kicks in the final. In Brazil, Minato Gamo, the former coach of the U-20 national team, tries unsuccessfully to convince Soga, a Japanese player who plays in CR Vasco da Gama, to join the national team. Meanwhile, Tsubasa's wife Sanae informs him that she is pregnant. In Japan, the match with Denmark ends 4–2 with the following scorers: Misaki (J), Haas (D), Nitta (J), Nitta (J), Matsuyama (J) and Haas (D). In Germany, Hamburger SV plays a Bundesliga match and Genzo Wakabayashi is not in the line up because of the bad relationship with the coach Zeeman, starting rumors that Wakabayashi would leave Hamburger SV. A lot of teams were interested in signing Wakabayashi such as ACF Fiorentina, A.S. Roma, Bayern Munich and SV Werder Bremen.

Meanwhile, Minato Gamo wants to convince Igawa, a player who can play in all the roles (goalkeeper, defender, midfielder and forward), to join the national team. Also in Spain, Barcelona plays a league match against Real Betis and Tsubasa scores two goals and makes an assist for Rikaar. In Japan, Wakabayashi joins the national team.

The match between Japan and Nigeria begins and Nigeria plays very well, as it has two champions Ochado (who plays in Paris SG, based on Jay-Jay Okocha) and Bobang (who plays with Shingo Aoi in Albese). After some minutes from the beginning of the match, Nigeria has the first great opportunity to score the first goal in the match with a penalty kick, but the Japanese goalkeeper Genzo Wakabayashi saves in corner kick. Wakabayashi saves another shot and makes an assist for Ken Wakashimazu, who scores a goal with an overhead kick. However, Nigeria scores two goals with Bobang and Ochado. At the end of the first half, Nigeria is winning 2–1. Meanwhile, Minato Gamo convinces Gakuto Igawa to join the national team. The second half begins, the Japan attacks during the injury time Misaki scores the equalizing goal. The match ends 2–2.

In Spain, Barcelona wins 3–2 the match against Valencia led by Carlos Santana. In Japan, the match between Japan and Paraguay ends 3–0 with the following scorers: Gakuto, Wakashimazu and Nitta. In Spain, Barcelona plays against Atlético Madrid and Fersio Torres (inspired by Fernando Torres) quickly scores a goal. However, Barcelona replies quickly and Tsubasa scores two goals.

The Asia qualifications begins and Japan beats Malaysia (6–0 for the first match and 5–0 for the return match), Thailand (2–0 for the first match, 3–0 for the return match) and Bahrain (3–0 for the first match and 5–0 for the return match) and qualifies to the third round. In the third round, Japan beats Vietnam 5–0, draws against Saudi Arabia 1–1 and loses against Australia 3–1. Standings after day 3 (of 6): Australia 9, Japan and Saudi Arabia 4 and Vietnam 0. Only the first classified is admitted to the Olympic Games. In the day 4, Japan defeats Saudi Arabia 2–0 while Australia defeats Vietnam 5–0. In day 5, Japan defeats Vietnam 4–0 and Australia draws against Saudi Arabia 1–1. Standings after day 5 (of 6): Australia 13, Japan 10, Saudi Arabia 5 and Vietnam 0. In the last day, Japan plays against Australia (had Japan defeated Australia 3–0, 4–1, 5–2 and 6–3 or more, it would have qualified to Olympic Games, while had Japan won 3–1, 4–2, 5–3 or such, it would have played a playoff against Australia). Japan scores the first goal of the match against Australia, thanks to Tachibana brothers. However, the Tachibana brothers get injured and are substituted by Wakashimazu and Nitta, who scores another goal. Japan tries to score the third goal, but all their shots hit the bar or are saved by the goalkeeper. In the second half, Australia scores the goal of 2–1, but Japan reacts and scores two goals (scorers: Igawa and Misaki). Japan ultimately wins 4–1 and qualifies to Olympic Games.

=== Kaigai Gekitō-hen ===
==== Italy ====
One-shot released in Japan in 2009, which comprises 24 chapters. This one-shot tells the Serie C1 final season match between Reggiana and Albese, with both teams directly vying for promotion. This match is the challenge between Kojiro Hyuga (Reggiana) and Shingo Aoi (Albese). Hyuga scores two goals in the first half, showing to be strongly improved in physical game. However, in the second half, Albese reacts and scores two goals. Hyuga eventually scores the victory goal in the last minute, allowing his team to be promoted into Serie B. Albese is disappointed for its defeat because they wrongly think that U.C. AlbinoLeffe won against Ravenna FC and overtook them in standings. However, AlbinoLeffe lost 2–1 to Ravenna, tying both teams in third place, and this means that both Reggiana (1st) and Albese (2nd) are promoted. Both teams celebrate their promotion.

==== Spain ====
This one-shot started in February 2010, in order to celebrate the series' 30th anniversary. It tells the return match between Barcelona and Real Madrid. From there on, seven more chapters are added in which first two goals from Barcelona been rejected by the referee. The match goes on and Rivaul finally scores a genuine goal, followed by one from Real Madrid. In the second half, Natureza scores the second goal 10 minutes before the end of the match. Tsubasa scores the draw goal with a flying drive shot in the added time and the match ends 2–2.

=== Rising Sun ===
After celebrating his Spanish League title win with Barcelona, Tsubasa briefly returns to Japan with Sanae, who is nearing childbirth. He then heads to Mexico to join the Japanese Olympic national team training camp. Following two friendly matches against New Zealand and Mexico, Coach Kira announces the final 23-man squad for the tournament in Madrid. Japan is drawn into a challenging group with the Netherlands, Argentina, and Nigeria. Despite the tough competition, they exceed expectations by winning all three matches and advance to the knockout stage as group leaders.

In the quarterfinals, Brazil—led by Rivaul—draws with Germany but secures the top spot in their group thanks to goal difference, while Germany moves on as the runner-up. Spain defeats Mexico, France overcomes the United States, and Brazil knocks out Argentina. Japan faces Germany in a fiercely contested match and ultimately triumphs in the second period of extra time. In the first semifinal, Brazil easily beats France to secure their place in the final, where they will face the winner of the Japan vs. Spain showdown. The series is left unfinished due to the author's retirement.

== Production ==
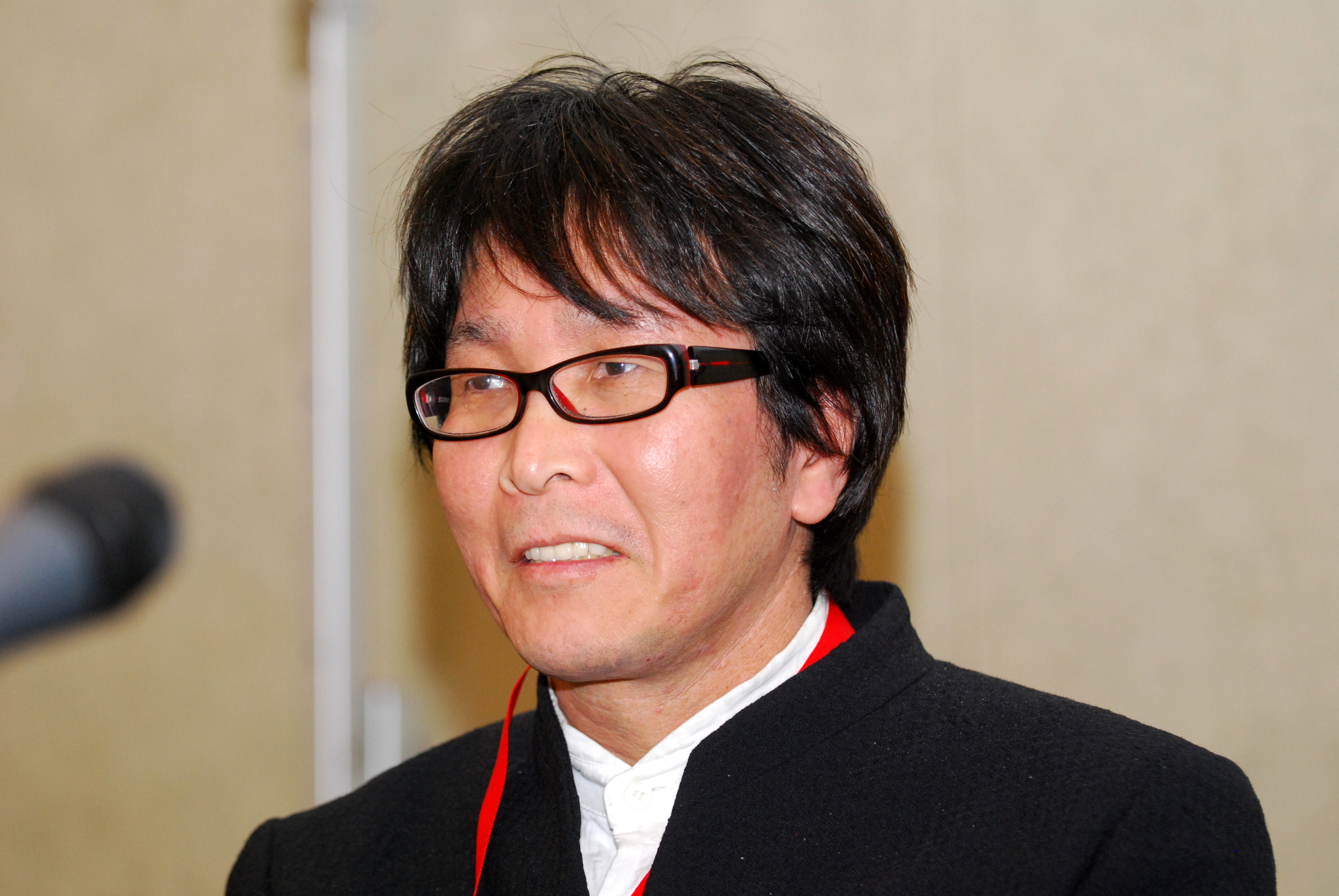
Author Yōichi Takahashi was inspired to write Captain Tsubasa after watching the 1978 FIFA World Cup.

Yoichi Takahashi was delighted by association football after seeing the 1978 FIFA World Cup. The matches, players, and fans' love towards the sport inspired him to write a manga about football. Another relevant aspect on this decision was the fact that Takahashi liked football more than baseball because he considered the players to have more freedom during matches. Despite football not being popular in Japan, Takahashi aimed to depict it through his manga and to reach the general public. Because of the non-popularity of the subject, getting the approval to write the manga by its publisher, Shueisha, took between 2 and 3 years, which was also difficult since it was his first manga. Rather than using professional players, the manga author instead used children as protagonists, hoping readers would identify themselves with the cast. Nevertheless, Takahashi already had in mind that through the series the main characters would grow up and become professionals.

In the making of the cast, Takahashi designed multiple characters with different traits in order to deliver multiple traits that would serve as obstacles for Tsubasa to surpass. The large number of characters made Takahashi careful with their designs and he wanted to give each of them recognizable features. One of Tsubasa's early rivals, Jun Misugi, was given skills that surpassed the protagonist's. As a result, he gave Misugi a heart condition that would balance the match between their teams. When asked why Tsubasa's teams always win, Takahashi stated it was because he aims the manga to be long and thus a defeat would reduce its length. While the series was initially aimed at children, Takahashi was surprised at how, across the years, it has also attracted adults, as well as at the impact it had on Japan's football. When talking about its themes, Takahashi stated the main one is honor, which is meant to be superior than money, something which people value more.

As Takahashi liked European football due to its competitive level, he decided to make Tsubasa leave São Paulo and join Spain's F.C. Barcelona at the age of 21. In 1998, Takahashi traveled to Barcelona and enjoyed the Camp Nou stadium so much that he was inspired by it to make the Barcelona team Tsubasa's future team. Nevertheless, Takahashi asserted it was a decision taken at random and joked that Tsubasa would have joined the Real Madrid if he had visited Santiago Bernabéu. For this part, Takahashi started using professional players inspired by real-life football stars, most notably Rivaul (inspired by Rivaldo) who would mentor Tsubasa in Barcelona. Due to Tsubasa's inexperience in his debut as an adult, Rivaul becomes his mentor.

By 2010, the manga had been translated into French, Italian, German, and Spanish; at the time, no official English version existed. By 2017, several volumes were available in an official Arabic translation and a third of the first print run of these were donated to Syrian refugee children by the publisher, Kinokuniya. A bilingual Japanese-English version was released by Shueisha in 2020. It was to be released for a digital reading device. Shueisha launched the series digitally on its Manga Plus platform in April 2025, offering all chapters free for one week upon release before making them accessible exclusively through the platform's Deluxe Subscription plan.

== Media ==
=== Manga ===
Written and illustrated by Yōichi Takahashi, the first Captain Tsubasa started in Shueisha's shōnen manga magazine Weekly Shōnen Jump on March 31, 1981, (Note: It started in the magazine's 18th issue of 1981 (cover date April 13), released on March 31 of that same year.) and finished in the May 9, 1988, issue, with its chapters collected in 37 tankōbon volumes, released from January 9, 1982, to March 10, 1989. The series has spawned various one-shots and sequels. In January 2024, Takahashi announced that he would retire from serializing manga, and the series' final part, Captain Tsubasa: Rising Sun – The Final, ended on April 4, 2024. In April 2024, it was announced that Captain Tsubasa: Rising Sun would continue with a new story arc in the form of storyboards on the Captain Tsubasa World website under the title Captain Tsubasa: Rising Sun Finals; the first 27-page chapter was previewed on April 4 of the same year during the teaser site era, and the site opened on July 23 of the same year, releasing the first four chapters at once. The series is updated every Tuesday. On May 25, 2026, it was announced that the manga would enter a hiatus following the 100th chapter; it is set to resume on October 6 of the same year.

An official translation into Arabic was written by a Syrian man named Obada Kassoumah, who studied at Tokyo University of Foreign Studies beginning in 2012, and had enjoyed the anime as a child. Kinokuniya publishes the Arabic version and had selected Obada as the translator. Sale of the volumes began in the United Arab Emirates in 2017. To deal with differences in varieties of Arabic, Obada consulted people who spoke other varieties of Arabic and tried to make the language in the comic accessible to speakers of all varieties while avoiding stilted formality in Modern Standard Arabic. Additionally, he made instances of alcoholic beverages ambiguous as explicit depictions of alcohol would not be published in various majority Muslim countries.

==== Main series ====
- Captain Tsubasa (キャプテン翼, Kyaputen Tsubasa) (March 31, 1981 – May 9, 1988, in Weekly Shōnen Jump; 37 volumes)
- Captain Tsubasa: World Youth (キャプテン翼 ワールドユース編, Kyaputen Tsubasa Wārudo Yūsu-hen) (April 18, 1994 – August 25, 1997, in Weekly Shōnen Jump; 18 volumes)
- Captain Tsubasa: Road to 2002 (December 21, 2000 (Note: It began in the combined 3rd and 4th issue of 2001, released on December 21, 2000.) – May 13, 2004, in Weekly Young Jump; 15 volumes)
- Captain Tsubasa: Golden-23 (October 6, 2005 – April 24, 2008, (Note: It finished in the combined 21st and 22nd issue of 2008, released on April 24 of the same year.) in Weekly Young Jump; 12 volumes)
- Captain Tsubasa: Kaigai Gekitō-hen (May 7, 2009 – April 5, 2012, in Weekly Young Jump; 8 volumes)
  - In Calcio (May 7 – October 22, 2009; (Note: It finished in the 47th issue of 2009, released on October 22 of the same year.) 2 volumes)
  - En La Liga (February 10, 2010 – April 5, 2012; 6 volumes)
- Captain Tsubasa: Rising Sun (December 28, 2013 – January 5, 2023, in Grand Jump (2013–2019) and Captain Tsubasa Magazine (2020–2023); 20 volumes)
  - Captain Tsubasa: Rising Sun – The Final (April 3, 2023 – April 4, 2024, in Captain Tsubasa Magazine; collected as the 20th volume of Rising Sun)

==== One-shots and side stories ====
- Boku wa Misaki Taro (ボクは岬太郎; "I am Taro Misaki") (1984 in Fresh Jump; one volume)
- Captain Tsubasa: World Youth Special Edition – The Strongest Enemy! Holland Youth (キャプテン翼 ワールドユース特別編 最強の敵! オランダユース, Kyaputen Tsubasa Wārudo Yūsu Tokubetsu-hen Saikyō no Teki! Oranda Yūsu) (1993 in Weekly Shōnen Jump; one volume)
- Captain Tsubasa: Road to 2002 – F.C.R.B. Stadium Opening Match (2004 in Weekly Young Jump Zōkan; one-shot)
- Captain Tsubasa Short Stories: Dream Field (2006; 2 volumes) – A collection of previously published one-shot stories. (Note: Volume 1 includes: "Millennium Dream" (2000); "Road to 2002 – Final Countdown" (2002); "Golden Dream" (2004); Volume 2 includes: "Japan Dream" (2006); "25th Anniversary" (2005))
- Captain Tsubasa: Live Together 2010 (2010 in Monthly Young Jump; one-shot)

=== Novels ===
- Captain Tsubasa Mirai Bunko (2013–2014): a trilogy of light novels by Hitomi Wada retelling the first story arc of Captain Tsubasa.

=== Anime ===
==== 1983–1995 series ====
The original Captain Tsubasa manga series was quickly adapted into a TV animation series, produced by Tsuchida Production, broadcast on TV Tokyo from October 10, 1983, to March 27, 1986. This first series adapts the first 25 volumes. Four animated movies followed soon after, between 1985 and 1986, continuing the storyline. In 1989 a new animation series, Shin Captain Tsubasa, was produced by Shueisha and CBS Sony Group, Inc. and spanned 13 original video animations (OVAs). Shin Captain Tsubasa adapts the manga from volume 25 to volume 36.

==== Captain Tsubasa J ====
The series was followed soon after into a second adaptation, entitled Captain Tsubasa J, which was produced by NAS and Fuji TV and animated by Studio Comet. It was a retelling of the first volumes that continued adapting the manga where the previous series had stopped. It aired for 47 episodes on Fuji TV between October 21, 1994, and December 22, 1995, and was followed by an original video animation, Captain Tsubasa: Holland Youth, which was released in 1994.

==== Captain Tsubasa: Road to 2002 ====
A third adaptation, Captain Tsubasa: Road to Dream, also known as Captain Tsubasa: Road to 2002, animated by Group TAC, aired on TV Tokyo between October 7, 2001, and October 6, 2002.

==== 2018–2024 series ====
In 2017, another anime television series adaptation was announced. It is directed by Toshiyuki Kato and produced by David Production. It aired on TV Tokyo from April 2, 2018, to April 1, 2019. A second season, titled Captain Tsubasa: Junior Youth Arc, directed by Katsumi Ono and produced by Studio Kai aired from October 1, 2023, to June 30, 2024.

===== International release =====
All of the versions of the Captain Tsubasa animated series have been broadcast by the animation satellite television network Animax across its original network in Japan and later across its respective networks worldwide, including East Asia, Hong Kong, Southeast Asia, South Asia and other regions. English dubs of all series have aired on Animax Asia and some episodes of the English dub were released on VCDs by Speedy Video Malaysia.

Viz Media licensed the 2018–2024 anime series. An English dub began airing on Primo TV in the United States beginning August 4, 2018. Viz Media will release both seasons on two separate DVD sets on April 7, 2026.

In Arabic-speaking countries, the anime's title was changed to Captain Majid and the character became an Arab boy named Majid.

=== Video games ===
Captain Tsubasa has been adapted into multiple video games:

- The first Captain Tsubasa game was released by Tecmo for the Famicom in 1988, and used role-playing video game elements. It was released in Western regions as Tecmo Cup Soccer Game in 1992 without the Captain Tsubasa licensing, resulting in the game's graphics being completely redrawn.
- Captain Tsubasa Vol. II: Super Striker, released in 1991 for the Famicom.
- Captain Tsubasa VS: A 1992 Graphic Research game for the Game Boy.
- Captain Tsubasa 3: Koutei no Chousen: A 1992 Super Famicom game by Tecmo.
- Captain Tsubasa 4: Pro no Rival Tachi: a 1993 Super Famicom game by Tecmo.
- Captain Tsubasa: a 1994 Mega CD game by Tecmo.
- Captain Tsubasa 5: Hasha no Shōgō Campione, released in 1994, is the fifth and final installment of the original Captain Tsubasa video game series by Tecmo.
- Captain Tsubasa J: A 1995 Bec arcade game.
- Captain Tsubasa J: Zenkoku Seiha e no Chousen: A 1995 Bandai game for the Game Boy.
- Captain Tsubasa J: The Way to World Youth: a 1995 Super Famicom game by Bandai with RPG elements.
- Captain Tsubasa J: Get In The Tomorrow: A 1995 PlayStation game with traditional sports elements combined with special techniques capable to be used by some players and goalkeepers.
- Captain Tsubasa: Aratanaru Densetsu Joshou: A 2002 WinkySoft game for the PlayStation.
- Captain Tsubasa: Ougonsedai no Chosen: a 2002 sports game for the Nintendo GameCube.
- Captain Tsubasa: A 2006 PlayStation 2 that combines RPG elements and regular sports games.
- Captain Tsubasa: Gekito no Kiseki: A 2010 Nintendo DS game by Konami.
- Captain Tsubasa Dream Team: A 2017 mobile game for Android and iOS.
- Captain Tsubasa ZERO: Miracle Shot: A 2018 mobile game based on the 2018 anime for Android and iOS.
- Tsubasa Plus: A 2020 mobile Augmented reality game for Android and iOS.
- Captain Tsubasa: Rise of New Champions: a 2020 sports game based on the remade anime for the PlayStation 4, Nintendo Switch, and Windows.
- Captain Tsubasa: Ace: a 2023 competitive multiplayer online soccer game by DeNA for Android and iOS.
- eFootball: in 2024, the game collaborated with the Captain Tsubasa series.
- Captain Tsubasa 2: World Fighters: a 2026 sports arcade game for PlayStation 5, Xbox Series X|S, Nintendo Switch, and Windows.
- EA Sports FC Online: in 2026, the Chinese version of the game collaborated with the Captain Tsubasa series.
- EA Sports FC Mobile: in 2026, the Chinese version of the game collaborated with the Captain Tsubasa series.

== Reception and legacy ==
The manga series had a circulation of 70 million volumes within Japan by 2008, 82 million copies worldwide by 2018, and had over 90 million copies in circulation worldwide by 2023. In 2001, the anime series was ranked 49th in Animage's "Top 100" anime productions list. The anime adaptation has also been very popular in Japan. In 2005, Japanese television network TV Asahi conducted a "Top 100" online web poll and nationwide survey: Captain Tsubasa placed 41st in the online poll and thirtieth in the survey. In 2006, TV Asahi conducted another online poll for the top one hundred anime and Captain Tsubasa placed 16th on "The Celebrity List". The third television series was also highly popular in 2002, earning high ratings.

Captain Tsubasa has inspired prominent footballers such as Hidetoshi Nakata, Alessandro Del Piero, Fernando Torres, Zinedine Zidane, Lionel Messi, Alexis Sánchez and Andrés Iniesta to play football and choose it as a career. It also influenced Stephen Chow's film Shaolin Soccer (2001) and a line of Adidas running shoes. Manga group Clamp have also produced dōjinshi works related with the Captain Tsubasa characters.

In 2004, when the JSDF provided humanitarian assistance in Samawah, Iraq, stickers of characters from the manga were posted on "twenty-six water wagons" which became known by the children. The news was reported as an example of how Japanese pop culture could have positive results for "cultural diplomacy and regional promotion."

A bronze statue of Tsubasa Oozora was erected in the neighborhood of the anime's creator in Katsushika, Tokyo in spring 2013. Tsubasa and Misaki appeared in the video for the Tokyo 2020 Olympics at the closing ceremony for the 2016 Summer Olympics. Tsubasa and Misaki performed their twin shot in one scene and Tsubasa appeared on his own later with his signature overhead kick. In a match from Japan for the 2018 FIFA World Cup, the Japanese fans held a tifo featuring an illustration from the manga with multiple messages that supported the team.

Nippon.com (of the Nippon Communications Foundation) also made an article where they noted how Tsubasa became one of the most likeable fictional characters due to his dream and career in the series which at the same time influenced others. Espin Of noted one of the series' most notable features was how Tsubasa's skills allowed him to perform goals while his training with his teammates also generated appeal to the viewers. His passion for the football and initial relationship with goalkeeper Genzo Wakabayashi was also noted to be worthy notes. THEM Anime Reviews noted that Tsubasa obtained a highly international reputation but found the animation from the 1980s dated in the modern times. Additionally, he found Kojiro Hyuga's actions and his trainer's drinking problems might leave negative impressions on viewers. Nevertheless, they found the story appealing and wished it was licensed for an English release. PublishersWeekly.com highly praised the series, stating that its surprising length proves the success of the series. Additionally, the manga was noted not for only bringing style to football, but also likeable characters which were rightfully adapted in the anime series. In The Imperial Sportive: Sporting Lives in the Service of Modern Japan, Sandra Collins acknowledges Captain Tsubasa and Takehiko Inoue's Slam Dunk as manga that helped to popularize football and basketball, respectively, in Japan during their serializations. Similarly, Miho Koishihara referred to these two manga as responsible for increasing the popularity of their respective sports with the writer noting that Captain Tsubasa focused on realistic growth in comparison to previous works. In Sport, literature, society: cultural historical studies noted the appeal of both the manga and its title character as one of the main reasons for becoming one of Japan's most popular soccer series referencing its popularity throughout its serialization.

A series on which Captain Tsubasa exerted a great influence was Masaya Tsunamoto's Giant Killing.

During the US occupation of Iraq, the Japan Self-Defense Force put Captain Tsubasa stickers on their water trucks. At the same time, the Japan Foundation provided an Arabic-dubbed season of Captain Tsubasa to the largest television station for free.

In late 2018, Katsushika (officially labeled "Katsushika City in English) organized the "Captain Tsubasa Cup, Gotta Win!" campaign during the yearly Junior Soccer Tournament to help bring tourists to the city and keep young men active, and gave Takahashi the Honorary Citizen Award for the manga's positive impact on the city.
