= NES Classic Edition =

Home video game console by Nintendo

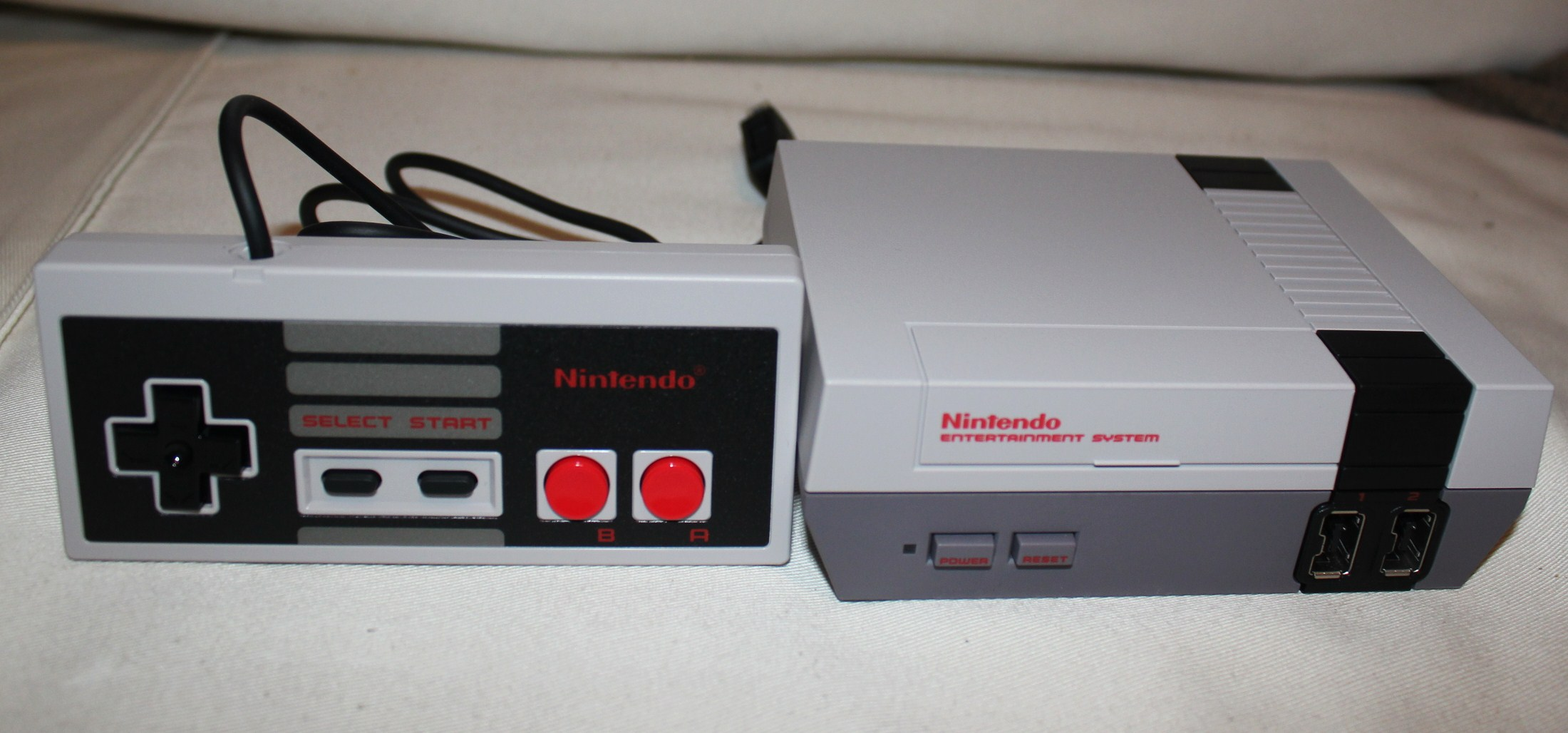
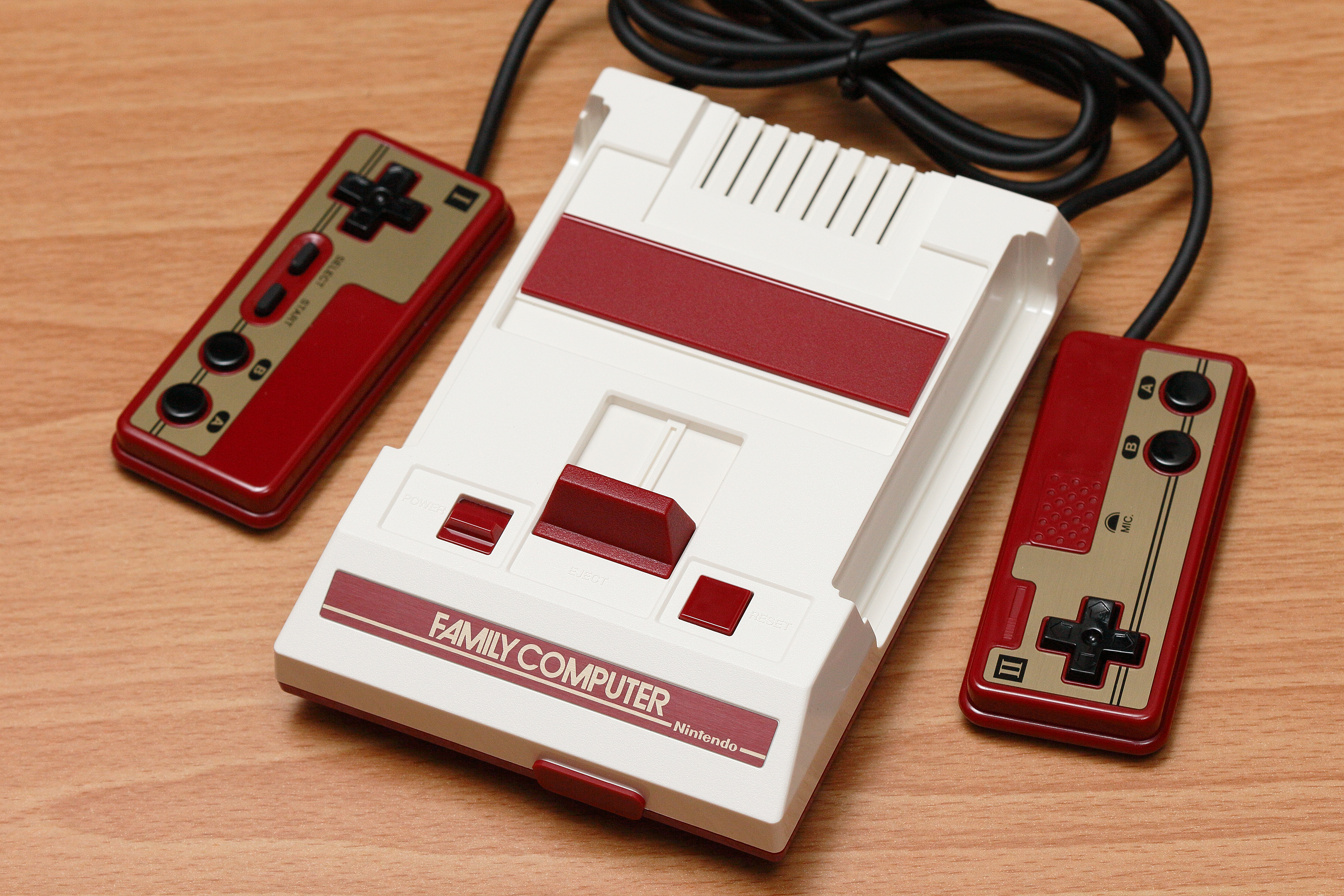
- Top: NES Classic Edition with one controller Bottom: Nintendo Classic Mini: Family Computer
- Also known as: Nintendo Classic Mini: Nintendo Entertainment System (Europe and Australia); Nintendo Classic Mini: Family Computer (Japan); Clover (codename)
- Developer: Nintendo PTD
- Manufacturer: Nintendo
- Type: Dedicated home video game console
- Released: November 10, 2016: JP/AU: November 10, 2016; NA/EU: November 11, 2016; Relaunch: June 29, 2018; Shōnen Jump Version: JP: July 7, 2018
- Lifespan: 2016–2018
- Introductory price: US$59.99; €59.95; ¥5,980; £49.99; A$99
- Discontinued: NA: April 13, 2017; WW: April 15, 2017; (original launch); December 2018 (relaunch)
- Units sold: 3.6 million (as of June 30, 2018)
- Media: Internal flash memory
- System on a chip: Allwinner R16, Quad-Core ARM Cortex-A7
- Memory: 256 MB of DDR3 RAM
- Storage: 512 MB NAND Flash TSOP48
- Graphics: Mali-400 MP
- Controller input: 2 controller ports
- Successor: Super NES Classic Edition

NES Classic Edition (Note: Known as Nintendo Classic Mini: Nintendo Entertainment System in Europe and Australia and Nintendo Classic Mini: Family Computer (Japanese: ニンテンドークラシックミニ ファミリーコンピュータ) in Japan) (Note: Colloquially known as the NES Mini and Famicom Mini) is a dedicated home video game console by Nintendo, that emulates the Nintendo Entertainment System (NES) and Family Computer (Famicom). Originally launched on November 10, 2016, the console aesthetically is a miniature replica of the NES, and it includes a static library of 30 built-in games from the licensed NES library, supporting save states for all of them.

Nintendo produced and sold about 2.3 million NES Classic Editions from launch through April 2017 — with shipments selling out nearly immediately — when Nintendo announced they were discontinuing the product, leading to consumer confusion, and incidents of greatly increased pricing among private sellers. Due to the demand of the NES Classic, and the success of the Super NES Classic Edition console, Nintendo re-introduced a limited run of the NES Classic in June 2018. Production was discontinued again in December 2018. It was well-received for its emulation quality.

== Hardware ==
The NES Classic Edition is a dedicated console for emulating 30 Nintendo Entertainment System (NES) games. The console is distributed in two versions; one for Japan, featuring the likeness of the original Family Computer (Famicom), and one for the rest of the world, which looks like the original NES. For the NES version, all of the games are based on their US release, running at 60 Hz and using the names by which they were released in the United States. While the Famicom version's interface is only in Japanese, the NES version supports up to eight other languages, (Note: English, French, German, Spanish, Italian, Dutch, Portuguese, and Russian) but neither affects the language for their games themselves.

Internally, the console uses an Allwinner R16 system on a chip with four ARM Cortex-A7 central processing cores and an ARM Mali 400 MP2 graphics processing unit. It includes 512 MB of flash storage and 256 MB of DDR3 memory.

For video output, the system features an HDMI connection, which puts out 720p at 60 Hz video for all games.

The controllers in the NES version of the console feature the Wii Nunchuk's connector, which allows the controller to be connected to the Wii Remote for use with Virtual Console games on the Wii and Wii U. Accessories for the Wii such as the Classic Controller can also be used. The controllers for the Famicom version are hardwired into the console like its original counterpart, so they cannot be used in conjunction with the Wii or Wii U. This version's two controllers are also proportioned to the size of the console to fit into its holding slots on the sides, resulting in them being smaller than their NES counterpart. The microphone on the Player 2 controller is cosmetic and does not work.

== Software ==
The console uses the Linux operating system, running a new NES emulation engine developed by Nintendo European Research & Development (NERD). The emulation included limited support for some of the memory management controllers, aka mappers, used in NES cartridges to extend the ability of the console, such as for Super Mario Bros. 3, though not all known mappers were included with the emulation engine. The emulation engine was regarded as superior in both visual and audio support when compared to the Virtual Console emulations of NES titles.

== Included games ==
Menus for the NES (top) and Famicom (bottom) versions. The NES version has an option for eight languages, while the Famicom version is in Japanese only.

Regardless of the model or region, the microconsole included 30 built-in games in all regions. Games that originally had different titles in the PAL regions use their respective American monikers, such as Ninja Gaiden (originally Shadow Warriors) and Super C (originally Probotector II: Return of the Evil Forces). From the 30 included titles, 22 are common between all regions, while the eight remaining ones are exclusive to either Japan or North America/PAL region respectively.

Games	Copyright	NA/PAL	Japan
Atlantis no Nazo	Sunsoft	No	Yes
Balloon Fight	Nintendo	Yes	Yes
Bubble Bobble	Taito	Yes	No
Castlevania (Note: The Family Computer Disk System version was released in Japan.)	Konami	Yes	Yes
Castlevania II: Simon's Quest	Konami	Yes	No
Donkey Kong	Nintendo	Yes	Yes
Donkey Kong Jr.	Nintendo	Yes	No
Double Dragon II: The Revenge	Arc System Works	Yes	Yes
Downtown Nekketsu March: Super-Awesome Field Day!	Arc System Works	No	Yes
Dr. Mario	Nintendo	Yes	Yes
Excitebike	Nintendo	Yes	Yes
Final Fantasy	Square Enix	Yes	No
Final Fantasy III	Square Enix	No	Yes
Galaga	Bandai Namco	Yes	Yes
Ghosts 'n Goblins	Capcom	Yes	Yes
Gradius	Konami	Yes	Yes
Ice Climber	Nintendo	Yes	Yes
Kid Icarus	Nintendo	Yes	No
Kirby's Adventure	Nintendo	Yes	Yes
The Legend of Zelda	Nintendo	Yes	Yes
Mario Bros.	Nintendo	Yes	Yes
Mega Man 2	Capcom	Yes	Yes
Metroid	Nintendo	Yes	Yes
NES Open Tournament Golf	Nintendo	No	Yes
Ninja Gaiden	Koei Tecmo	Yes	Yes
Pac-Man	Bandai Namco	Yes	Yes
Punch-Out!! Featuring Mr. Dream	Nintendo	Yes	No
River City Ransom	Arc System Works	No	Yes
Solomon's Key	Koei Tecmo	No	Yes
StarTropics	Nintendo	Yes	No
Super Contra	Konami	Yes	Yes
Super Mario Bros.	Nintendo	Yes	Yes
Super Mario Bros. 2/USA (Note: The international Super Mario Bros. 2 was titled Super Mario USA in Japan, and is not to be confused with the Japanese Super Mario Bros. 2, which is known in other parts of the world as Super Mario Bros.: The Lost Levels.)	Nintendo	Yes	Yes
Super Mario Bros. 3	Nintendo	Yes	Yes
Tecmo Bowl	Koei Tecmo	Yes	No
Tsuppari Ōzumō	Koei Tecmo	No	Yes
Yie Ar Kung-Fu	Konami	No	Yes
Zelda II: The Adventure of Link	Nintendo	Yes	Yes

== Release ==
The NES Classic Edition was first released on November 10, 2016, in Japan and Australia, and November 11 in North America and Europe. With the limited supply, these initial shipments sold out almost immediately.

A 320-page book called Playing with Power: Nintendo NES Classics, published by Prima Games, was released the same day as the console; the book is a guide to some of the games included on the system. Nintendo of America brought back the Nintendo Power Line as an automated phone hotline from November 11 to 13 as a celebration of the launch of the system.

Nintendo produced about 2.3 million NES Classic Editions over the next five months. By April 13, 2017, Nintendo announced it was ceasing production of the unit, with final shipments sent out within the next few days.

Nintendo's decision to stop production of the console was met with criticism due to consumer's lack of awareness of the limited availability of the console, as described below. Following the announcement of the Super NES Classic Edition, which served as a counterpart to the NES Classic Edition but for Super Nintendo Entertainment System (SNES) titles, Nintendo announced that it would also resume production of the NES Classic Edition in 2018. Nintendo brought renewed shipments of the system on June 29, 2018, with production of the system expected to continue throughout the year.

Upon its re-release in June 2018, the NES Classic Mini sold more units than the Nintendo Switch, PlayStation 4, and Xbox One.

Combined sales of the NES and SNES Classic editions by September 30, 2018, exceeded 10 million units.

On December 13, 2018, Reggie Fils-Aimé affirmed that both the NES and SNES Classic Editions would not be restocked after the 2018 holiday season, nor does Nintendo anticipate producing any similar mini-console version of its other home consoles in the near future.

== Reception ==
Aside from criticism regarding the controller cord being too short as well as minor emulation glitches, especially with sound, the NES Classic Edition has been well received.

One of many "plug-n-play" consoles on the market, the demand for NES Classic Edition was notably large, with various retailers collectively selling approximately 196,000 units in its first month, remarkably selling out within hours of availability. Nintendo reported 1.5 million units had been sold by the end of 2016. On April 28, 2017, Nintendo revealed that 2.3 million consoles were sold in total. Following the rerelease of the console, Nintendo had sold about 1.3 million additional units through June 30, 2018. Combined sales of the NES and SNES Classic editions by September 30, 2018, exceeded 10 million units.

Despite the positive reception, journalists were confused about Nintendo's decision to discontinue the unit as announced in April 2017. Nintendo did not say at launch that the system was meant to be only a limited run, and its messaging for it seemed to suggest it would be a product with a longer production life. The company clarified, when announcing the discontinuation, that "NES Classic Edition wasn't intended to be an ongoing, long-term product. However, due to high demand, we did add extra shipments to our original plans." The lack of availability of the unit since launch, with shipments immediately selling out when they reach stores, also suggested Nintendo was not prepared for the demand for the product. Nintendo of America's CEO Reggie Fils-Aimé later stated that "We just didn't anticipate how incredible the response would be", having considered the sales of other similar retro-consoles, but they had to discontinue the unit as "we've got a lot going on right now and we don't have unlimited resources."

According to an April 2017 report by Eurogamer, the discontinuation of the NES Classic was in part to transition the production line to a SNES Classic system designed similarly to the NES Classic but featuring games from the SNES, to be launched in late 2017, though Nintendo did not confirm this information. While journalists agreed Nintendo would likely be more prepared to produce a larger number of SNES Classic systems, Nintendo's decision with the NES Classic may have influenced consumers to be wary of trying to buy a system produced in low volumes, or give the impression of artificial scarcity with the product as part of a longer-term strategy to keep consumers demanding Nintendo products. When the Super NES Classic Edition was officially announced in June 2017, Nintendo said it "will produce significantly more units of Super NES Classic Edition than we did of NES Classic Edition" to avoid a similar shortage issue, but reaffirmed that it was not anticipated to be an ongoing product. In December 2018, Fils-Aimé affirmed that both the NES and SNES Classic Editions will not be restocked after the holiday season, nor does Nintendo anticipate producing any similar mini-console version of its other home consoles in the future.

=== Hacking ===
Shortly after the NES Classic Edition's release, hackers discovered ways to unofficially add up to 700 titles to the system's library, as well as enable emulation support for other consoles. Games from various consoles, such as the Nintendo 64 and 32X, have been successfully made to run on the NES Classic Edition.

=== Scalping and bootlegs ===
The NES Classic Edition's very limited stock during its original release in 2016 was one of its main criticisms, with some stores receiving fewer than 10 units at a time. This, coupled with the extremely high demand, prompted internet scalpers to buy as many as they could, so they could resell them with extreme price markups. In the US, prices were commonly set between $200 and $500, compared to its launch price of $59.99. The separate controller that could be bought without the console suffered the same fate, often being included with the main unit. The limited supply of NES Classic was compared to the situation around Amiibo shortages, which similarly were offered by Nintendo in limited quantity and led to scalping and high resale prices, frustrating fans.

When Nintendo announced it was discontinuing the NES Classic Edition in April 2017, Nintendo enthusiasts and some outlets such as Polygon and The Verge believed that Nintendo planned on a limited release of the NES Classic to drive artificial scarcity and increase sales, but which got out of hand with scalpers and secondary sales which have backfired on them. Nintendo denied these claims, stating that it was limited by its own rate of production with other hardware products, and that "It's definitely not intentional in terms of shorting the market".

Following the April 2017 discontinuation, consumers found that several bootleg versions of the NES Classic Edition appeared on third party auction sites, typically produced by Chinese companies. Some of these bootlegs have been found to be near-identical in hardware and software, which could confuse consumers who were looking to purchase a Classic Edition. One of these is called the Mini Game Anniversary Edition Entertainment System, which actually is a Famiclone, and therefore only provides composite video out.

== Limited Shōnen Jump Version ==
A very limited gold Nintendo Classic Mini: Family Computer Weekly Shōnen Jump 50th Anniversary Version was developed by M2 and released only in Japan on July 7, 2018. Celebrating the 50th anniversary of Shueisha's Weekly Shōnen Jump manga magazine, the special edition features 20 Famicom games largely based on Shōnen Jump manga properties, including Dragon Ball, Saint Seiya, and Kinnikuman.

This edition of the console includes the following games:

- Kinnikuman: Muscle Tag Match (1985)
- Dragon Quest (1986)
- Hokuto no Ken (1986)
- Dragon Ball: Shenlong no Nazo (1986)
- Kinnikuman: Kinniku-sei Ōi Sōdatsusen (1987)
- Saint Seiya: Ōgon Densetsu (1987)
- Captain Tsubasa (1988)
- Saint Seiya: Ōgon Densetsu Kanketsu-hen (1988)
- Sekiryūō (1989)
- Famicom Jump: Hero Retsuden (1989)
- Sakigake!! Otokojuku Shippū Ichi Gō Sei (1989)
- Ankoku Shinwa: Yamato Takeru Densetsu (1989)
- Tenchi o Kurau (1989)
- Hokuto no Ken 3: Shin Seiki Sōzō: Seiken Retsuden (1989)
- Dragon Ball 3: Goku Den (1989)
- Captain Tsubasa Vol. II: Super Striker (1990)
- Dragon Ball Z: Kyōshū! Saiyajin (1990)
- Magical Taluluto-kun FANTASTIC WORLD!! (1991)
- Famicom Jump II: Saikyō no Shichinin (1991)
- Rokudenashi Blues (1993)

Within two days, over 110,000 units of the Shōnen Jump Version had been sold. Reviewing for Nintendo Life, Damien McFerran criticized the unchanged design flaws from the Famicom version, along with the quality of selected titles. He did praise the packaging and called the gold casing "utterly gorgeous". McFerran noted the wide third party licensing put into this release and speculated whether Nintendo would release more third party titles on their services in the future.
