= Captain Tsubasa J: Get In The Tomorrow =

1996 video game

- Cover art
- Developer: Bandai
- Publisher: Bandai
- Series: Captain Tsubasa
- Platform: PlayStation
- Release: JP: May 3, 1996
- Genre: Traditional soccer simulation
- Modes: Single-player, multiplayer

Captain Tsubasa J: Get In The Tomorrow (キャプテン翼J ゲットインザトゥモロウ) is a Japan-exclusive action/cinematic soccer video game released in 1996 by Bandai for the PlayStation. The game is one of few to have two modes: a friendly match mode and a story mode in which the players follow the plot of the actual anime.

== Story Mode ==
The storyline immediately skips to the junior World Cup grand final between Japan and Germany. During the first match, the players will have a difficulty to score against the German keeper, Deuter Müller. However, each time the players finish a match no matter if it was a defeat or draw, players will gain experience points making the next retry easier.

After winning a number of games with Japan Junior, the focus changes to Shingo Aoi (葵新伍) in Italy just as it does in the anime. It later focuses back to Japan Junior (now part Japan Youth) in preparation for a match against Holland Youth.

While Tsubasa is away to Brazil to meet Roberto and join the Brazil League, the rest of Japan Youth members gets harsh trainings from their new coach Minato Gamo after Tatsuo Mikami's retirement, for a preparation in Asian League, until they got their fighting spirits back to overcome these harsh trainings once Tsubasa return to Japan. In the middle of Asian League against Thailand Youth, Shingo and Genzo Wakabayashi joins Japan Youth in its second round and able to win the match.

Unlike in anime, it has exclusive ending after the seven members of Japan Youth (namely Taro Misaki, Makoto Soda, Hiroshi Jito, Shun Nitta, the Tachibana twins and Kojiro Hyuga) were being given a proper training so they can be qualified to enter the Asian League. Japan Youth has a special match against the Dream Team (consisting of the most well-known stars from different countries which Japan Junior/Youth previously faced against (Italy, Argentina, Germany, and Thailand)).

== Player levels ==
Each player can reach a maximum of level 100. Increasing a player's level boosts all his stats including speed, power, stamina, and shooting. Particular players will also learn special shots at certain levels. Each player's level corresponds only to one team and one mode. For example, Tsubasa Oozora (大空翼)'s level may not be the same when choosing Japan and Japan Junior. The players have to save a data whether it is in story or friendly match mode.
