= Captain Tsubasa Vol. II: Super Striker =

1990 video game

- Developer: Tecmo
- Publisher: Tecmo
- Composers: Keiji Yamagishi; Mayuko Okamura; Mikio Saito
- Series: Captain Tsubasa
- Platform: Family Computer
- Release: JP: July 20, 1990
- Genres: Sports, role-playing
- Mode: Single-player

Captain Tsubasa Volume II: Super Striker (キャプテン翼(つばさ) II スーパーストライカー, Kyaputen Tsubasa II: Sūpā Sutoraikā) is a video game released by Tecmo on the Family Computer in 1990. A sequel to Captain Tsubasa, it features slightly upscaled graphics and improved field radar. It was the last Tsubasa game to be released on the Family Computer, since the series transitioned to the Super Famicom two years later.

== Plot ==
Three years after defeating Germany and winning the France World Cup for Japan, Tsubasa Oozora moves to Brazil alongside his coach Roberto Hongo in order to play for São Paulo F.C. Tsubasa intends to help São Paulo win the Rio Cup by overcoming six Brazilian elite teams, including Fluminense, Corinthians, Grêmio, Palmeiras, Santos, and Flamengo.

At the same time, Nankatsu, led by Taro Misaki, along with Shun Nitta and Ryo Ishizaki, competes in the High School Soccer Championship against Kunimi Gakuin, Akita, Tatsunami, Musashi, Furano, and Toho. Rivals faced in this tournament are well-known characters from the manga including Hiroshi Jito and Mitsuru Sano (Kunimi), the Tachibana twins (Akita), Makoto Soda and Taichi Nakanishi (Tatsunami), Jun Misugi (Musashi), Hikaru Matsuyama (Furano), Kojiro Hyuga, Ken Wakashimazu, and Takeshi Sawada (Toho).

In the third part of the game, Mr. Katagiri informs Tsubasa that before he can join the national team, he must win the Japan Cup against Roma, Uruguay, Hamburg, and Japan.

After joining Japan, Tsubasa leads his team in the Asian Cup against Syria, China, Iran, Taiwan, Saudi Arabia, and South Korea.

Following a friendly match against Vasco da Gama, Japan takes part in the European leg of the World Cup against Poland, England, Russia, and France.

In the last part of the game, Japan takes on Mexico, Italy, Netherlands, Argentina, Germany, and finally Brazil, managed by Tsubasa's former coach, Roberto Hongo.

== Gameplay ==
The game is a soccer simulation. There are different types of soccer moves that the player may choose, which consume the player's guts (energy). The player can choose to tackle, dribble, shoot, intercept, block or simply do nothing. Additional moves are possible depending on the position of the ball. When the ball is low, the player can do a volley shot, trap the ball, or clear. Alternatively, when the ball is high the player can choose to shoot with a header, trap the ball, clear, and in some special cases, a bicycle kick. As the goalkeeper, the player can either punch the ball or catch it. Some player characters also have special moves which consume more "guts". For the player, "guts" are limited, but the computer may use their special moves indefinitely.

When playing story mode, the player must win each match to progress. If the player loses, they must play against the previous team. Characters either gain or lose experience points towards a maximum level of 500.

== Music ==
The original score for the game was composed by Keiji Yamagishi, Mayuko Okamura and Mikio Saito (Metal Yuki). Most of the songs that play during the game's Cinema Displays were created by Mayuko Okamura. Mikio Saito composed the song for the Flamingo team (in this game the music changes according to the team in control of the ball). All the other songs, sound effects, and sound programming in the game were created by Keiji Yamagishi.
