= Captain Tsubasa J: The Way to World Youth =

1995 video game

- Cover art of Captain Tsubasa J: The Way to World Youth
- Developer: Bec
- Publisher: Bandai
- Composer: Koji Yamada
- Series: Captain Tsubasa
- Platform: Super Famicom
- Release: JP: November 17, 1995
- Genre: Traditional soccer simulation
- Modes: Single-player, multiplayer

Captain Tsubasa J: The Way to World Youth (キャプテン翼J ザ ウェイ トゥ ワールドユース) is a 1995 Japan-exclusive Captain Tsubasa video game developed and published by Bandai and was the final Captain Tsubasa game for the Super Famicom.
