= Pixter =

Portable handheld game system

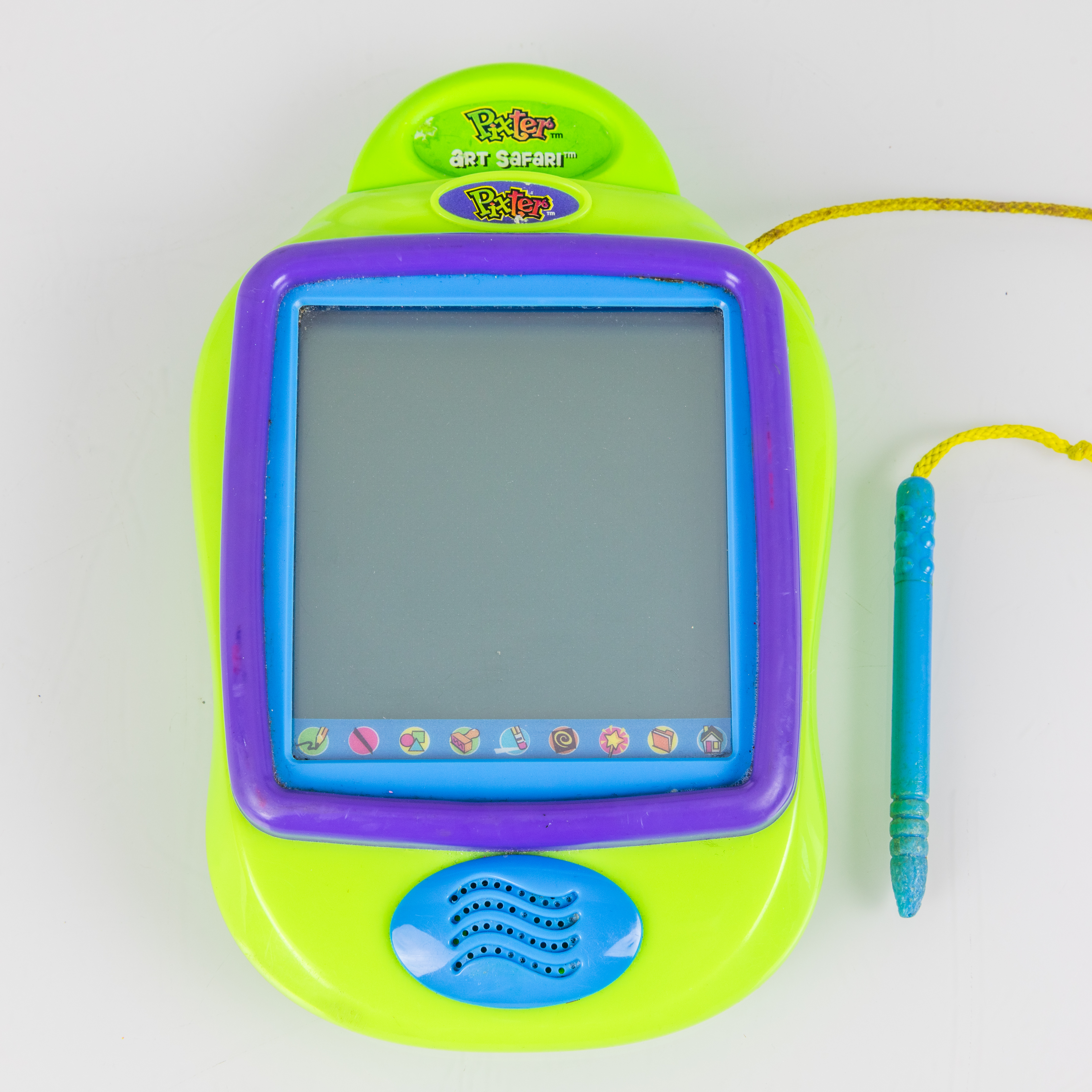
- Pixter in green
- Manufacturer: Rehco, LLC
- Website: fisher-price.com at the Wayback Machine (archived 2006-02-26)

The Pixter is a discontinued handheld game console series designed by Rehco, LLC and marketed by Mattel and its subsidiary Fisher-Price. It was among the first manufactured portable handheld touchscreen drawing toys designed for children. Marketed from 2000 to 2007, the device combined digital drawing, educational activities, and simple gaming into a stylus-controlled handheld system.

Pixter came preloaded with built-in activities and also supported cartridge-based games and creative software. Early models featured a monochrome black-and-white LCD display, which helped make the product commercially successful during its initial release. Later versions, such as the Pixter Color, upgraded the hardware with color screens, improved graphics, and expanded multimedia capabilities.

The Pixter line included licensed content from major entertainment companies such as Disney, Nickelodeon, and Cartoon Network, featuring franchises like SpongeBob SquarePants and Dora the Explorer. The series remains notable as Fisher-Price’s only handheld gaming platform and one of the last console-style products released by Mattel.

Inspired by the Apple Newton, the Pixter line has become something of an obscurity, with little information left on the internet about the history of it, sales records, original pricing, release dates, etc. It also included licensed content from Nickelodeon, Disney, Cartoon Network, BBC, etc.

The Pixter remains, as of 2017, the second to last console Mattel has released, after the HyperScan, but the Pixter is Fisher Price's first and only handheld game system.

== Gameplay ==
The original Pixter had a 80x80 black and white LCD. Its touch-sensitive LCD was activated by a drawing stylus. It used 4 AA batteries and was based around a Sunplus SoC based on a 6502 core.

== Models ==
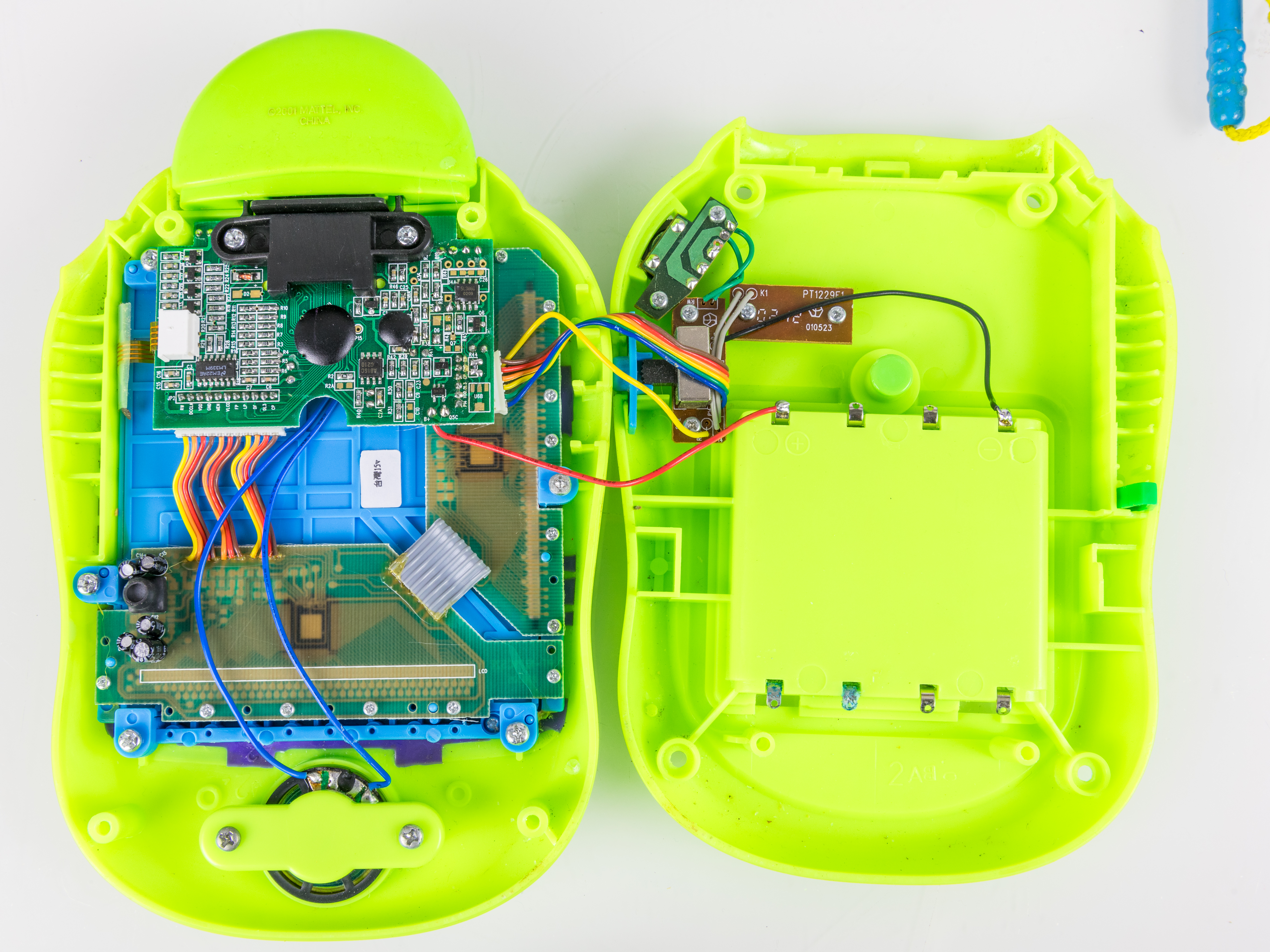
Mattel Pixter - case opened

Model	Years	SoC	Notes
Pixter	2000-2002	Unspecified 6502-based Sunplus	The original Pixter came in several colors, but otherwise they are the same unit.: Purple; Green; Blue
Pixter Plus	2002	Unspecified 6502-based Sunplus	Similar to the original Pixter, except with a "Plus" subcategory of 10 additional activities in the Pixter's main menu and 20 times more storage space than the original Pixter unit. It also has a flexible screen light.
Pixter 2.0	2003	Unspecified 6502-based Sunplus	Played the same cartridges as the original, but included digital drawing and quick-paint tools, as well as an infrared wireless link. The infrared link could be used to send messages and pictures between other Pixter 2.0s. The protocol was proprietary and incompatible with any standard like IrDA. It used 4 AA batteries.
Pixter Color	2003-2005	Sharp LH75411	Pixter Color is similar to the original Pixter, but with games using up to 256 colors and 160x160 screen resolution. The display is actually capable of 4096 colors, but only the Pixter Camera used this capability. Pixter Color used newer cartridges that could not be used with the original Pixter. With the use of an adapter, Pixter Color could play original Pixter titles. It used 4 AA batteries. The main menu of the system contains 2 unique music tracks, but outside of games or the home menu music is not implemented. It uses a 70MHz ARM7TDMI CPU, and 32 kilobytes of SRAM built-in. Pixter's motherboard also has 128 KB of additional SRAM working as Random Access Memory. On-board NOR flash is used to store one picture at a time across power cycles.
Pocket Pixter	2004-2006	6502-based Sunplus SPL130A	The Pocket Pixters were key-chain sized dedicated consoles that included a drawing program centered around a theme and a built-in game. They used three Button Cell (LR44) batteries. None of these had a touch screen, setting them apart from all other members of the Pixter family of devices. Its edition were Pets, Fashion, Sports, Dino and Hearts
Pixter Multi-media system	2005	Sharp LH79524	The Pixter Multi-Media System reportedly had 100 creative tools, games, and activities-built in, including a touch screen with stylus and had streaming video capabilities. There were also exclusive cartridges available for the system. It used 4 AA batteries.. The CPU is a sequel to the Pixter Color's LH75411

== Games/media released ==
=== Pixter, 2.0, Plus ===
- Action Art
- Arcade
- Art Safari
- Barbie: Fashion Show
- Cool Wheels
- Crazy Word Factory
- Dino Draw
- Discovery Kids' Dinosaur Adventure
- Disney Fun
- Enchanted Princess
- Learning Fun
- Learning Fun 2
- Maze Mania
- Monster Shop
- Music Studio
- Music Video
- On the Go Games
- Pirate's Treasure
- Rescue Heroes: Mission Masters
- Rocket Power
- SpongeBob SquarePants: Aqua Adventure
- Sports
- Story Composer
- The Powerpuff Girls
- Toy Designer

=== Color ===
- Alphabet Forest
- Arcade
- Arthur
- Arthur's Birthday
- Atomic Betty
- Barbie Fashion Show
- Barbie Writing
- Cars
- Clifford the Big Red Dog
- Color Pixter Digital Camera
- Creative Genius
- Cyberchase
- Dino Draw
- Dora the Explorer
- Global Passport
- Hot Wheels
- Just Grandma and Me
- Math Mansion
- Pet Shop
- Puzzles and Games
- Rescue Heroes
- Scooby-Doo
- SpongeBob SquarePants Color Aqua Adventure
- SpongeBob SquarePants 2: Math Mania
- Starter Learner Game
- Symphony Painter
- Teen Titans
- The Adventures of Jimmy Neutron: Boy Genius
- The Angry Beavers
- The Fairly OddParents
- Word Island
- ¡Mucha Lucha!

=== Multimedia system ===
Title	Released
The Best of Dora with Cartoon Creator Software	2005
The Best of Monster Jam World Finals 4 with Video Creator Software	2005
The Best of SpongeBob SquarePants with Cartoon Creator Software	2005
The Best of Winter X Games with Video Creator Software	2005
Walking with Dinosaurs with Scene Creator Software	2005
Winx Club with Scene Creator Software	2005
The Best of Friday Night Nicktoons with Cartoon Creator Software	June 12, 2006
The Best of LazyTown with Video Creator Software	Unreleased
The Best of Yu-Gi-Oh!	Unreleased but later found and dumped
