= Super NES Classic Edition =

Home video game console by Nintendo

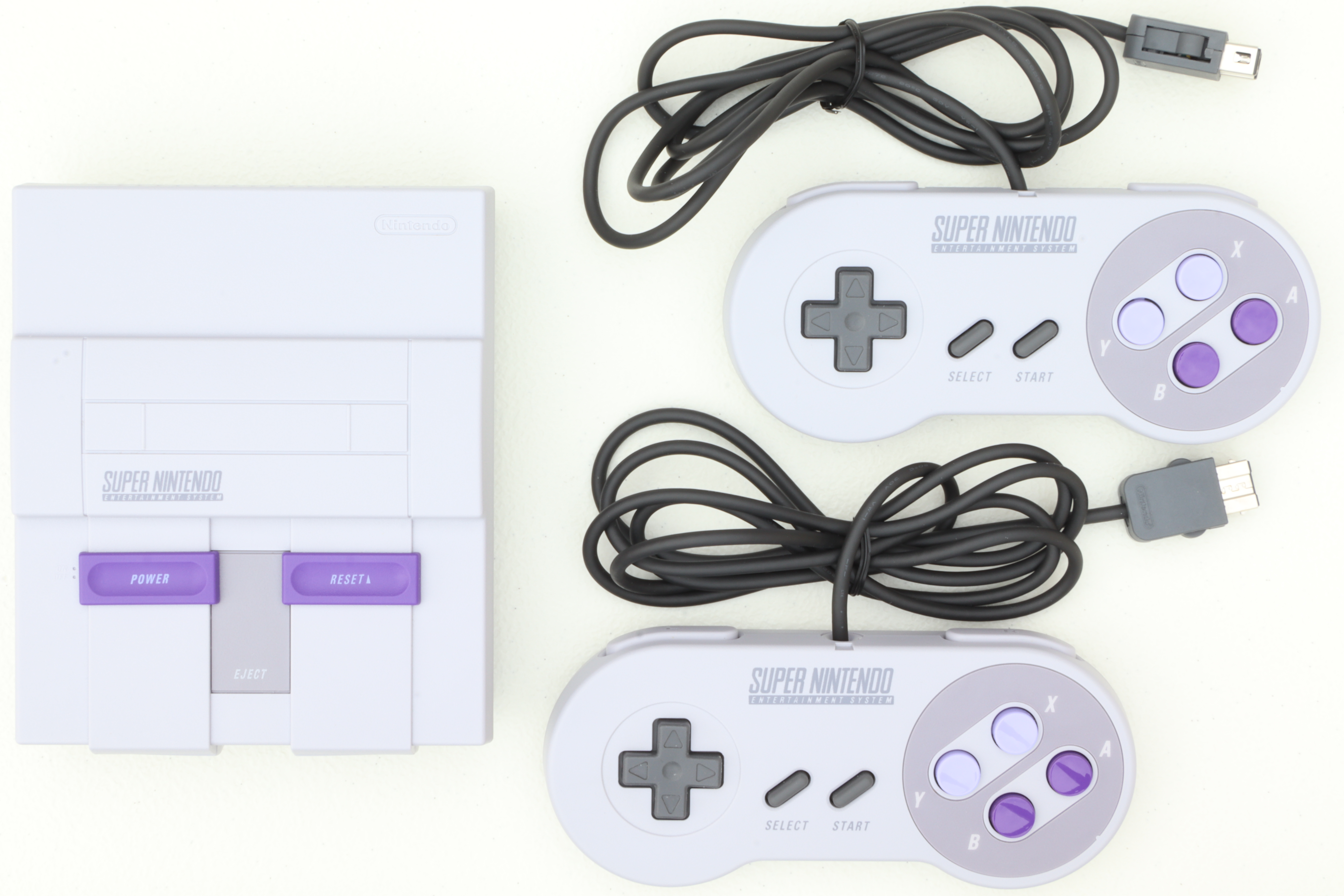
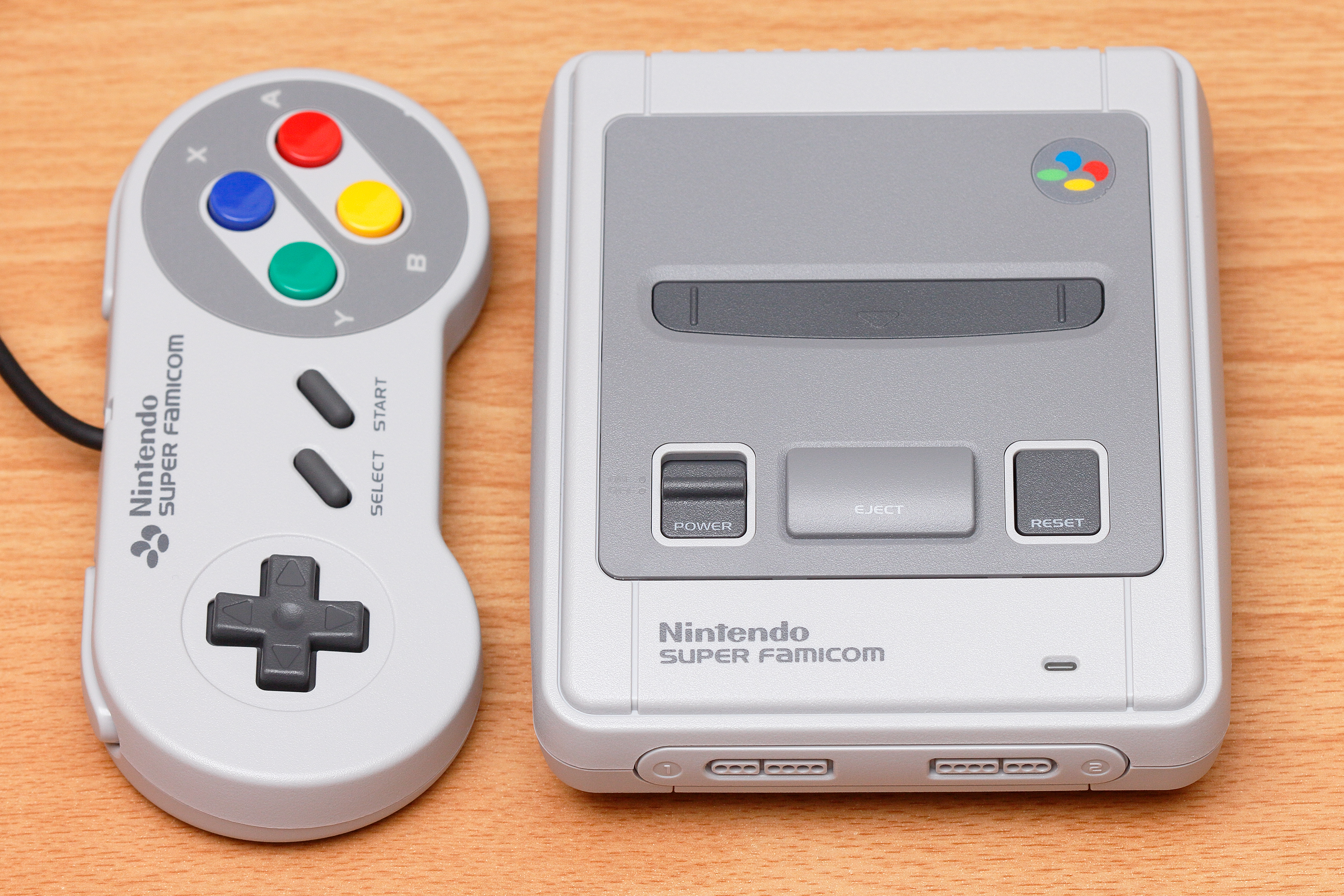
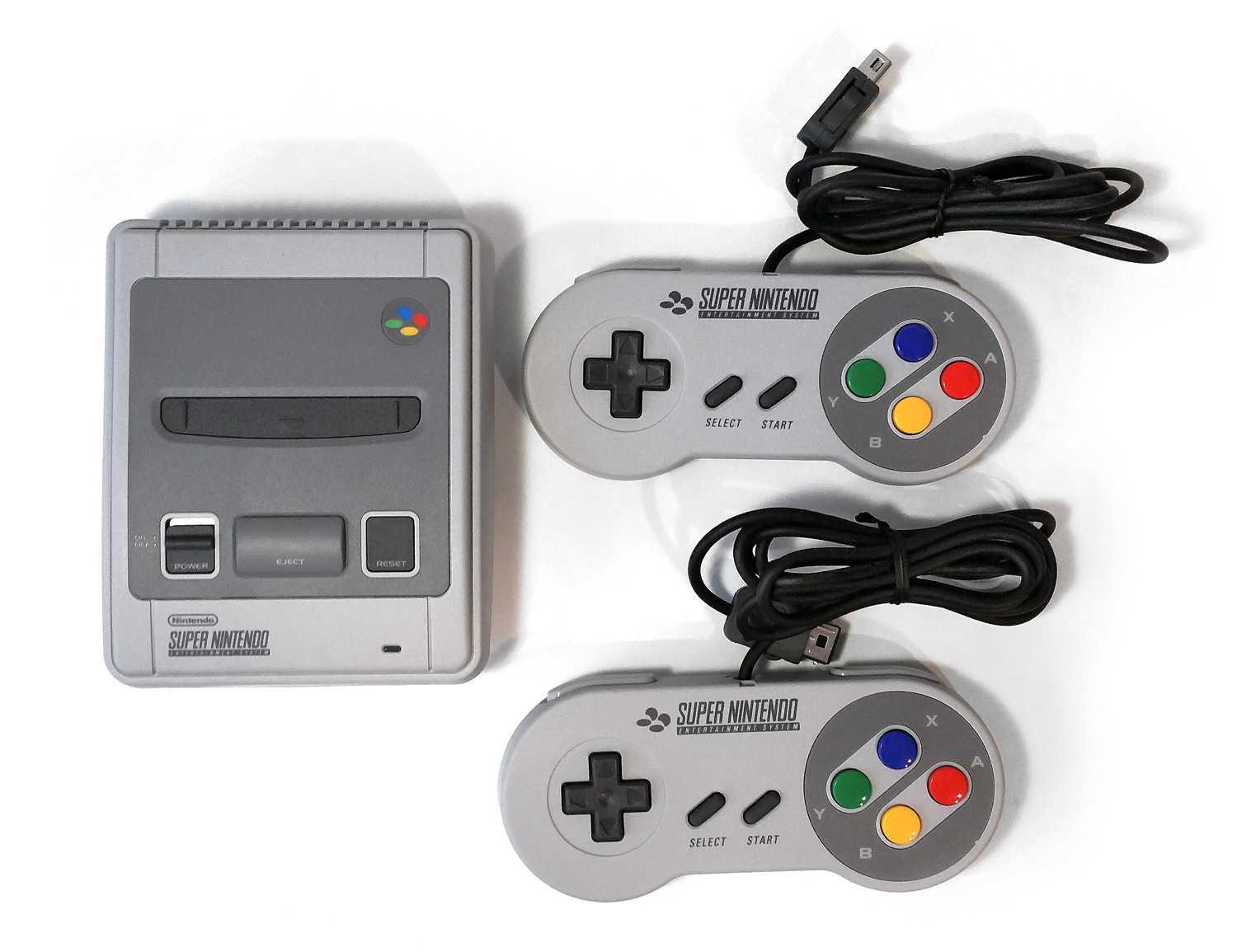
- Top: North American Super NES Classic Edition; Middle: Japanese Nintendo Classic Mini: Super Famicom; Bottom: PAL-region Super NES Classic Edition
- Also known as: Nintendo Classic Mini: Super Nintendo Entertainment System (Europe and Australia); Nintendo Classic Mini: Super Famicom (Japan)
- Developer: Nintendo PTD
- Manufacturer: Nintendo
- Type: Dedicated console
- Released: NA/EU: September 29, 2017; AUS: September 30, 2017; JP: October 5, 2017
- Lifespan: 2017–2018
- Introductory price: US$79.99; ¥7,980; A$119.95; CA$99.99
- Discontinued: December 2018
- Units sold: 5.28 million (as of January 31, 2018)
- Media: Internal flash memory
- Operating system: Linux
- System on a chip: Allwinner R16
- CPU: 4 × ARM Cortex-A7
- Memory: 256 MB of DDR3 RAM
- Storage: 512 MB NAND flash memory
- Graphics: Mali-400 MP
- Controller input: Super NES Classic Edition controller, Classic Controller
- Dimensions: 110mm × 40.5mm × 133mm (w × h × l)
- Predecessor: NES Classic Edition

The Super NES Classic Edition (Note: Known as the Nintendo Classic Mini: Super Nintendo Entertainment System in Europe and Australia and the Nintendo Classic Mini: Super Famicom (Japanese: ニンテンドークラシックミニ スーパーファミコン) in Japan, and also colloquially as the SNES Mini or SNES Classic) is a dedicated home video game console released by Nintendo, which emulates the Super Nintendo Entertainment System. The console, a successor to the NES Classic Edition, comes with twenty-one Super NES games installed, including the first official release of Star Fox 2. It was first released on September 29, 2017, and was produced until December 2018.

== Hardware ==
The console is distributed in three variations, featuring the unique design of the original systems released in Japan, North America, and Europe respectively. While the North American release features an appearance based on the straight-angled grey-and-purple design of the Super NES, the Japan and PAL region releases are modelled after the rounded edge Super Famicom/PAL Super NES design as originally released in these regions.

Internally, the console uses an Allwinner R16 system on a chip with four ARM Cortex-A7 central processing units, an ARM Mali 400 MP2 graphics processing unit, and 512 MB of flash storage and 256 MB of DDR3 memory. The same hardware was used in the previous NES Classic Edition product.

The system features 720p/60 Hz HDMI display output and two controller ports; two wired SNES controllers are bundled with the system. The controller ports are hidden behind a faux front flap which is designed to appear like the original Super NES controller ports. Similarly to the predecessor's controllers, the Super NES Classic Edition controllers have connectors that can be inserted into the Wii Remote, and be used to play Super NES games on the Wii and Wii U Virtual Console. The Wii's Classic Controller is also compatible with the Super NES Classic Edition. While the NES Classic Edition controller is technically functional with the Super NES Classic Edition, gameplay is impractical in most games due to the absence of the X and Y face buttons and the shoulder buttons.

The console runs a custom Linux-based operating system that runs a set of emulators developed by Nintendo's European Research & Development (NERD). These emulators provide the basic compatibility with the Super NES system, and for specific games, chipsets that were included on the cartridges, such as the Super FX chip used for Star Fox.

The Super NES Classic Edition includes two controllers with 4.5-foot (1.4 m) cables, addressing complaints about the short 2.5-foot (0.76 m) ones used for the NES Classic.

=== Hacking ===
Alexey Avdyukhin, known by the nickname ClusterM, who previously discovered a means to hack the NES Classic Edition, discovered a similar technique to install additional SNES games onto the unit.

== Games ==
The microconsole contains 21 built-in games. These include Star Fox 2, a sequel to Star Fox that had been cancelled near the very end of its development in 1996; while Nintendo had given no official word to the cancellation, developer Dylan Cuthbert said that Nintendo feared how Star Fox 2 would look compared to similar games on the more advanced PlayStation and Sega Saturn consoles. Players can unlock Star Fox 2 on the SNES Classic upon clearing the first level of Star Fox.

Despite the difference in hardware shells, both western editions of the microconsole feature identical software, and all included games are based on their American localizations, running at 60 Hz, similarly to the NES Classic Edition. Consequently, games that originally had different names in the PAL regions now use their respective American monikers, such as Contra III: The Alien Wars (originally Super Probotector: Alien Rebels), Star Fox (originally Starwing) and Kirby Super Star (originally Kirby's Fun Pak). Additionally, games that were originally not released in the PAL regions, such as Final Fantasy VI, EarthBound and Super Mario RPG: Legend of the Seven Stars, are included in the PAL edition of the Super NES Classic Edition.

From the 21 included games, 16 are common between all regions, while the five remaining ones are exclusive to either Japan's Super Famicom Mini or the west's SNES Mini respectively.

Games	Copyright	NA/PAL	Japan
Contra III: The Alien Wars	Konami	Yes	Yes
Donkey Kong Country	Nintendo	Yes	Yes
EarthBound (Note: EarthBound, Final Fantasy VI and Super Mario RPG were previously unreleased for the original Super Nintendo in the PAL region.)	Nintendo	Yes	No
F-Zero	Nintendo	Yes	Yes
Final Fantasy VI (Note: Final Fantasy VI was titled Final Fantasy III when it was first released in the west.)	Square Enix	Yes	Yes
Fire Emblem: Mystery of the Emblem	Nintendo	No	Yes
Kirby Super Star	Nintendo	Yes	Yes
Kirby's Dream Course	Nintendo	Yes	No
The Legend of the Mystical Ninja	Konami	No	Yes
The Legend of Zelda: A Link to the Past	Nintendo	Yes	Yes
Mega Man X	Capcom	Yes	Yes
Panel de Pon (Note: Panel de Pon is the original Japanese version of Tetris Attack.)	Nintendo	No	Yes
Secret of Mana	Square Enix	Yes	Yes
Star Fox	Nintendo	Yes	Yes
Star Fox 2 (Note: Star Fox 2 was planned to be released in 1996, but was cancelled. Its presence here on the SNES Classic Edition marks the game's first official release.)	Nintendo	Yes	Yes
Street Fighter II Turbo: Hyper Fighting	Capcom	Yes	No
Super Castlevania IV	Konami	Yes	No
Super Ghouls 'n Ghosts	Capcom	Yes	Yes
Super Mario Kart	Nintendo	Yes	Yes
Super Mario RPG: Legend of the Seven Stars	Nintendo	Yes	Yes
Super Mario World	Nintendo	Yes	Yes
Super Metroid	Nintendo	Yes	Yes
Super Punch-Out!!	Nintendo	Yes	No
Super Soccer	Spike Chunsoft	No	Yes
Super Street Fighter II: The New Challengers	Capcom	No	Yes
Yoshi's Island	Nintendo	Yes	Yes

== Release ==
The Super NES Classic Edition was revealed on June 26, 2017, as the successor to the widely-popular NES Classic. Nintendo announced that the system would come with 21 Super Nintendo games, including the unreleased Star Fox 2. It was released in North America on September 29, 2017, with a price of $79.99.

=== Criticism of availability ===
With the release of the Super NES Classic Edition, Nintendo was strongly criticized for the system's lack of availability for the console, which reached levels of popularity that they had not been fully prepared for. On July 21, 2017, the console was mistakenly made available for pre-order at Walmart in the United States due to a "technical glitch", and all pre-orders were cancelled on July 26, leading to widespread criticism among the gaming press. PC Magazine called the situation "badly handled by Walmart" and said that the future availability of the console was "not looking good". USGamer called attempting to obtain a Super NES Classic Edition a "waking nightmare" and stated the availability would likely be as low as the NES Classic, saying the situation was "because we can't have nice things". GameSpot stated that there was "frustratingly little word" from Nintendo as to when pre-orders would be made available. Nintendo gave no comment about the situation.

On August 22, 2017, pre-orders officially opened at several major retailers, causing many of their sites to crash before customers could buy the system, as well as at physical GameStop locations in limited amounts, which also sold out quickly on a first-come, first-served basis. The Target website became "glitched out", removing the items from users' carts, and pre-orders from Walmart were sold out in less than a minute. This led to Nintendo of America being criticized as "inept or underhanded", and that they contributed to a "chaotic" situation.

Polygon also confirmed that the Tai Ding internet bot was being used to quickly pre-order systems before humans could get the chance to order them, which was proving successful due to a lack of CAPTCHAs on store websites. Scalpers soon flooded eBay with pre-order listings, some at markups of over 300%.

Nintendo of America CEO Reggie Fils-Aimé stated in September 2017 that people should not buy SNES Classic pre-orders from scalpers, and suggested SNES Classics would be readily available. He also stated that the company was not trying to create artificial scarcity, saying that the issues with pre-orders were "outside our control". Nintendo has also stated that there would be more SNES Classics available on launch day than the entire amount of NES Classics that were shipped in 2016, and that shipments would continue into 2018 unlike originally planned due to high demand.

With the Super NES Classic Edition, Nintendo originally said that although they were prepared to produce significantly more Super NES Classics than NES Classics, they would be halting production at the end of 2017. Due to overwhelming demand, Nintendo changed their plans, with Reggie Fils-Aimé confirming the continued production of the system throughout 2018 alongside announcing the return of the NES Classic in 2018, which many people were unable to get after scalpers bought masses of them and resold them for much more than their MSRP. Fils-Aimé also discouraged consumers from buying from these scalpers and said there would be plenty stock of both NES and SNES. In May 2018, Nintendo of America announced via Twitter that both consoles would be in stock throughout the second half of 2018, with the NES Classic returning to stores on June 29.

On December 13, 2018, Reggie Fils-Aimé affirmed that both the NES and SNES Classic Editions will not be restocked after the 2018 holiday season, nor does Nintendo anticipate producing any similar mini-console version of its other home consoles in the future.

== Reception ==
Despite criticizing its library of games and issues carried over from the NES Classic, IGN's Jonathon Dornbush praised the Super NES Classic's features and enjoyability. Eurogamer praised the games library, the selection of border arts, the improved scaling over the NES Classic Mini, and the support of 60 Hz as well as the fact that there are now two controllers with longer cables in the scope of delivery in contrast to the NES Classic Mini. Eurogamer also found the emulation of the SNES Classic Mini to be superior to that of the Virtual Console. IGN rated the SNES Classic Mini 8.5 out of 10 points, praising the included games, the image quality, the longer controller cables and the rewind feature.

=== Sales ===
The SNES Mini sold 368,913 units within its first four days on sale in Japan. By the end of October 2017, it had sold more than 2 million units worldwide. By its fiscal year 2017 report, ending March 31, 2018, the SNES Classic had sold more than 5 million units. Combined sales of the NES and SNES Classic editions by September 30, 2018 exceeded 10 million units.

== Gallery ==
=== PAL region console and controller ===
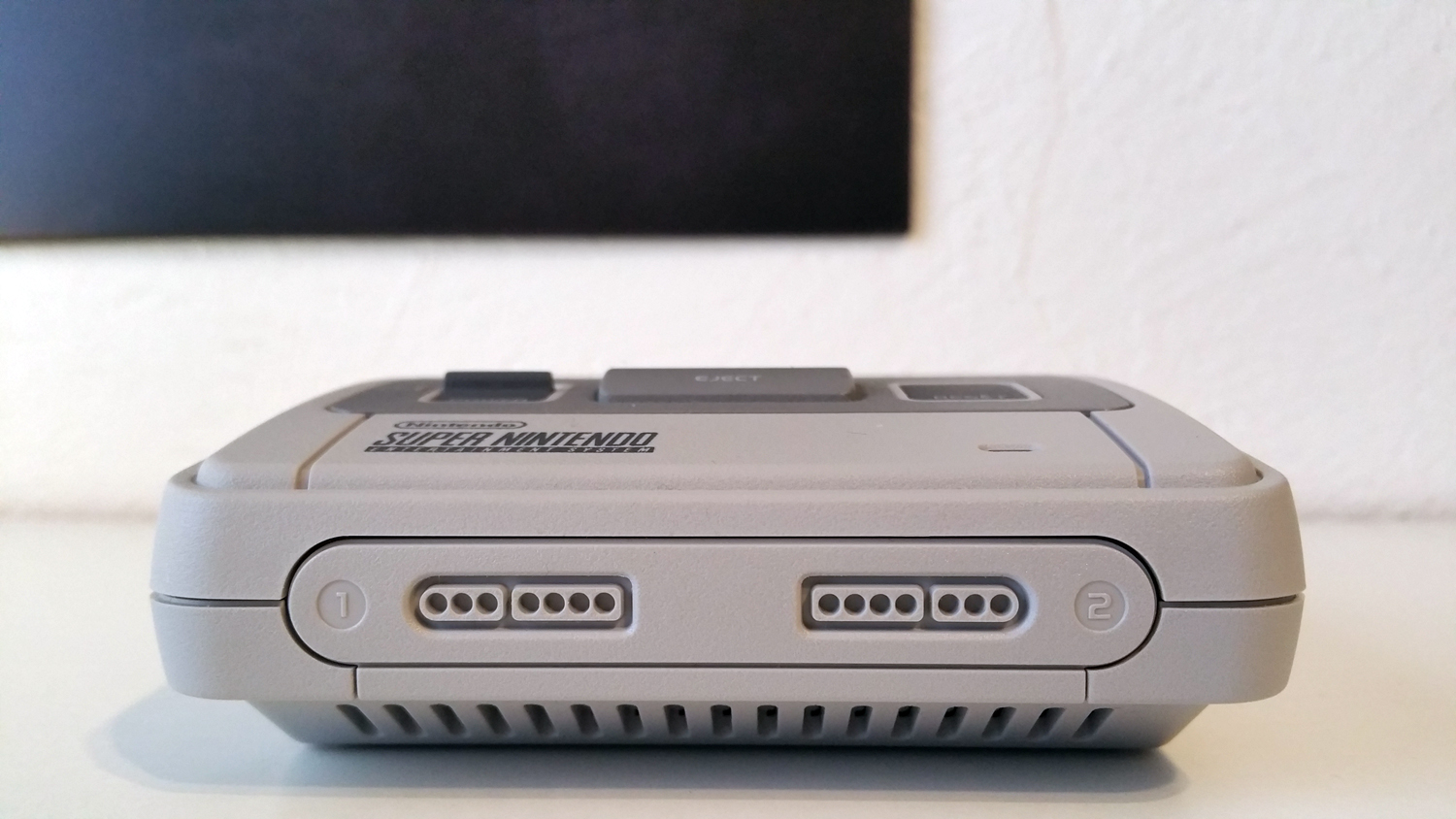
Front side

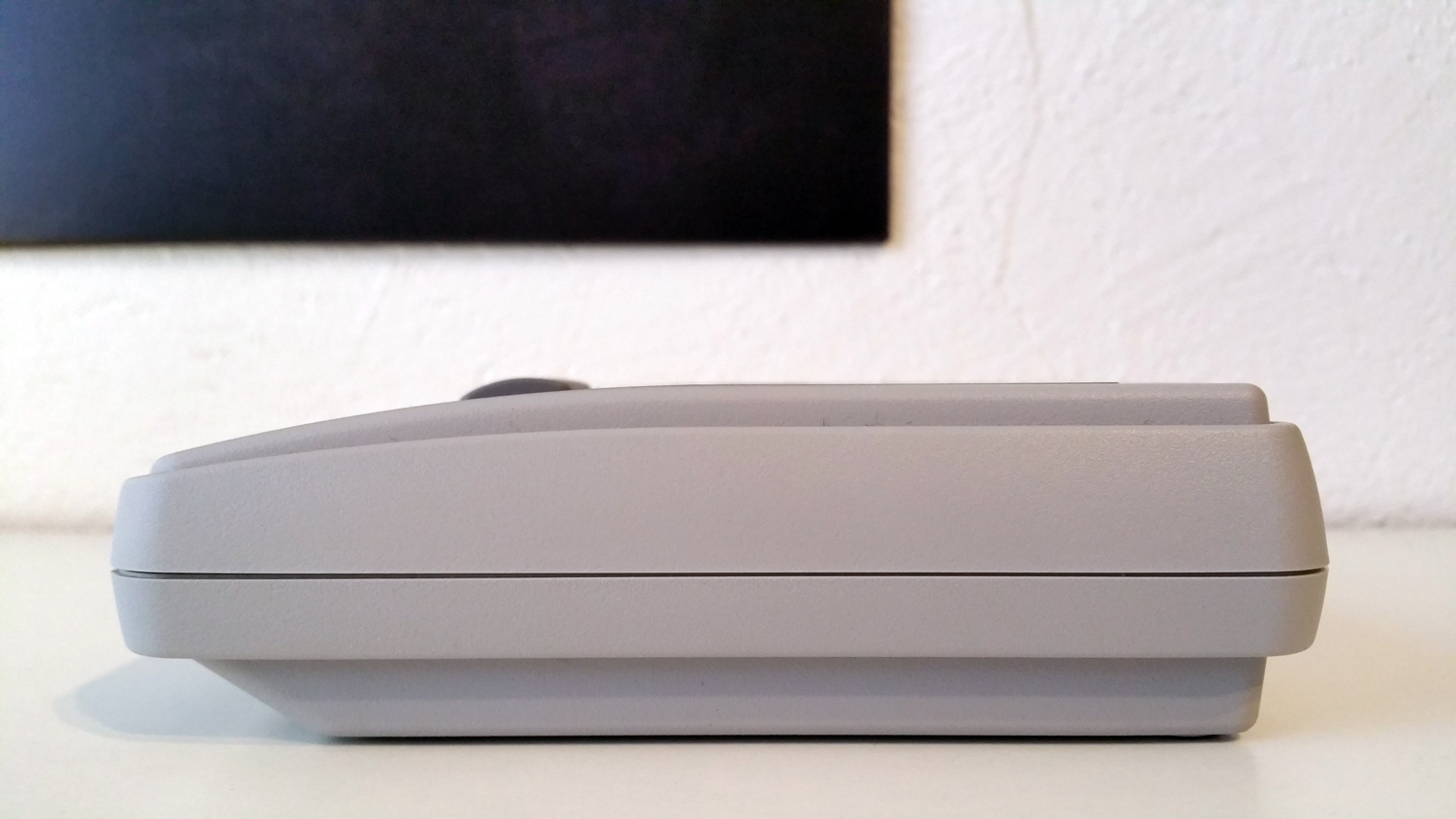
Left side

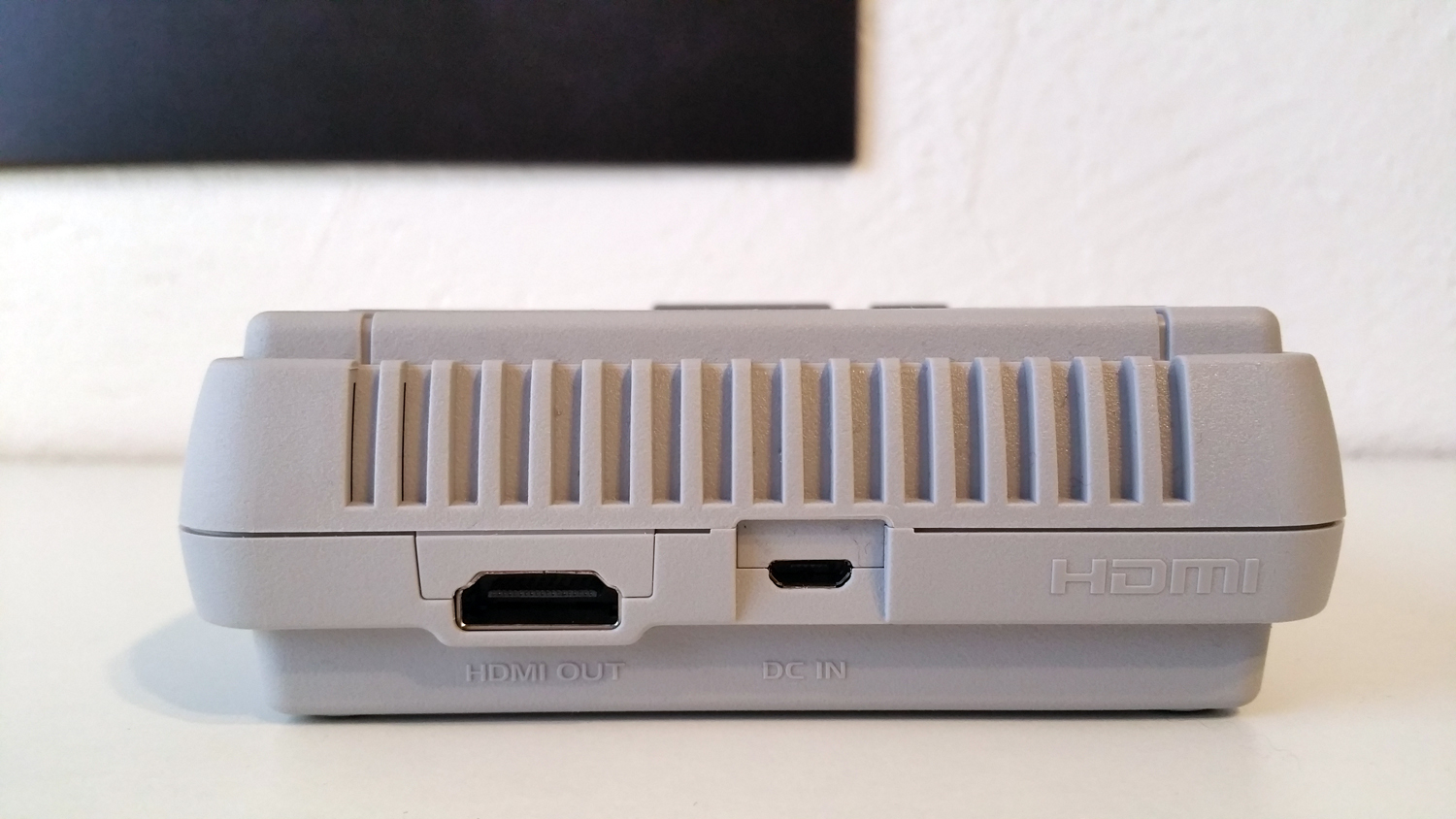
Back side

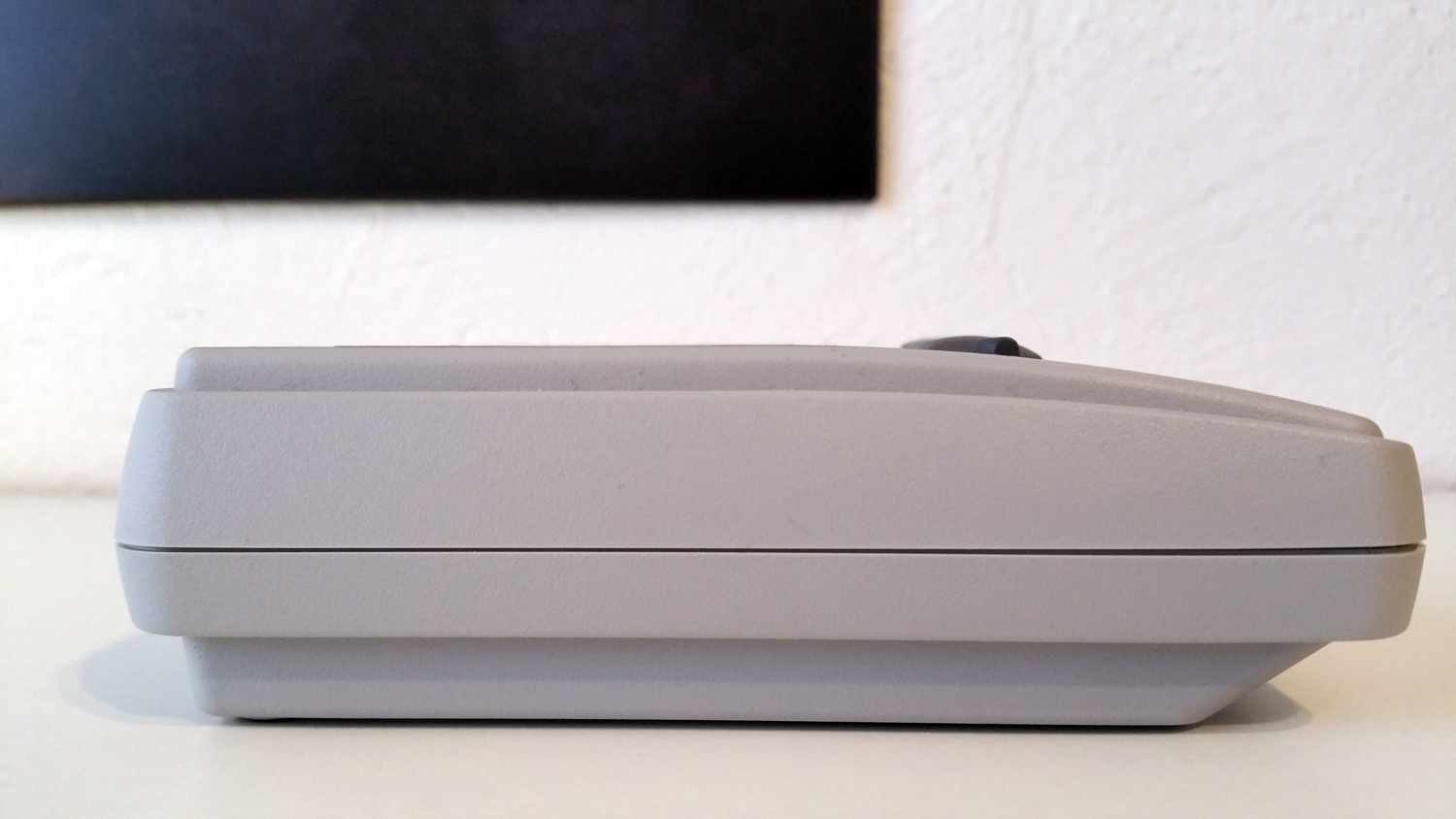
Right side

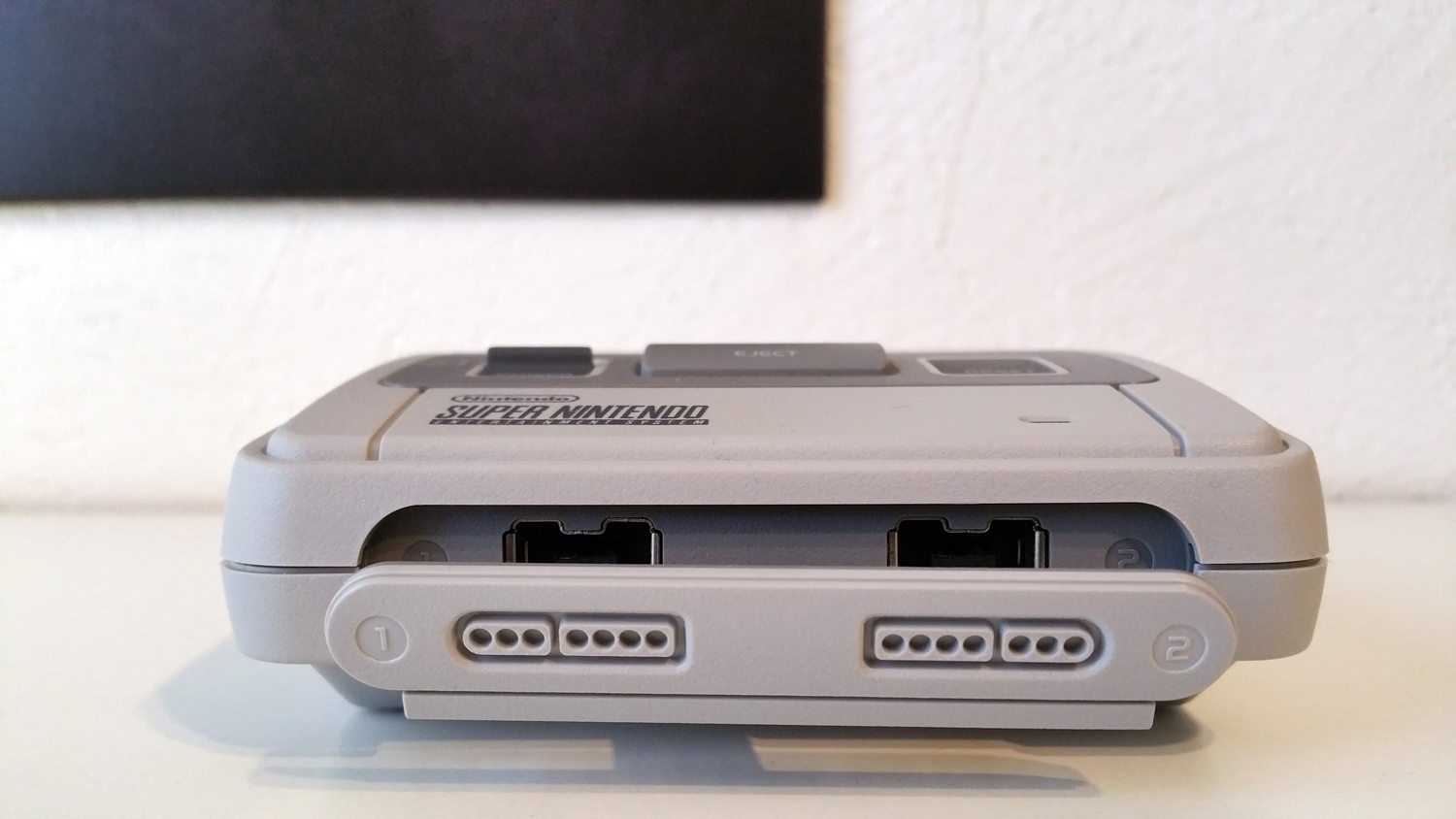
Opened front side

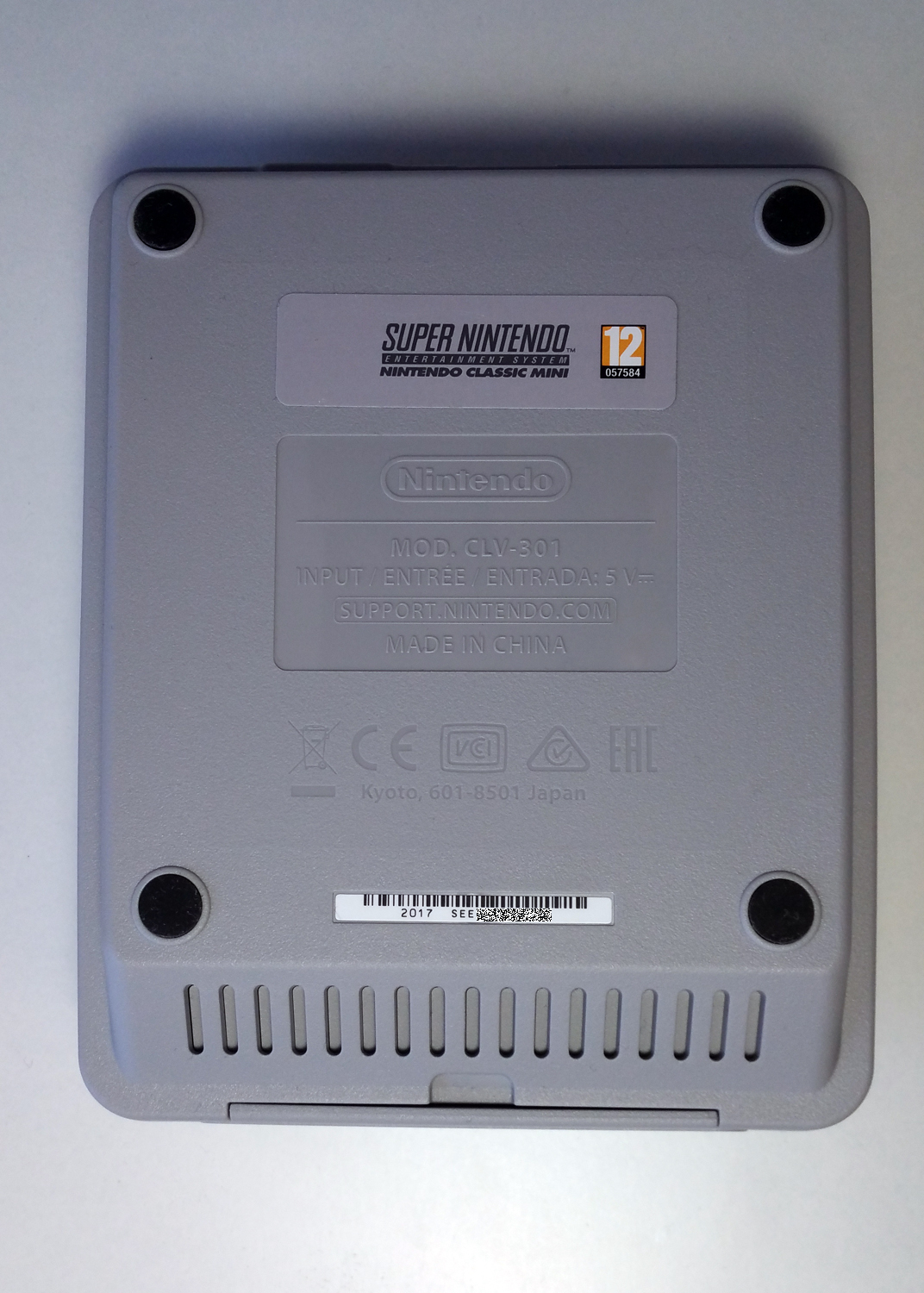
Bottom side

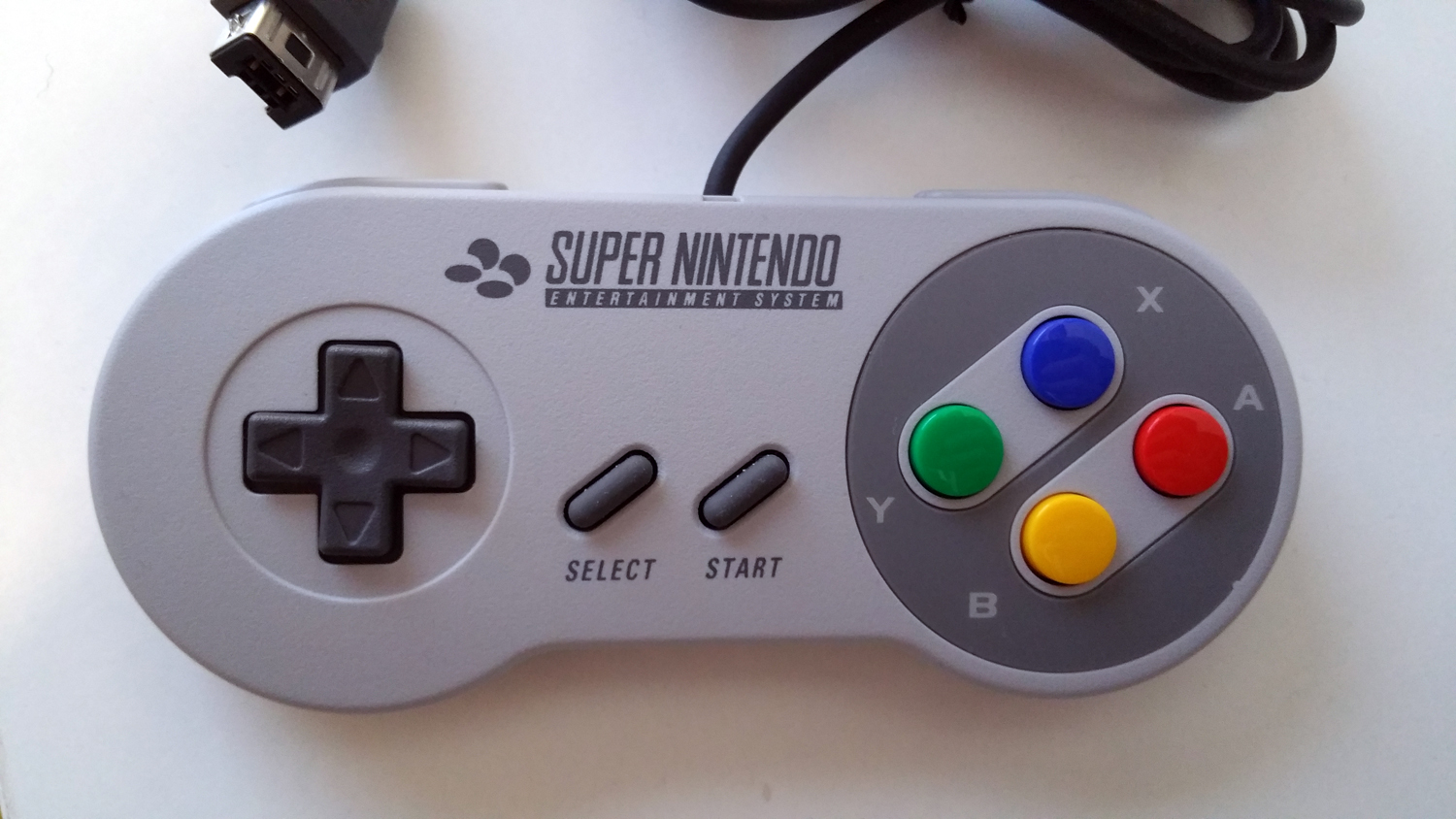
Front side of the controller

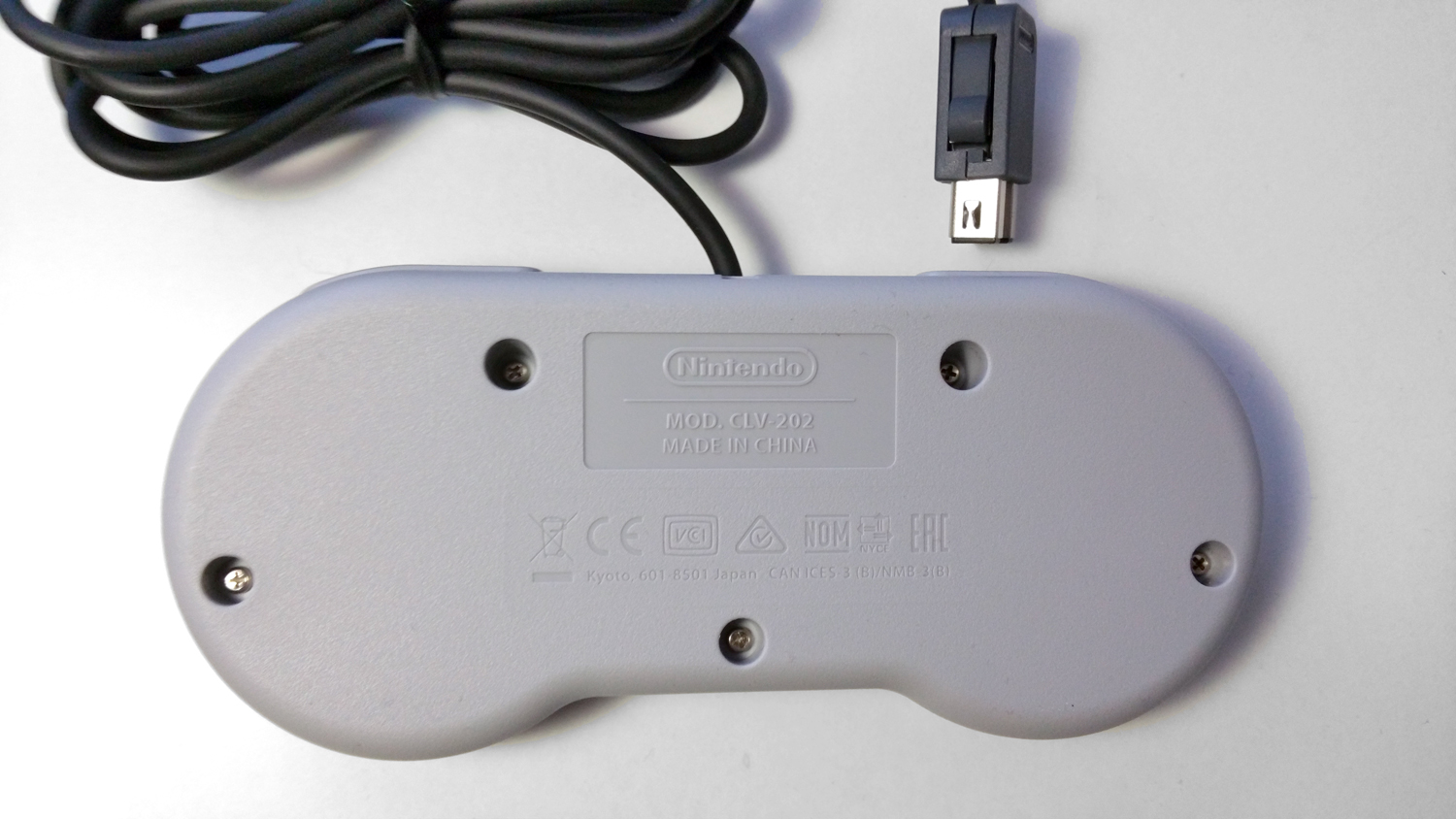
Back side of the controller

== Future ==
According to Nintendo, there were no plans for a Nintendo 64 Classic Mini. Doug Bowser, President of Nintendo of America from 2019 until 2025, said in 2019 that "Our focus right now is absolutely on our dedicated platforms such as Nintendo Switch Lite and our flagship Nintendo Switch." In 2018, Reggie Fils-Aimé said: "For us, these were limited time opportunities that were a way for us as a business to bridge from the conclusion of Wii U as a hardware system to the launch of Nintendo Switch. That was the very strategic reason we launched the NES Classic system."

== Literature ==
- Andreas Zintzsch: Nintendo Classic Mini SNES: Cheats, Tipps und Tricks. Bildner Verlag, Passau 2018, ISBN 978-3-8328-0300-1.
