= Captain Tsubasa 3: Koutei no Chousen =

1992 video game

Captain Tsubasa III: Koutei no Chousen
- Cover art of Captain Tsubasa 3: Koutei no Chousen
- Developer: Tecmo
- Publisher: Tecmo
- Composers: Kaori Nakabai; Rika Shigeno
- Platform: Super Famicom
- Release: JP: July 17, 1992
- Genre: Traditional soccer simulation
- Modes: Single-player, multiplayer

Captain Tsubasa III: The Kaiser's Challenge (キャプテン翼III —皇帝の挑戦—) is a video game exclusively released in Japan in 1992 by Tecmo for the Super Nintendo Entertainment System. It represents enhanced graphics compared to the two previous Family Computer video games and includes new features like unique rival tactics, increased use of scripted match scenarios, and alternation between different teams in different championships.
