= Kurosawa (disambiguation) =

Akira Kurosawa (1910–1998) was a Japanese film director and screenwriter.

Kurosawa may also refer to:

- Kurosawa (crater), an impact crater on Mercury
- Kurosawa (surname), a Japanese surname
- Kurosawa Film Studio, a Japanese film studio
- 254749 Kurosawa, a main-belt asteroid
- Kiyoshi Kurosawa, a Japanese film director and screenwriter

== See also ==
- Kurosawa Station (disambiguation), multiple railway stations in Japan
