= Spirit Camera =

2012 video game

Spirit Camera: The Cursed Memoir
- North American cover art
- Developer: Tecmo Koei Games
- Publisher: Nintendo
- Director: Manabu Nagasaki
- Producers: Keisuke Kikuchi; Kozo Makino; Toshiharu Izuno; Toru Osawa
- Designers: Hiroyuki Aoyagi; Makoto Kikuchi; Nozomu Yamagishi
- Writers: Tsuyoshi Iuchi; Masayuki Nagamine
- Composer: Ayako Toyoda
- Series: Fatal Frame
- Platform: Nintendo 3DS
- Release: JP: January 12, 2012; NA: April 13, 2012; EU: June 29, 2012
- Genre: Survival horror
- Mode: Single-player

Spirit Camera: The Cursed Memoir (Note: Japanese: 心霊カメラ 〜憑いてる手帳〜, Hepburn: Shinrei Camera ~Tsuiteru Techou~; lit. Spirit Camera: The Possessed Notebook) is a 2012 survival horror video game developed by Tecmo Koei Games and published by Nintendo for the Nintendo 3DS as a spin-off of the Fatal Frame series. Following the player as they investigate a diary which steals readers' faces, the gameplay focuses on the player using the 3DS's camera and augmented reality (AR) functions to solve puzzles, with the 3DS becoming the recurring Camera Obscura to fight hostile ghosts.

Series co-creator Keisuke Kikuchi led development on the title with a team of series veterans, as both Kikuchi and Nintendo staff felt the 3DS would be a good platform for a horror experience. Originally planned as the port of an earlier Fatal Frame, it was reworked into an original title with a theme of alternating between real and spirit worlds similar to Fatal Frame III: The Tormented (2005). Reception from journalists was mixed to negative, with its lack of content and issues with its AR elements frequently highlighted.

== Gameplay ==
A combat encounter in Spirit Camera

Spirit Camera: The Cursed Memoir is a survival horror in which players take on the role of an unnamed protagonist exploring the cursed "Diary of Faces". Gameplay relies on the Nintendo 3DS's camera and augmented reality (AR) functions, with an enclosed booklet being necessary to play. The game modes are split between the story mode with an unlockable harder difficulty, and two different sets of minigames based on either finding ghosts in the booklet, fighting story battles, or using the AR functions to take photos which generate a random ghost. The top screen shows the immediate or in-game environment, and the bottom screen shows in-game hints.

During gameplay, the 3DS functions as the Fatal Frame series' recurring Camera Obscura, with different color-coded lenses used for puzzle solving, finding spirits, and fighting hostile ghosts. These puzzles are introduced by the in-game character Maya, who also drives the main plot. Combat has the player facing ghosts that can appear in the real environment through the AR function: the ghost's health is displayed on the top screen, and a gem displays its location. The player must keep the ghost in focus, charging up the camera's power to deliver damage. Higher damage is dealt if the shot is taken during an attack. If the player takes a shot when the ghosts hits, they will block the attack. Clearing the story unlocks a harder mode, with clearing this unlocking costumes for Maya.

== Synopsis ==
The protagonist receives the "Diary of Faces", a cursed book that steals the faces of those who read from it. After falling victim to the curse, the protagonist uses a Camera Obscura to enter an ancient shrine contained within the book. There they encounter Maya, a friendly amnesiac spirit who warns that the shrine houses the Woman in Black, a hostile ghost responsible for the curse. To access the Woman in Black and lift the curse, the protagonists confronts ghosts trapped within the Diary of Faces, gradually revealing Maya's memories and backstory.

The protagonist learns that Maya was a shrine maiden chosen for a brutal ritual where she would have her eyes and mouth sewn shut and become a host for the gods. The Diary of Faces was given to her to record her thoughts. When the ritual was performed, Maya's attachment to the world caused the gods to abandon her, and her soul split in two; the Woman in Black is Maya's memories and darkness. Confronting the Woman in Black, the protagonist defeats her, allowing Maya to reunite with her and dispel the curse. The spirits are released, and the protagonist is sent a final message of thanks.

== Development and release ==
The concept for Spirit Camera was created by series co-creator Keisuke Kikuchi after Nintendo presented the 3DS to Tecmo Koei Games. Toshiharu Izuno, who had worked with Kikuchi on Fatal Frame: Mask of the Lunar Eclipse (2008), saw the potential for creating a horror game with the 3DS. The original pitch was porting an earlier Fatal Frame to the 3DS, but this was vetoed by then-president Satoru Iwata who wanted something more original. When considering creating new ways of frightening people, the team decided to make an original title built around the 3DS's camera and AR functions.

Kikuchi and Izuno worked as co-producers with Kozo Makino, who also created the AR book and was a self-described "on the ground" contact between Nintendo and Tecmo Koei. The scenario was co-written by Tsuyoshi Iuchi and Masayuki Nagamine; Iuchi had previously scripted the first three Fatal Frame titles. The series title was not used so as to broaden the game's potential audience. Kikuchi originally wanted to call the game Dr Asou's Spirit Camera, referencing the Camera Obscura's creator, but felt the reference was too obscure for most players. Izuno came up with the final title as a reference to the game's content.

The concept was for a horror experience alternating between reality and a dream-like world, which Kikuchi directly compared to Fatal Frame III: The Tormented (2005). The early plan was for everyday objects to act as triggers for the game's AR events, but this proved unworkable and the AR booklet was created instead. Kikuchi was worried about the cost, but after Nintendo suggested it independently, he agreed. The basic gameplay was kept similar to the main series, but Kikuchi described the game's structure as "totally changed".

Spirit Camera was announced in August 2011. It has been described by both journalists and officially as a spin-off. It released across all regions in 2012 by Nintendo. The game was released on January 12 in Japan, on April 13 in North America, and on June 29 in Europe alongside the Wii remake of Fatal Frame II: Crimson Butterfly. In Japan, a six-part supplementary story dubbed "Another Story" was published in six parts on the game's website, and a live action short was released online.

== Reception ==
Reception

Aggregate score
Aggregator	Score
Metacritic	54/100

Review scores
Publication	Score
1Up.com	C−
Destructoid	1/10
Famitsu	35/40
Game Informer	5/10
GamesRadar+	2.5/5
IGN	5.5/10
Nintendo Life	3/10
Nintendo World Report	4/10
Official Nintendo Magazine	58%
Pocket Gamer	2.5/5
VentureBeat	59/100

During its first week in Japan, Spirit Camera sold over 16,300 units. It had a sell-through rate of over 74%, indicating that it sold out in many stores. By the end of 2012, the game had sold over 39,400 units. Spirit Camera saw a "mixed or average" reception from critics, with review aggregation website Metacritic giving it a score of 54 out of 100 based on 35 reviews. The concept behind the game saw positive acknowledgement, though the necessity of playing the game in a well-lit area to ensure the AR booklet worked properly was a recurring complaint.

Japanese game magazine Famitsu praised the implementation of AR into its horror and recurring Fatal Frame mechanics, and felt the story's shortness worked within its limited scale. Audrey Drake of IGN described the game's use of the 3DS hardware as "innovative" and praised the audio design, but disliked the controls and faulted its short length. 1Up.com's Bob Mackey enjoyed the combat for its implementation and creepy elements, and praised the AR-based puzzles, but found the overall experience too shallow for prolonged enjoyment. VentureBeat's D. F. Smith positively noted the story, and felt the strong gameplay concepts were let down with poor technology and the game was overpriced for the amount of content offered. Bryan Vore of Game Informer praised the boss encounters and puzzles, but noted a large number of technical issues and hardware limitations undermined the game's potential.

Tom Worthington of Pocket Gamer praised the use of AR in its puzzles, but otherwise disliked its gameplay design necessitating constant movement from the player. Fran Paccio of GamesRadar called the short length "both a curse and a blessing", feeling that the lack of content or gameplay variety undermined the game's potential. Chris Scullion, writing for Official Nintendo Magazine, faulted the short length once again, and noted that the requirement for an AR booklet meant it was unlikely to release digitally at a more reasonable price for its content. Zachary Miller of Nintendo World Report felt the ghost fights were the best part of the game, otherwise finding its puzzle design awkward or frustrating and calling its story "predictable J-horror fare". Nintendo Life's Philip J. Reed praised the concept and premise of the game, but was otherwise critical of its narrative and gameplay elements, additionally faulting frequent technical issues with the 3DS camera. James Stephanie Sterling of Destructoid was highly negative, conceding the idea behind the game was sound, but otherwise found its visuals and gameplay lacking depth or polish.
