= Yoshitatsu =

Yoshitatsu may refer to:

- Yoshi Tatsu/Yoshitatsu, the ring names of professional wrestler Naofumi Yamamoto
- Yoshitatsu Kiryu, a fictional dollmaker
