= FF2 =

FF2 may refer to:

- Final Fantasy II, a 1988 console role-playing game for the Family Computer
- Final Fantasy IV, retitled Final Fantasy II in North America, a 1991 console role-playing game for the Super NES
- Fatal Fury 2, a 1992 competitive fighting game for the Neo-Geo
- Fatal Frame II, a 2003 survival horror game for the PlayStation 2 and Xbox
- Final Fight 2, a 1993 side-scrolling action game for the Super NES
- Fantastic Four: Rise of the Silver Surfer, the sequel to the 2005 Fantastic Four film
- 2 Fast 2 Furious, a 2003 film
- Mozilla Firefox 2, a web browser released in 2006
- Freak Fortress 2, a game mode/mini-community for the game, "Team Fortress 2"

== See also ==
- FFII (disambiguation)
