= Kurosawa (surname) =

Kurosawa (written: 黒沢 or 黒澤 lit. "black swamp") is a Japanese surname. Notable people with the surname include:

- Akira Kurosawa (1910–1998), Japanese filmmaker and painter
- Asuka Kurosawa (born 1971), actress and model
- Haruki Kurosawa (born 1977), Japanese racing driver
- Kazuko Kurosawa (born 1954), costume designer and daughter of Akira
- Kenichi Kurosawa (1968–2016), Japanese musician and record producer
- Kinko Kurosawa (1710–1771), komusō and music collector
- Kowloon Kurosawa (born 1971), essayist and nonfiction writer
- Kiyoshi Kurosawa (born 1955), film director
- Manabu Nakanishi (born 1967), Japanese professional wrestler who temporarily wrestled as Kurosawa
- Mirena Kurosawa (born 2001), tarento and idol
- Motoharu Kurosawa (born 1940), racing driver and father to racing drivers Haruki, Tsubasa, and Takuya
- Takuya Kurosawa (born 1962), racing driver, son of Motoharu Kurosawa
- Paulo Kurosawa, producer of MNL48 and president of Hallo Hallo Entertainment
- Tomoyo Kurosawa (born 1996), Japanese actress and singer

== Fictional characters ==
- Jun Kurosawa, a rival character in the racing game Tokyo Xtreme Racer: Drift 2
- Minamo Kurosawa, a character in the manga series Azumanga Daioh
- Kurosawa Hiroharu, a character in the anime series Sky Girls
- Ryokan Kurosawa and his twin daughters Yae and Sae, characters in the video game Fatal Frame
- Dia and Ruby Kurosawa, characters in the multimedia project Love Live! Sunshine!!
- Takashi Kurosawa, a character in the film The Hitman's Bodyguard
