= FF5 =

FF5 may refer to:

- Family Force 5, a band now known by the name FF5
- Fast & Furious 5, a 2011 film
- Fatal Frame: Maiden of Black Water, a 2014 survival horror game for the Wii U
- Final Fantasy V, a 1992 role-playing game for the Super Famicom
- Mozilla Firefox 5, a web browser
