= Fatal Frame (video game) =

2001 video game

- North American PlayStation 2 cover art
- Developer: Tecmo
- Publishers: JP/NA: Tecmo; EU: Wanadoo Edition (PS2); EU: Microsoft Game Studios (Xbox)
- Director: Makoto Shibata
- Producer: Keisuke Kikuchi
- Programmer: Toshiyuki Takasaki
- Artist: Hitoshi Hasegawa
- Writers: Makoto Shibata; Tsuyoshi Iuchi
- Composers: Shigekiyo Okuda; Ayako Toyoda
- Series: Fatal Frame
- Platforms: PlayStation 2; Xbox
- Release: PlayStation 2: JP: December 13, 2001; NA: February 27, 2002; EU: August 30, 2002; Xbox: NA: November 27, 2002; JP: February 6, 2003; EU: May 2, 2003
- Genre: Survival horror
- Mode: Single-player

Fatal Frame (Note: Known in Japan as Zero (Japanese: 零(ゼロ) 〜zero〜) and in Europe as Project Zero) is a survival horror video game developed by Tecmo for PlayStation 2. The first entry in the Fatal Frame series, it was published by Tecmo in Japan (2001) and North America (2002), and by Wanadoo Edition in Europe in 2002. An expanded Xbox port was published by Tecmo in 2002 in North America (2002) and Japan (2003), and by Microsoft Game Studios in Europe in 2003. The story follows Miku Hinasaki, a spiritually-sensitive girl exploring the haunted Himuro Mansion in search of her brother Mafuyu. Gameplay follows Miku as she explores the Mansion, solving puzzles and fighting hostile ghosts using a mystical camera.

Development began after the PlayStation 2 hardware was introduced to Tecmo. The concept was created by Makoto Shibata, who acted as director. He and producer Keisuke Kikuchi wanted to create the scariest gaming experience possible. Its atmosphere was inspired by Japanese horror and war movies, although some parts were cut due to graphic content. In North America, the game was marketed as being based on a true story. The game received generally positive reviews for its atmosphere and main gameplay mechanic, while the port drew praise for its improved visuals. A sequel, Fatal Frame II: Crimson Butterfly, was released in 2003.

== Gameplay ==
A battle with a hostile ghost, with the main character viewing it through the Camera Obscura. Miku's health, the camera ammunition, and ghost indicator are shown.

Fatal Frame is a survival horror video game set within an abandoned Japanese mansion, divided into a prologue tutorial and four chapters. The player controls Miku Hinasaki for the majority of the game, with the prologue featuring Miku's brother Mafuyu. Each part of the mansion includes a map of its layout, and each level is rendered in real-time instead of using pre-rendered backgrounds. During navigation, players guide the characters through multiple rooms, each with a semi-fixed camera perspective that changes depending on a character's position. Environments are invariably dark, with exploration being possible through the use of a flashlight. During exploration, various items can be found scattered through environments: these include documents and cassette recordings expanding on elements of the story, health items, and other objects. In some areas, the main character must also solve puzzles to progress. Progress is saved at savepoints through the mansion, and at the end of each chapter.

Hostile ghosts can only be fought using the Camera Obscura, an antique camera that can capture ghosts. Ghosts in environments are sensed using a character's "sixth sense", and will drain a character's health on contact. When using the Camera, the view switches to a first-person view: the Camera Obscura's viewpoint is moved with the left analog stick on a controller, while the character is moved with the right stick while maintaining a view through the Camera. Holding a ghost in view enables greater damage, but ghosts fade in and out of view as they approach. The most damage is dealt when the ghost is very close. The amount of damage taken is converted into points, which are used to upgrade the camera for faster reload time or greater damage with each shot, or adding secondary powers such as staggering ghosts when shooting them. Points are also gained by photographing benign ghosts that appear in set spots around the mansion. Film, the Camera's ammunition, can be found throughout the mansion or be replenished at a save point: it comes in various grades (Type-14, Type-37, Type-74, Type-90) with higher-quality grades (Type-74, Type-90) dealing higher damage while consequently being rarer.

== Synopsis ==
The story, set in the year 1986, focuses on orphaned siblings Miku and Mafuyu Hinasaki, who share the ability to sense and perceive supernatural events. When Mafuyu disappears in the haunted Himuro Mansion searching for his tutor Junsei Takamine and his assistants, Miku goes to Himuro Mansion. As she explores the mansion, Miku discovers signs that Takamine's party were killed by the mansion's ghosts, and finds rope burns appearing on her wrists and ankles, manifestations of a curse on anyone who enters Himuro Mansion. Further exploration through the mansion turns up information on a dark ritual that took place within Himuro Mansion: a chosen "Rope Shrine Maiden" was torn apart using ropes attached to her limbs and neck, then the ropes that killed her were soaked in her blood and used to seal the Hell Gate, a portal to the afterlife that keeps a dark force known as "the Malice" and the restless dead from escaping into the living world.

The last sacrifice, Kirie Himuro, fell in love with a visitor prior to her death; while the Himuro family head had the man killed in secret, Kirie remained attached to the mortal world through her love for him. This attachment meant that her sacrifice did not seal the Hell Gate, allowing Malice to infest Himuro Mansion, with its inhabitants either dying or being driven mad. Kirie's spirit haunts the mansion in a splintered form; a child version who helps Miku at various points, and an adult version corrupted by Malice responsible for the curse which kills visitors. Mafuyu was captured by Kirie as he resembles her dead lover.

Miku finally confronts Kirie's adult form at the Hell Gate, cleansing her spirit of Malice using an artifact called the Holy Mirror. With her spirit reformed, Kirie willingly becomes the Rope Shrine Maiden and uses her body to seal the Hell Gate permanently, freeing the spirits trapped in Himuro Mansion. The ending then diverges depending on the game's difficulty. In the "Normal Mode" ending, Mafuyu stays behind with Kirie to keep her spirit company while Miku escapes the Hell Gate's chamber as it collapses. (Note: Treated as the canon ending in Fatal Frame III: The Tormented) In the "Hard Mode" ending, Kirie convinces Mafuyu to escape with his sister. A third ending, exclusive to the Xbox version, shows the spirit of Kirie's lover returning to her while Miku and Mafuyu escape.

== Development ==
The concept for the game came to future director Makoto Shibata shortly after he finished work on Tecmo's Deception: Invitation to Darkness. The concept came to Shibata inspired by his own dreams and encounters with what he felt were supernatural occurrences. Development began when the PlayStation 2 hardware was first introduced to Tecmo, under the codename "Project Zero". One of the things they drew inspiration from was the positive reception of polygon characters in the Silent Hill series, using this to go a step further and create the sense of seeing things off-screen. The ultimate goal was to create as frightening an atmosphere as possible. The staff included multiple developers from the Deception series. According to character designer and CGI director Hitoshi Hasegawa, the game's key colors are black and white: white represented hope, while black represented fear. During early development, a large amount of effort went into adjusting the lighting and shading, with the most obvious in-game representation of the key colors and desired effect being Miku's torch piercing the darkness inside the mansion. In addition to black and white, a third key color represented through Miku's clothing was red, representing life. The music was composed by a team which included Ayako Toyoda and sound director Shigekiyo Okuda. One of the early decisions was using stereophonic sound to reinforce the atmosphere. Due to the nature of the project, Okuda considered it important that they convey a three-dimensional feeling using sound projected from both left and right. After testing out multiple middleware and commercial sound tools, the team settled on Arnis Sound Technologies.

The setting of the game in a classical Japanese mansion originated from Shibata's early ideas for settings within the Deception series, although these ideas were passed over as it limited the possibilities for the series' trap-setting gameplay. When creating the atmosphere, the team watched both high and low-budget Japanese horror films, and war films. Kikuchi described Shibata as writing the entire story by himself. The script was written by Tsuyoshi Iuchi. The story was the first part of the game to be completed. The setting was originally going to be in the then-present day, but as the team wanted to create a feeling of isolation through a lack of modern technology such as mobile phones, the setting was changed to the 1980s. Some scenes were considered too graphic for the game and were cut: two cited examples were a flashback showing the head of the Himuro house committing seppuku, and another was a scene showing Kirie being torn apart during the Strangling Ritual. The way the Holy Mirror was broken also made a deliberate reference to how the ritual pulled the body into five pieces. While rituals form a core part of the story, the development team had little to no experience with such things. For inspiration, Shibata used similar motifs of spirituality in Yōkai Hunter, a manga written by Daijiro Morohoshi. The Camera Obscura was not in the initial discussions between Shibata and Kikuchi, with the original idea being that ghosts would be avoided and repelled by light. Ultimately, they decided to have a type of offensive power, which resulted in the Camera's creation. Kikuchi was initially opposed to the idea, but saw that it fitted very well into the game's context as development progressed. The Camera's design was based on a German military camera.

== Release ==
The game was first announced in July 2001 for a winter release under the provisional title "Project Zero". The game's Japanese title was inspired by the nature of the game's enemies as "beings of nothingness", along with it representing the state of someone being at their utmost during a decisive moment. It could also be read alternately as "zero" and "ghost". The game was initially dated for December 7, but Tecmo later shifted the date forward to December 13. As part of the promotion campaign, two special giveaways were created and sold through Japanese media store Tsutaya: headphones given away to winners of a lottery, and a trial version available to rent. In addition to this, a novelization written from the point of view of Mafuyu was published by ASCII Media Works.

The game's release for North America was confirmed in January 2002 to be March 8, but the title was instead made available on February 27. The title was marketed in North America as being based on a true story. While this was not true in itself, elements of the story were based on real haunted locations and local Japanese legends. Two cited examples were a haunted mansion said to be the site of numerous murders, and the legend of a tree from which a woman hanged herself when forcefully separated from her lover. In Europe, it was published as Project Zero by Wanadoo, a publishing company based in France. Wanadoo had their eye on the game since its Japanese release, and took charge of its translation and promotion for the region. It was released on the region on August 30, 2002.

An expanded port for the Xbox, titled Fatal Frame Special Edition, was released on November 27, 2002 in North America, February 6, 2003 in Japan, and May 2, 2003 in Europe. The Japanese release used the game's American title as opposed to its Japanese title. Tecmo published the port in Japan and North America, while the game was published by Microsoft Game Studios in Europe. The port featured graphical upgrades, new ghosts to fight, a redesigned interface for the camera, bonus costumes for Miku, and a new "Fatal" difficulty mode. Completing the game on this difficulty unlocked an art gallery. The game was re-released on the PlayStation Network for the PlayStation 3 in North America on April 9, 2013 as a PlayStation 2 Classic.

== Reception ==
Reception

Aggregate score
Aggregator	Score	
Aggregator	PS2	Xbox
Metacritic	74/100 (22 reviews)	77/100 (17 reviews)

Review scores
Publication	Score	
Publication	PS2	Xbox
1Up.com	B+	
Eurogamer	9/10	8/10
Famitsu	32/40	
GamePro	3.5/5	3/5
GameRevolution	B+	B+
GameSpot	7.1/10	7.7/10
GameSpy		4.5/5
IGN	7.9/10	7.7/10

During 2001, Fatal Frame sold just over 42,000 units in Japan, ranking among the top 300 best-selling games of that year. Upon its release in Europe, the PS2 version sold 12,000 copies. According to an interview with Kikuchi and Shibata, the game was an unexpected success in both North America and Europe. The two attributed this to the recent popularity of Japanese horror films like Ring.

The PS2 version met with "mixed or average" reviews according to review aggregation website Metacritic, earning a score of 74 out of 100 based on 22 critic reviews. Famitsu praised the use of the Camera Obscura in creating a sense of tension in combination with the sound and visual design. IGN's David Smith, while noting some difficulties with the controls, generally praised its atmosphere and gameplay, saying that "horror fans are advised to pick this one up at their leisure, and even the jaded might find something to renew their interest in the genre". Chris Baker of 1UP.com similarly praised the atmosphere and enjoyed the gameplay, particularly noting its ability to make him feel like a newcomer to gaming with its late-game difficulty spike.

GameSpot's Miguel Lopez was generally positive, enjoying the game despite faulting some of the textures and particle effects: in conclusion, he said that fans of the Resident Evil and Silent Hill series would enjoy the game. Rob Fahey of Eurogamer, while initially wary of the game, was impressed by the game, calling it "compelling and utterly addictive" and citing multiple parallels with Ring. GamePro was less enthusiastic, saying that it did not hold up well alongside games like Silent Hill. Chris Hudak of Game Revolution gave strong praise to the game's atmosphere, but faulted the Camera Obscura's need for ghosts to be within the targeting area to score points, and some over-familiar elements similar to other horror games of the time.

The Xbox version saw a more positive reception, with Metacritic giving a score of 77 out of 100 based on seventeen reviews. GameSpy's Raina Lee, reviewing the Xbox version, called it "the only really scary game" on the console at the time. Lee was particularly positive about the improvements despite them not being substantial when compared to other expanded re-releases of the time, recommending it to players who had yet to try the original version. IGN's Aaron Boulding likewise noted the graphical upgrade, while saying that players of the original version would find little to attract them again aside from the new difficulty mode. Eurogamer's Kristan Reed, echoing Fahey's sentiments about the game, called it one of the best games on the Xbox, positively noting the added features and graphical upgrade. GamePro, while again faulting it when compared to other horror games, was generally positive about the upgrade, calling it "a solid choice for horror fanatics, especially considering that genre offerings on the Xbox are few and far between". Ricardo Torres of GameSpot was less enthusiastic about the graphical upgrade, but praised the improved sound quality and called it a sound game in the genre.

== Legacy ==
The success of Fatal Frame prompted Tecmo to turn the concept into a series. Since the original game's release, the gameplay has remained generally unchanged, becoming a defining part of the series' identity. A standalone sequel, Fatal Frame II: Crimson Butterfly, was released in 2003 in Japan and North America, and 2004 in Europe. A further sequel, Fatal Frame III: The Tormented, was released in 2005 in Japan and North America and 2006 in Europe. The first three Fatal Frame titles form a loosely-connected trilogy, with The Tormented continuing narrative elements from the first two titles.

Shortly after the game's release, a Hollywood film adaptation was announced in 2003. Based on the game's story and intended to be set in Japan as opposed to a Western country, Robert Fyvolent and Mark R. Brinker were to be the writers and John Rogers was the producer. Steven Spielberg has been brought in to polish the script. After a long period of hiatus, the film was re-announced in 2014, this time produced by Samuel Hadida, and was set to begin production after the completion and release of the fifth Fatal Frame title Maiden of Black Water. A Japanese film adaptation was released in September 2014.
