= Pandora's Tower =

2011 action role-playing game

- European cover art
- Developer: Ganbarion
- Publishers: WW: Nintendo; NA: Xseed Games
- Directors: Toru Hoga; Takao Nakano
- Producers: Chikako Yamakura; Hitoshi Yamagami
- Designers: Tsuyoshi Sato; Hirofumi Tsurumoto
- Programmer: Minoru Sudo
- Artist: Go Takeuchi
- Composer: Takayuki Kobara
- Platform: Wii
- Release: JP: 26 May 2011; AU: 12 April 2012; EU: 13 April 2012; NA: 16 April 2013
- Genre: Action role-playing
- Mode: Single-player

Pandora's Tower (Note: Japanese: パンドラの塔 君のもとへ帰るまで, Hepburn: Pandora no Tō: Kimi no Moto e Kaeru Made lit. Pandora's Tower: Until I Return to Your Side) is an action role-playing game developed by Ganbarion and published by Nintendo for the Wii. The game was released in Japan in May 2011, in PAL territories in April 2012 and in North America by Xseed Games in April 2013. Focusing on the efforts of protagonist Aeron to rid his love Elena of a curse that is turning her into a monster, the player explores thirteen towers, solving environmental puzzles and taking part in platforming while battling enemies—a key part of gameplay is the Oraclos Chain, a weapon that aids in both combat and navigation. Depending on the strength of Aeron's relationship with Elena, multiple endings can be reached.

Development began in 2006 following the completion of Jump Ultimate Stars as Ganbarion's first original title. The main concept was born from the desire to create a game scenario based around purification and love. Character numbers and plot twists were kept to a minimum to focus attention on Elena's plight. Due to recurring problems implementing the relationship mechanics and working with the Wii's controls, Pandora's Tower went through an extended development period. Despite releasing in Europe, Nintendo did not announce a plan for a North American release. Xseed Games would later pick up the title for a release in that region. Pandora's Tower had modest commercial success and was met with mixed to positive reviews; praise went to the story and elements of combat, while the graphics and character development were faulted.

== Gameplay ==
Main character Aeron solving a puzzle inside one of the Thirteen Towers

Pandora's Tower is an action role-playing game where players take the role of Aeron as he explores a fortress called the Thirteen Towers, suspended above a ravine known as the Scar, on a quest to cure his lover Elena of a curse. Aeron can be controlled through both the Wii Remote and Nunchuk or the Classic Controller. The base from which Aeron explores the Thirteen Towers is the Observatory, a building on the edge of the Scar. In the Observatory, Aeron can save his progress, and interact with Elena and the merchant Mavda. The main objective when inside the Thirteen Towers is the reach the Masters, powerful monsters housed at the top of each tower in a locked room which act as the game's bosses. These rooms must be accessed by solving puzzles throughout each Tower to unlock the door. On his way through the Towers, Aeron must fight numerous smaller enemies: he can perform a basic melee attack, and a charged attack which deals higher damage and will trigger additional attacks if the player times a button press with the appearance of a targeting ring around Aeron.

Aeron's main weapon is the Oraclos Chain, an artifact that can be used in multiple ways: it can tie up enemies, bind enemies together so they share damage taken when Aeron attacks, and swing them around Aeron to deal damage. The Chain can also be used to rip armor or materials from enemies. The Chain's attack power increases the longer it is pulled when attached to an enemy. In addition to the Oraclos Chain, Aeron has access to multiple subweapons, such as a sword. Puzzles within the Towers include activating levers and switches, manipulating platforms, triggering special mechanisms unique to each Tower environment, and climbing along walls and beams to reach other areas within the Towers. The Chain is essential to these puzzles, being used as a grappling hook and a rope from which Aeron can swing from one platform to another. Elements within the Towers, such as what enemies are active and what items may be found, vary with the time of day Aeron visits them.

While Aeron is within the Towers, a time counter is displayed, showing the advancement of Elena's curse. As Aeron defeats both normal enemies and the Masters of each Tower, he gathers flesh from them which he must give to Elena to eat and reverse the curse's effects, resetting the timer: the amount of reversion is dependent on the quality of flesh, which deteriorates over time after being extracted. Elena's state is also tied to the Affinity gauge; giving her flesh, talking with her, giving her gifts and asking her to help with tasks raise the meter, but delaying reverting Elena's transformation causes it to decrease. The strength of Aeron's relationship with Elena directly impacts the game's ending. Items and equipment are created and stored in the Observatory, with Mavda using materials brought back from the Towers to create new equipment for Aeron. She can also repair equipment that has been damaged in combat while equipped to Aeron, and upgrade existing weapons and equipment with new materials. If the time limit is exceeded and Elena completes her transformation, or Aeron falls in battle, the game ends and restarts from the last active save.

== Synopsis ==
=== Setting and characters ===
Pandora's Tower is set on the fictional continent of Imperia: once divided into ten kingdoms, the now-nomadic Vestra tribe were stripped of their kingdom. The dominant religion of Imperia is Aios, a polytheistic system worshiping nature as personified by twelve deities. Though once united through the ancient War of Unification which began the Unified Era, Imperia has seen recent conflicts as three kingdoms sought to break free from the powerful kingdom of Elyria.

During the game's present, the war has ended but tensions are still high on both sides. The game's primary setting is the Okanos region at the Thirteen Towers, a giant fortress suspended above a giant chasm called the Scar, held in place by thirteen giant chains said to keep the Scar from growing. Initially built five centuries before, a disastrous magical experiment caused the Towers to be infested by monsters. Fifty years prior to the start of the game, a new experiment involving the monsters triggers the Scar's creation.

The main protagonist is Aeron, a former soldier from the kingdom of Athos. Three years prior to the start of the game, a wounded Aeron was given shelter by Elena, an Elyrian. Despite their countries being at war, Elena nurses him and the two eventually became lovers. They are accompanied on their journey to the Thirteen Towers by Mavda, a woman of the Vestra tribe who is the current guardian of the Towers. Her tribe have the ability to manipulate the chains of fate, and gives Aeron the Oraclos Chain weapon to both aid him in his quest and maintain a connection with Elena.

=== Plot ===
While singing at Elyria's Harvest Festival, Elena is struck by a curse that forces her to flee the Elyrian army with Aeron. They are led by Mavda to the Thirteen Towers, with Elena having been partially transformed into a monster by this point. Mavda reveals that the only way to lift the curse from Elena and prevent her transformation is to feed her the flesh of "Masters", powerful beings living inside the Towers. Given the Oraclos Chain, Aeron explores the Towers and kills each of its Masters, returning to give their flesh to Elena. Each time she eats Master Flesh, she receives visions detailing the events behind the Towers' creations. Five hundred years before, in an attempt to end the War of Unification, the people of Elyria and the Vestra decided to embody the twelve deities of Imperia in physical forms—the Towers' Masters—with a thirteenth vessel providing balance between them in a project dubbed Experiment Zero.

A husband and wife who had lost their son as a result of the war offered themselves as the raw material of the final Master, but the woman's unknown pregnancy caused an imbalance that transformed the Masters into monsters. The husband and baby were rescued using the Oraclos Chain, but the wife became Zeron, a dark monster consumed with a want to reunite with her descendant and bring 'peace' to the land. The Vestra sealed the Masters in the Towers and guarded them, while the wife's child eventually became Aeron's ancestor. The wife's jealous want of her descendants caused her to curse people who grew close to them, with Elena being the latest victim of the curse. The Vestra brought each afflicted person to the Towers in the hopes that the Masters would be destroyed and Experiment Zero ended: Mavda was the latest guardian of the Towers. Four hundred and fifty years later, the Elyrian Army recreated the Masters as living weapons: without the knowledge and help of the Vestra, the Elyrians instigated a drastic geological upheaval that created the Scar, which acted as a portal to the netherworld.

==== Endings ====
Depending on the players actions and the strength of Aeron's relationship with Elena, the game has six possible endings.

- If the counter runs out and Elena is consumed by the curse, Aeron returns to find her transformed into a monster, and allows himself to be killed by her. Leading an army of monsters, Elena unites Elyria under her rule. This scene is a "Game Over" scenario.
- Ending D: Broken Chain: Following the defeat of the Ninth Master, Elena attacks Aeron and then begins to transform, forcing him to kill her to put an end to her misery before she could complete her transformation. In the epilogue, it is revealed that the Thirteen Towers' curse continued, and that Elena and Aeron were forgotten.
- Ending C: Still Together: Returning after defeating the final two Masters, Aeron finds Elena in a monstrous form and is forced to fight her in a final boss battle. After defeating her and temporarily returning her to normal, they are then captured by the Elyrian army, who were led to them by Mavda. Mavda suggests using Elena's new powers, guided by her continued love for Aeron, to unite Imperia under Elyria's rule. The epilogue reveals that this did happen.
- Ending B: All For You: After eating all the Master Flesh, Elena becomes Zeron's host, and Aeron fights her on top of the Thirteen Towers. Despite returning to human form, Elena says Zeron is still inside her, and to end Experiment Zero she commits suicide by throwing herself into the Scar as Mavda closes it. This succeeds in cleansing the plague, but Aeron wonders if Elena could have still been saved.
- Ending A: Together Forever: Events play out as in Ending B, but Zeron explains that the Scar was created to stop Elyria from creating biological weapons. Despite Zeron's defeat, Elena is still cursed, and decides to end Experiment Zero. Aeron chooses to join her, and the two throw themselves into the Scar, using the chain to close it as they fall. The epilogue reveals that the land continued to be plagued by war, and that the Vestra passed down Aeron and Elena's tale as a legend.
- Ending S: Unbreakable Bond: Events proceed roughly as in Ending A, except that Elena is purged of the curse. Aeron must then destroy a monstrous Zeron, saving Elena one last time. The two then leave while Mavda uses the chain to destroy the Thirteen Towers, sacrificing herself to end their evils. In the epilogue, it is revealed that the kingdoms manage to end the War of Independence after the closing of the Scar, the Vestra are granted new lands to settle on by Elyria after Elyria's king receives a letter from Mavda detailing events at the Towers, and Aeron and Elena lived happily together.

== Development ==
The first stages of development began in late 2006 after the completion of Jump Ultimate Stars. Up to that point, developer Ganbarion had only ever worked on licensed titles, and the team wanted to do something original. When Nintendo asked whether they wished to work on an original intellectual property due to being impressed by their work, Ganbarion accepted and pitched them the idea. The initial concept was how something pure had been corrupted and needed to be purified once again, with the main theme being love. The concept of the heroine needing to eat meat did not come until much later, when producer Chikako Yamakura was talking with another staff member about the then-prevalent fashion for ekiben, boxed lunches served on trains, and the idea came to her "out of the blue". Only the basic elements of the story had been decided by then, and despite reservations by Nintendo's then-CEO Satoru Iwata, the project was greenlit as Iwata felt that they deserved the chance to work on a fresh project. The long development cycle was the result of continuous problems faced by the team which ran from the use of the Wii Remote to mixed responses from testers on the mechanics surrounding Elena which necessitated some aspects surrounding the character to be scrapped and redone from scratch. This latter measure needed to be undertaken just a year before the game's release. Despite this, the final game came out relatively close to their initial vision.

The game's title went through multiple revisions during development, with Nintendo producer Hitoshi Yamagami saying that he went through discussions with Yamakura about ten times and Yamakura stated that about five thousand titles had been suggested. The Japanese subtitle, "Until I Return To Your Side", was proposed and approved at a fairly early stage. The final title was only decided two months before the mastering process began. The Oraclos Chain was present in early concepts as a means of contrasting with Elena's feminine image, and was born as a gameplay device from discussions on how to best create an action-based experience with limited controls. Alongside this, the team wanted to make the game suitable for gamers not comfortable with action games, so upgrades and equipment repair were added. The boss battles were designed to make players pull on all their available resources, creating puzzles that would leave players satisfied upon completion. No original music was created for the game, with it instead using samples from western classical music that fit the concept. While original music was considered, it was dropped as staff felt it would be "too powerful" for an overseas audience.

According to director Toru Haga, creating an original world and scenario after their time working on licensed properties was challenging. The concept of the Laws, the deities of Impedia, was based on the Eastern philosophical concept of "yin yang wu xing": each "Law" was an aspect or element of the world, which balanced against each other and had two opposing counterparts representing each element. If one part vanished, the balance would be disrupted and the natural would be adversely effected, as portrayed in the game. These concepts influenced the design of the Towers: the first three were designed around wood, earth and water, then later towers representing metal and fire. Each tower was divided into "male" (yang) and "female" (yin) halves. This concept was applied so as to keep the Towers from being repetitive for players, using different shades and designs while retaining their shared symbolic color. The law against eating meat present in the world was inspired by a social phenomenon noted by Yamakura where men and women approached each other counter to popular views on gender relationships, translated as "carnivorous girls and herbivorous boys": this concept gave birth to the scenes of Elena having trouble eating the flesh offerings.

According to Haga, the story's main theme was saving Elena from the curse and then returning to a normal life. The world design, narrative complexity and number of characters was kept to a minimum so players would have their attention directed upon the main characters' plight. When developing the characters, Haga wanted players to relate easily to Aeron, and he was developed to become not too outspoken or assertive. The character Elena was present from the beginning of development, but due to the negative feedback of testers, Elena needed to undergo a major overhaul, including redesigning her monster transformation so that players would sympathize better with her condition, and all the dialogue and cutscenes involving her being redone from scratch. As a result of these developments, the character was portrayed as a strong-willed woman who did not want to be a burden on Aeron despite her condition, in addition to helping him rather than just letting him handle the entire quest. Mavda and her husband were designed to contrast with the relationship between Aeron and Elena: while they looked odd, they were in fact a devoted couple similar to the main protagonists. Her design originated from the initial ideas for the game's merchant, who would have a large pack on their back. She was compared by Haga to cynical witches found in traditional European fairy tales.

== Release ==
Pandora's Tower was first announced in January 2011 during Nintendo's three-quarterly financial report, which was followed shortly by the opening of the official website. At the time, the game was very close to completion, and Nintendo was still working out the marketing. The game's cover art generated controversy in Japan due to the physical similarity of protagonist Aeron to early promotional images of Noctis Lucis Caelum, the protagonist of Final Fantasy Versus XIII. Pandora's Tower was released in Japan on 26 May the same year, published by Nintendo. Pandora's Tower was later confirmed for a European release alongside fellow Wii RPG The Last Story. It was localized in English by the same team that had done Xenoblade Chronicles and later Project Zero 2: Wii Edition, utilizing a British voice cast. It was published in Europe by Nintendo on 13 April 2012. In addition to the standard release, a special edition containing a steelbook casing and artbook alongside the game. Nintendo also published the game in Australia on 12 April.

A North American release for Pandora's Tower was unconfirmed, with Nintendo giving no comment on the matter. In response to this, and similar responses to both The Last Story and Xenoblade Chronicles, a fan campaign dubbed Operation Rainfall was launched with the aim of pushing for a North American release for all three titles. While Xenoblade Chronicles and The Last Story were chosen due to their developer pedigree, Pandora's Tower was chosen due to its unique mechanics and the fact it was also published by Nintendo, in addition to its positive Japanese reception and the fact that it had a planned English release in Europe. When Operation Rainfall focused their attention fully on Pandora's Tower, their campaign included both their standard messaging to Nintendo, and the decision to pitch the game to third-party publishers themselves: the companies they chose to pitch to included Atlus USA, Xseed Games, Aksys Games and NIS America. This part of the campaign was funded by for donations in exchange for special items related to the campaign. The game was eventually picked up by Xseed Games for publication in North America, with their stated reasons including the game's "vocal" Western fan base, and the positive sales and fan support for The Last Story, the second title featured in the Operation Rainfall campaign. The game released on 16 April 2013. Unlike in Europe and the North American release of The Last Story, the North American version of Pandora's Tower did not receive a special edition.

Pandora's Tower was later digitally re-released for the Wii U platform via Nintendo eShop on 4 March 2015. The Wii U eShop version was later released in Europe on 16 April; in Australia on 17 April; and in North America on 13 August. While its North American digital re-release credited Xseed Games as publisher, it was Nintendo that handled publishing for this version, with Xseed Games knowing nothing of the digital release.

== Reception ==
Reception

Aggregate scores
Aggregator	Score
GameRankings	71.74% (Note: Based on 27 reviews)
Metacritic	73/100 (48 reviews)

Review scores
Publication	Score
Computer and Video Games	7.1/10
Destructoid	8/10
Electronic Gaming Monthly	6.5/10
Eurogamer	8/10
Famitsu	7/10, 7/10, 9/10, 8/10
GameSpot	8/10
IGN	7/10
Joystiq	4/5
Official Nintendo Magazine	70%

On aggregate site Metacritic, Pandora's Tower received a score of 73/100 based on 48 critic reviews, denoting "mixed or average" reception. Destructoid's Tony Ponce praised the game's premise and how fleshed out Elena was despite her role as a damsel in distress, but felt that there was too much background lore, and that Aeron's lack of personality hurt the relationship aspect. Andrew Fitch, writing for Electronic Gaming Monthly, praised the world design, but faulted the lack of character development given to Aeron and Elena. Eurogamer's Matt Edwards referred to the game's plot as "a soppy and yet surprisingly sinister love story", saying that moments between the couple raised a genuine smile. IGN's Chris Schilling said that while the story was "slight", it was bolstered by a good localization and voice acting, in addition to darker elements in the plot and during cutscenes. GameSpot's Ashton Raze praised Aeron and Elena's romance as "a grounded, human [story] in a world of monsters". Heidi Kemps, writing for Joystiq, noted genuine emotion in the relationship mechanics of Aeron and Elema, while Steve Hogarty of Official Nintendo Magazine referred to the scenario as "a boy-meets-girl love story with a Clive Barker twist" in addition to praising its dark tone. The game's time limit mechanic and its impact on Elena's condition divided opinion: some praised its implementation, but some critics noted that it might put too much pressure on the player.

Japanese magazine Famitsu praised the gameplay for being both fun and accessible for those not used to action games, with further praise going to the control scheme. Computer and Video Games, reviewing the Japanese version, praised the combat's versatility despite some faults, but found the puzzle elements tedious and criticized the camera. The gameplay was generally praised by Ponce despite some repeating puzzles and enjoyed both the extensive post-game content and level of challenge. In contrast, Fitch found combat repetitive, criticized the fact that enemies respawned after leaving each area, and found elements from the dungeon design to the relationship mechanics poorly implemented when compared to other similar Japanese titles. Despite this, he did enjoy the variety of dungeon designs and the mechanics employed in boss battles. Edwards praised the overall gameplay mechanics, particularly noting the chain's gameplay options and the game's difficulty curve, although he noted that the normal melee combat lacked sophistication when compared to other titles available at the time. Schilling felt that the Oraclos Chain mechanics helped keep the combat interesting in addition to challenging boss battles, but found standard combat repetitive. Raze echoed many of these sentiments, but found that repetitive enemy design and an awkward camera hampered the experience. Kemps found normal weapon combat boring when compared to the Chain, and felt that each available control scheme had advantages and drawbacks related to them. Hogarty enjoyed the boss battles, but found overall combat repetitive and faulted both the controls and the fixed camera.

The music was praised by Famitsu, but one reviewer that it would be "nice if the graphics were better". Computer and Video Games praised the voice acting and music, but noted frequent drops in framerate. Ponce panned the English voice work, saying that it added to the unlikeliness of Aeron and Elena's relationship in addition to poor lip-syncing, and called the textures "very ugly" despite a large color spectrum. Edwards also noted the variety of colors and dungeon design found in the Towers, but noted that the game's pace left little time to admire them. Schilling felt that the art design was hampered by technical limitations and praised the choral musical elements, while Raze praised both the character designs and soundtrack. Kemps called the character and environment design "superb" despite technical limitations, and Hogarty praised the boss monsters' designs and scenic variety.

=== Sales ===
Upon release in Japan, the game entered the top ten best-selling titles of the week at #3, with 21,445 units sold. It had a sell-through rate of just over 48%. The following week, it had dropped to #8, selling a further 8,436 units. By the end of the year, it was among the top 1000 best-selling games of 2011, with total sales of 46,834 units. At its debut in the United Kingdom, it performed poorly, reaching only #38 in the charts. According to Xseed, the game's sales in North America were favorable, although they were not on the same level as The Last Story. In an interview, Xseed said that it might have done better if it had been released in the 2012 holiday season.
