= FFII =

FFII may refer to:

- Final Fantasy II, a 1988 video game
- Fatal Frame II: Crimson Butterfly, a 2003 video game
- Forensic Files II, a 2020 television series
- Foundation for a Free Information Infrastructure, a German non-profit organisation

== See also ==
- FF2 (disambiguation)
