= Fatal Frame: Maiden of Black Water =

2014 video game

- German Wii U cover art featuring protagonists Yuri Kozukata (left) and Miu Hinasaki (right)
- Developer: Koei Tecmo (Note: Additional work by Nintendo SPD)
- Publishers: Nintendo (Wii U); Koei Tecmo
- Director: Makoto Shibata
- Producers: Keisuke Kikuchi; Toshiharu Izuno; Toru Osawa; Akira Otani
- Designers: Makoto Shibata; Yuki Sakamoto
- Writers: Makoto Shibata; Toru Osawa; Toshiharu Izuno
- Composer: Ayako Toyoda
- Series: Fatal Frame
- Platforms: Wii U; Nintendo Switch; PlayStation 4; PlayStation 5; Windows; Xbox One; Xbox Series X/S
- Release: Wii U: JP: September 27, 2014; NA: October 22, 2015; EU: October 30, 2015; AU: October 31, 2015; Nintendo Switch, PlayStation 4, PlayStation 5, Windows, Xbox One, Xbox Series X/S: WW: October 28, 2021
- Genre: Survival horror
- Mode: Single-player

Fatal Frame: Maiden of Black Water (Note: Known in Japan as Zero: Nuregarasu no Miko (零(ゼロ) 〜濡鴉ノ巫女〜; lit. Zero: Black-Haired Shrine Maiden) and in PAL regions as Project Zero: Maiden of Black Water) is a survival horror video game developed by Koei Tecmo and originally published by Nintendo for the Wii U. The fifth main entry in the Fatal Frame series, it was released in Japan in September 2014 and worldwide in October 2015. A remaster for eighth and ninth generation consoles and Windows, this time published by Koei Tecmo, was released worldwide in October 2021.

As with previous games in the series, players navigate areas filled with hostile ghosts which must be fought by taking photographs using the Camera Obscura. A post-endgame story featuring Ayane, a character from the company's Dead or Alive series, also features altered gameplay mechanics. The story, which is set on the fictional Hikami Mountain, focuses on three protagonists who are drawn into supernatural events revolving the area, including an ancient ritual to seal away the Black Water, a malevolent force corrupting the surrounding spirits that is tied to the fate of the titular shrine maiden Ose Kurosawa.

Planning for the game began in 2011, during production of the Wii remake of Fatal Frame II: Crimson Butterfly. Series co-creator Keisuke Kikuchi proposed the project when he saw that the Wii U GamePad could be used as the Camera Obscura. Kikuchi and fellow co-creator Makoto Shibata returned to their respective posts of producer and director, together with both new and returning staff. The cast underwent several revisions during development, while the staff experimented with the capacities of the new hardware. Japanese singer Tsuki Amano returned from earlier entries to produce one of the theme songs. The Wii U original was greatly praised its use of the GamePad and dark atmosphere, while opinions were mixed on its story, pacing and controls. The remaster also saw mixed responses, with the main criticisms being its controls and a lack of frightening elements.

== Gameplay ==
The view through the Camera Obscura. An attacking ghost is repelled using the Camera, which registers the hit as a "Fatal Frame".

Fatal Frame: Maiden of Black Water is a survival horror video game that puts the player in control of three different characters traversing a number of environments across Hikami Mountain from a third-person perspective, including ruined buildings and dark forests. Characters navigate environments using an interactive map, and can either walk or perform a sprint. During exploration, the characters are confronted by hostile ghosts that attack and damage them through touch. If a ghost grabs the character, they can either dodge or break free from their grip.

The only means of defense and attack for the characters is the Camera Obscura, an antique camera that is used from a first-person perspective, with shots of varying proximity and angles affecting how much damage the ghost takes. The most damaging is a "fatal frame", which hits a ghost's weak spot. During combat, after a shot is taken, fragments of a ghost will appear around them. In the original version, the camera is controlled using the Wii U GamePad, while the 2021 remaster adjusts this to work with different console controls.

Aside from the Camera Obscura, other factors are present in play. The characters can glimpse pieces of a ghost's past upon defeating them or when they launch a special attack. Characters can also concentrate on items in the environment related to missing people, generating a shade that leads them to the person's location. A wetness meter tracks how damp the character gets when navigating environments. The amount of wetness has positive and negative effects on the character: being wet increases the damage done by the Camera Obscura while increasing the number of ghosts present in an area and attacks causing more damage. In addition, characters can be inflicted with a status ailment from dark-colored ghosts or from a special attack: this ailment decreases vision and defense, and deteriorating health. The ailment is only lifted by defeating all the enemies in the area or using an item to remove all wetness.

In addition to the three main characters' story arcs, a special episode features Dead or Alive protagonist Ayane. Unlike the other characters, she does not have access to a Camera Obscura, so she must avoid ghosts. If she begins running or gets close to a ghost, they will attack. Ayane can use a special "script of hiding" to make herself temporarily invisible, and when she is caught, she can use a special item to throw back and stun them so she can escape.

== Synopsis ==
Maiden of Black Water takes place on the fictional Hikami Mountain, a place infamous for suicides and spiritual happenings connected with local bodies of water. In the past, resident shrine maidens would use their mind-reading abilities to help guide people to a peaceful death. In time, their emotions would overwhelm them, and would be sacrificed as Eternal Flowers to keep a malevolent otherworldly power called the Black Water at bay. The story follows three different protagonists: Yuri Kozukata, who can bring people back from the shadow world into the real world due to her descent from the Hikami shrine maidens; Ren Hojo, an author and friend of Yuri who goes to the mountain to research his new book with his assistant Rui Kagamiya; and Miu Hinasaki, the daughter of earlier Fatal Frame protagonist Miku Hinasaki.

Among the ghosts they encounter are Shiragiku, a young shrine maiden whose sacrifice preserved her as a wandering spirit; and Kyozo Kururugi, a man who initially went to die on the mountain but developed an insane fear of the shrine maidens due to their mind-reading powers, killing many maidens and priests before committing suicide and becoming a hostile ghost. Many of those Kururugi slew became ghosts in their own right. The central story revolves around Ose Kurosawa, whose near-death experience had left her with powerful sixth sense abilities. Because of this, she became a shrine maiden and was chosen as an Eternal Flower. Before the ritual, Kunihiko Asou, creator of the Camera Obscura, took her photograph. They fell in love, and when the time came for the ritual, Ose's feelings for Asou and the emotions caused by Kururugi's rampage overwhelmed her. The ritual failed, unleashing the Black Water across Mount Hikami, and Ose became a powerful hostile spirit.

Miu, who initially goes there to help Yuri, sees a vision of her mother on the mountain. Later venturing there on her own, she learns that her father was Miku's dead brother Mafuyu: Miu's birth as a child of the living and the dead shortened Miku's life, only surviving this long due to Hikami Mountain's power. Miku goes to see her brother one last time pursued by Miu, and two endings play out depending on Miu's final actions. In the "Bad" ending, Miku goes into the afterlife to be with Mafuyu, leaving Miu alone. In the "Good" ending, Miu saves Miku from the mountain's power.

Ren, while helping Yuri and Miu and investigating the mountains on his own account, regularly crosses paths with Shiragiku. He learns that recurring dreams he has been having are the inherited memories of his ancestor Asou. Depending on his actions, he either unites or breaks up with Ose as Asou's present-day avatar, or puts Shiragiku to rest and returns to the living world.

Yuri's search through the mountain leads to her encountering many of its ghosts and using her Camera Obscura to lay them to rest. Learning of Ose's history, she heads to a final confrontation with her. Depending on where she sees Ose before the final battle, two endings play out. In the "Bad" ending, Yuri commits suicide with Ose, leaving Hisoka in tears. In the "Good" ending, Yuri shares Ose's pain, allowing her and the other spirits to pass on, while Yuri returns to the world of the living with Hisoka by her side. If the player gets the "Good" ending, a post-credits scene plays where Rui wakes up to find Ren in front of her, telling her he will remain by her side forever.

== Development ==
The Wii U GamePad inspired series producer Keisuke Kikuchi to propose a Fatal Frame title to Nintendo for the platform, seeing its possible use as the Camera Obscura.

The initial inspiration for the game came to series co-creator and producer Keisuke Kikuchi after the Wii U's introduction to the industry: similar to his reaction to the Wii for Mask of the Lunar Eclipse, Kikuchi saw multiple gameplay possibilities in the Wii U's gamepad, especially the gamepad becoming the game's Camera Obscura. He was the first to propose the concept to Nintendo, with it becoming a joint production between Koei Tecmo and Nintendo SPD as with Mask of the Lunar Eclipse. The staff included Kikuchi, series co-creator and director Makoto Shibata; and Toshiharu Izuno and Tohru Osawa from Nintendo, who had previously worked on Mask of the Lunar Eclipse. Planning began in 2011, during development of the Wii remake of Fatal Frame II: Crimson Butterfly. The key themes are water and the fear of being wet, with the game's key color being black. These themes were inspired by Shibata's memories of visiting Los Angeles in 2008; compared to the damp summer atmosphere and accompanying supernatural feeling he experienced in Japan, he felt he could not find any ghosts in the local dry American summer. This experience emphasized his view of dampness as an important part of ghost encounters. As with previous games, he made it thinking that it might be the final entry in the series. Maiden of Black Water features a theme song performed by Tsuki Amano, "In This Cage"; Amano had contributed theme songs to the series since Crimson Butterfly. In addition, it features a second theme song by Japanese singer AuJu titled "Higanbana". This too tied in with the wish to create something new for the series, along with showing its status as a high-end game with the inclusion of two theme songs.

The team used traditional Japanese horror as an aesthetic starting point as with earlier Fatal Frame titles, with the main purpose being to make it as frightening for players as possible. In aid of this, the flashback videos and core concept of rescuing people from supernatural hot spots was brought in, although several proposed elements related to this were cut. The main cast went through revisions, although a male character was decided upon early on. Yuri was created relatively quickly, but the team had trouble deciding who the third character would be. An initial idea of having Miku Hinasaki as a playable character was dropped as her story arc had been resolved in earlier games. Instead, the character of Miu was created, with Kikuchi initially thinking her name was a typing error with Miku's name before reading the full story draft. Ren was initially going to record events on the mountain to offer a different perspective. The relationship between Ren and Rui was modeled after that between classic detective character Kogoro Akechi and his live-in assistant Yoshio Kobayashi. The female characters' clothing was designed to make them look "sexy" when it got wet. The story and characters combined elements from four previous Fatal Frame game proposals, with the mountain setting taken from one of those scrapped projects. Maiden of Black Water features the largest number of storylines up to that point, but due to the amount of narrative he wanted to include, Shibata ended up neglecting other elements such as Mount Hikami's history of suicides. Mount Hikami was originally suggested by Nintendo, based around multiple real locations in Japan, particularly Mount Osore and the Tōjinbō sea cliffs.

As it was the first game on a new console, the development team comprised people new to the series, including designers Akira Ohtani and Yuki Sakamoto. While the use of the Wii U gamepad became central to gameplay, several other elements were considered by the developers but did not make it into the final game. These included combat, puzzle and navigation mechanics involving the analogue sticks to promote higher immersion; and using the gamepad's microphone to blow on objects within the game environment. Alongside making a game for dedicated series players, they also added adjustments for new players, partly due to the underway multimedia developments. These changes included adding helpful gameplay features and creating more conversation cutscenes to make the story easier to understand. The pace of gameplay was also made similar to an action game as opposed to previous entries. A mechanic being tested in the game was the necessity to keep dry, initially inspired by the sweating mechanic from Dead or Alive 5. While this was toned down, dampness being tied to the character's well-being remained in the game as both a story and gameplay concept. This aspect was suggested by Ohtani.

The capacities of the Wii U meant that more experimentation with graphics could be done. During the making of the game, the team watched a lot of scary online videos, along with studying lighting and the appearance of being wet. In addition, the flashback cutscenes were made to look grainy and low-quality compared to the present-day cutscenes. While they had initially been visually similar to rest of the game, part of the series' appeal was the fear evoked by unseen objects, so they added distortions. The graphics engine used technology from Dead or Alive 5, with one of the main points of aesthetic similarity was the sexy look of the female characters. To achieve this look, Kikuchi's team collaborated closely with the Dead or Alive development team. The inclusion of Ayane in the game was suggested by Izuno after Ayane's image was used in the initial proposal for Maiden of Black Water. Seeing as her dark character seemed suited to the series, he asked for her inclusion. Team Ninja co-founder Yosuke Hayashi was also keen to see her included. The main idea was that included a popular character from another Koei Tecmo franchise might help broaden the series' fanbase. In bringing her into the game, they attempted to preserve as much of her sex appeal as possible, such as how much her breasts would jiggle. During this process, they frequently received advice from Team Ninja. The shift onto more powerful hardware also enabled the team to incorporate more graphic scenes, which contributed to it receiving a higher CERO rating than previous titles.

== Release ==
The game was first announced in April 2014, alongside multiple media expansions to the franchise, including a Japanese live-action film and an original novel and comic. Its title and release date were revealed during a special Niconico livestream in July. The digital version's large size required the purchasing of an additional external drive for those who did not own a Deluxe Wii U. It was initially claimed by Koei Tecmo's European branch that the game would not be released outside Japan. Its release in Western territories was initially hinted at by Tomonobu Itagaki, who said through his Facebook account that Kikuchi would release the game in North America.

During a Nintendo Direct presentation in April 2015, a Western release for the game was confirmed in both Europe and North America, with two titles: Fatal Frame: Maiden of Black Water for North America and Project Zero: Maiden of Black Water for Europe. Maiden of Black Water was released in Europe on October 30 and in North America on October 22. In Australia, the game released a day after the European version on October 31. The localization was suggested to have been due to fan requests.

In Europe and Australia, the game was exclusively available as a Limited Edition version at retail, as well as a digital version on the Nintendo eShop. While the retail version contained the complete game, the digital version was offered in a free-to-start manner, in which players could experience the game's prologue and first two chapters for free, after which they are given the choice whether or not to pay for unlocking the remaining ones. In North America, only the digital version was available on the Nintendo eShop. This announcement triggered a fan campaign spearheaded by Operation Rainfall to request a physical release for North America. The Western release included Nintendo-themed costumes based on popular characters Princess Zelda and Samus Aran. These costumes replaced lingerie and swimsuit outfits featured in the Japanese release. Yuri Kozukata became the basis of a DLC costume in the Nintendo Switch version of Nights of Azure 2 and reappeared as a summonable Assist Trophy in Super Smash Bros. Ultimate.

A high definition remaster of Maiden of Black Water was released digitally by Koei Tecmo on October 28, 2021 for Nintendo Switch, PlayStation 4, PlayStation 5, Windows, Xbox One, and Xbox Series X/S in 2021. The remaster includes updated visuals, new costumes, and a photo mode. A remaster of Maiden of Black Water was suggested by Kikuchi to celebrate the Fatale Frame series' 20th anniversary, as talks on creating a new title had fallen through multiple times due to a lack of dedicated staff. While initially wary due to the time gap and lack of new games, he was pleased with the positive reactions both in Japan and overseas. Kikuchi felt the most difficult part of the remaster was adjusting the game for each of its new platforms, with Shibata noting Wii U-exclusive features not possible on the new platforms. The graphics were generally improved, including updating some background elements, to improve immersion. The new photo mode was included based on Kikuchi's experience with fans using photo mode in recent Atelier titles. New costumes were created for the characters based on their personalities and in-game traits. These included a cycling suit for Yuu, contrasting goth outfits for Yuu and Miu, and a wedding suit for Ren referencing to his narrative.

== Reception ==
Reception

Aggregate scores
| Aggregator | Score |
|---|---|
| Metacritic | (WIIU) 67/100 (NS) 73/100 (PC) 69/100 (PS4) 71/100 (PS5) 63/100 (XSXS) 60/100 |
| OpenCritic | 41% recommend (Note: Based on 150 reviews) |

Review scores
| Publication | Score |
|---|---|
| Eurogamer | Avoid |
| Famitsu | 7/10, 8/10, 9/10, 9/10 |
| Game Informer | 5.5/10 |
| GameRevolution | 4.5/5 |
| GameSpot | 5/10 |
| IGN | 7/10 |
| Nintendo World Report | 8.5/10 |
| VideoGamer.com | 7/10 |

During its opening week, the game debuted at #7 in Media Create's sales charts, with opening sales of 27,505 units. The following week, it dropped to #11, selling a further 7,105 units and, at that point, bringing total sales to that point to 34,610. Its total sales in 2014 reached 46,099 units, putting it at #142 in the year's best-selling game titles. The Wii U release of Maiden of Black Water received "mixed or average" reviews according to review aggregator website Metacritic, earning a score of 67 out of 100 based on 37 critic reviews.

Game Informer writer Tim Turi disliked both the main and supporting cast, and said that the drawn-out structure of the game harmed the initial premise while also relying too heavily on written documents in the environment for storytelling. GameSpot's Alexa Ray Corriea was unimpressed by the story, saying that early story revelations and backtracking hurt the pacing and dramatic value, while the main characters were underdeveloped. She also felt that the game's darker themes were treated as window dressing rather than used to the full. Daniel Krupa of IGN praised the atmosphere and the disturbing nature of the backstory, and the way the three main characters' roles were balanced out. Nintendo World Report's Andrew Brown cited the main cast as being more "down to earth and relatable" than those from previous games in the series, and said that it was easy for players to sympathize with the ghosts encountered. Ryan Bates of Game Revolution, while enjoying the creepy atmosphere, found the number of characters introduced early on confusing. VideoGamer.com's Tom Orry praised the character and enemy design, while faulting the English dub and feeling that the female characters' revealing outfits clashed with the game's atmosphere. Eurogamer's Aoife Wilson was highly critical, calling the story "half-baked" and generally faulting the characters in comparison to previous games in the series. Famitsu similarly criticized the attire of female characters disrupting the atmosphere. Dengeki, while again faulting the female characters' clothing, praised the game's use of Japanese horror elements to disturbing effect.

Corriea praised the graphics and lighting effects, although saying they were "not the sharpest". Brown, while noting some blurry textures and blocky structures, generally cited the lighting and other graphic effects as one of the game's high points. Dengeki also noted the game's graphics, stating that their quality and realistic character movement gave the main characters a high quality feel.

Krupa enjoyed both the use of the Wii U gamepad as the Camera Obscura and combat for most of the game, but found later sections tedious due to repetitive battles. Corriea liked the use of the gamepad despite some control issues, Bates was highly positive about the thrill it brought into battles, while Turi found that the function did not bring long-term enjoyment and that backtracking through environments negatively impacted on the experience. Wilson likewise enjoyed the gamepad's role in the game, while faulting most other aspects including the high amount of health items and character controls. Orry said that the new controls made combat more claustrophobic than in previous games, while Brown enjoyed the immersion the gamepad brought. Famitsu was highly positive about the use of the gamepad, saying that it felt like you were in the midst of battles. These sentiments were echoed by Dengeki, but stated that some combat situations made aiming difficult. Multiple reviewers mentioned and generally faulted the stiff controls and character movement.

According to Famitsu, during its debut week the physical version of the remaster sold nearly 43,000 units. In Taiwan, the PlayStation 4 version debuted at number 4 while the Switch version debuted at number 5. The following week, the PlayStation 4 version remained at number four on the Taiwanese video game chart. Koei Tecmo announced in January 2022 that the game had sold over 340,000 worldwide during 2021.

The remaster was also given a "mixed or average" score based on reviews across its platforms, with the Switch and PS4 versions ranking slightly higher than others. Joe DeVader of Nintendo World Report generally enjoyed the atmosphere and gameplay, though found issues with its controls and characters, and was pleased the game had been brought to more platforms. Shaun Musgrave of Touch Arcade described Maiden of Black Water as a satisfying game for pre-existing fans made more accessible with the remaster, but felt series newcomers might find issue with its controls. Destructoid's Dan Roemer was fairly negative, calling it outdated and lacking scares despite enjoyable boss encounters and a strong setting design.
