= Quantum Theory (video game) =

2010 video game

- European box art
- Developer: Team Tachyon
- Publisher: Tecmo Koei
- Director: Makoto Shibata
- Producer: Kohei Shibata
- Designers: Tsuyoshi Iuchi; Toshiaki Kubota
- Writer: Masayuki Nagamine
- Engine: Unreal Engine 3
- Platforms: PlayStation 3, Xbox 360
- Release: EU: September 24, 2010; NA: September 28, 2010; AU/JP: September 30, 2010
- Genre: Third-person shooter
- Modes: Single-player, multiplayer

Quantum Theory (クウォンタム セオリー, Kuuontamu Seorī) is a third-person shooter video game developed by Team Tachyon and published by Tecmo Koei for the PlayStation 3 and Xbox 360. It was released in September 2010. The game centers on two characters named Syd and Filena who must fight through a "living tower". The game features a cover system that constantly adds and removes cover.

== Gameplay ==
The game is a third-person shooter incorporating a cover system. Gameplay is very similar to Gears of War. Players can fire their weapon from the hip, aim down the weapon sight for precision, or blindfire from cover. Enemies explode upon death and a successful headshot is rewarded by a slow motion close up view of the head exploding. Syd can throw Filena as a projectile weapon. Syd can use his guns as melee weapons. Syd's initial melee attack can also result in a follow-up attack by Filena. Some levels feature environments that can change dynamically, including moving platforms that Syd must hang on to or jump off. Bosses make appearances throughout the campaign, requiring the player to identify and target their weak points.

== Plot ==
=== Setting ===
Set in an organic sci-fi world, years have passed since a world war left the world in a catastrophic state, leaving only a few survivors. In a new community "Cocoon", life has been threatened by a black material called Erosion, creating a post-apocalyptic environment. Surviving humans form a militia to conquer the Erosion and set out to take down the "Living Tower". The main character, Syd, intends to destroy the Tower. He meets Filena along the way, as they both ascend to the top in their search for answers. The tower is constantly eroding, and intensifies as the game progresses.

=== Story ===
Most of the story takes place within the tower, beginning with Syd and a woman named Nyx trying to escape the tower as it begins to fall apart. As they continue to fight their way out, Nyx suddenly collapses, dying. Syd reveals that because she is part of the tower, she will die with it. Syd leaves Nyx behind telling her to "die well". Syd then escapes the tower through unknown means. The story then flashes forward to where Syd and other soldiers fight through destroyed city streets against the Diablosis as they make their way into the "living tower". A poisonous growth called "the erosion" lives there, and their mission is to destroy the tower along with the erosion. The entire squad Syd is with is wiped out but he manages to enter the tower.

Syd meets Filena for the first time when he sees her fighting the Nosferatu and comes to her aid. After dispatching the enemy the two engage in a Mexican stand-off, after which they go their separate ways in the tower. Filena and Syd meet again later on and reveal to each other their opposing quests: Syd is out to destroy the tower while Filena wants to save it from the erosion. The two battle to a stalemate as their fight is interrupted by the Diablosis, whom they must fight together in order to survive. The two agree to join forces for the time being. Filena tells Syd that her father created the tower, while throughout the story a voice speaks through the loud speaker in the tower, providing context.

Later in the game flashback levels show Syd as a rookie, donning a mask which is broken in a later flashback, resulting in the x-shaped scar on Syd's forehead. During this time he was part of a squad of exiled Gilskins, the leader carrying the Revenant weapon Syd now uses. The entire squad is wiped out during a battle with Diablosis, only Syd survives, now using the leader's Revenant.

Syd and Filena belong to warring factions, the Gilskins and the Nosferatu, respectively. Syd and Filena join, but split up later on. Syd and Filena meet up again, and Filena discovers that she is not human, but the prototype of a new breed of humanoids that her father had engineered. She is also the missing component that would empower the Diablosis as they merge with the erosion. Syd and Filena battle the main Diablosis, but the Diablosis eventually absorbs Filena. Syd kills it and frees Filena.

Filena and Syd make their way up to the top floor of the tower before confronting the brain of the tower, which instructs Filena to kill Syd. Filena points her weapon at Syd only to change her mind at the last second and open fire on the brain. This causes the entire tower to be destroyed. After the credits both Syd and Filena are seen going towards another tower.

== Reception ==
Reception

Aggregate score
Aggregator	Score	
Aggregator	PS3	Xbox 360
Metacritic	43/100	37/100

Review scores
Publication	Score	
Publication	PS3	Xbox 360
1Up.com	C−	C−
Destructoid	N/A	2.5/10
Edge	N/A	3/10
Eurogamer	N/A	3/10
Famitsu	31/40	31/40
GamePro	N/A	3/5
GameRevolution	C−	C−
GameSpot	N/A	4/10
GameTrailers	N/A	5.8/10
Hardcore Gamer	2.75/5	2.75/5
IGN	2.5/10	2.5/10
Joystiq	N/A	1.5/5
Official Xbox Magazine (US)	N/A	6.5/10
PlayStation: The Official Magazine	4/10	N/A
411Mania	2/10	2/10
Metro	N/A	3/10

Quantum Theory received "unfavorable" reviews on both platforms according to the review aggregation website Metacritic. In Japan, however, Famitsu gave it a score of three eights and one seven for a total of 31 out of 40. GameZone gave it four out of ten, saying that the game "looks and feels like an anime-inspired fan mod of Gears of War 1. While I'm a devout supporter of doing things right the first time, I wouldn't mind seeing a sequel that steps up its game, makes better use of Filena, and learns from the critical feedback the original received (which is nearly insurmountable at this point)."
