= Fatal Frame II: Crimson Butterfly Remake =

2026 video game

- Official artwork
- Developer: Team Ninja
- Publisher: Koei Tecmo
- Directors: Makoto Shibata; Hidehiko Nakajima
- Producer: Fumihiko Yasuda
- Designer: Masaki Yokota
- Programmer: Yuji Fukushi
- Artist: Kaito Sato
- Composer: Ayako Toyoda
- Series: Fatal Frame
- Engine: Katana Engine
- Platforms: Nintendo Switch 2; PlayStation 5; Windows; Xbox Series X/S
- Release: 12 March 2026
- Genre: Survival horror
- Mode: Single-player

Fatal Frame II: Crimson Butterfly Remake is a 2026 survival horror game developed by Team Ninja and published by Koei Tecmo. It is a remake of Fatal Frame II: Crimson Butterfly, originally developed and published by Tecmo for the PlayStation 2 in 2003. It was released on March 12 for the Nintendo Switch 2, PlayStation 5, Windows, and Xbox Series X/S.

== Gameplay ==
Crimson Butterfly is a survival horror game played from a third-person view. The player uses Fatal Frame's signature mechanic, the Camera Obscura, to fight against spirits.

== Synopsis ==
Twins Mio and Mayu Amakura visit a woodland soon to be flooded by a dam project; while playing there as children, Mayu fell and permanently injured her leg trying to keep up with a running Mio, leaving their relationship strained. A crimson butterfly leads the twins to Minakami Village, a place said to trap outsiders. The two are assaulted by ghosts, including the spirit of Sae Kurosawa who begins influencing Mayu. Years before, Sae and her twin sister Yae were to be sacrifices to pacify a power beneath the village dubbed the "Hellish Abyss"; the ritual involved one twin strangling the other, merging their souls into a crimson butterfly. Yae fled the village, and when Sae was sacrificed alone the Hellish Abyss consumed the village and Sae returned as a powerful vengeful spirit. Sae now seeks to reenact the ritual through Mio and Mayu.

The game has six endings, four of them carried over from the original game and its Xbox port, and a new ending with a post-credit cutscene if the player completes the "Remaining Sunset" ending.

== Release ==
Fatal Frame II: Crimson Butterfly Remake was officially announced on 12 September 2025, in a Nintendo Direct presentation. The announcement came in the form of a trailer, and a release date was revealed as well. According to Koei Tecmo, the game has been completely remade, with the graphics, sound and gameplay being overhauled. As well, a new gameplay mechanic was announced, namely the ability for the player to hold hands with a character in the game, Mayu.

On 27 January, Koei Tecmo revealed a collaboration with Konami's Silent Hill f and Square Enix's Paranormasight: The Mermaid's Curse in March. Free in-game costumes would be included with the collaboration. More details are expected to be announced in the future.

A demo was released worldwide on 5 March 2026, for all platforms. The game was released on 12 March 2026 both physically and digitally; the extra digital release comes in two versions, the Digital Edition and the Digital Deluxe Edition.

On March 27, the free collaboration DLC between Fatal Frame II: Crimson Butterfly Remake and Silent Hill f was officially released.

== Reception ==
Reception

Aggregate scores
Aggregator	Score
Metacritic	(NS2) 78/100 (PC) 80/100 (PS5) 74/100 (XSXS) 74/100
OpenCritic	69% recommend (Note: Based on 119 reviews)

Review scores
Publication	Score
Game Informer	6/10
Hardcore Gamer	3.5/5
IGN	8/10
Nintendo Life	7/10
Nintendo World Report	8.5/10
Push Square	7/10

Fatal Frame II: Crimson Butterfly Remake received "generally favorable" reviews for the Nintendo Switch 2 and Windows versions while the PlayStation 5 and Xbox Series X/S versions received "mixed or average" reviews, according to review aggregator website Metacritic. Fellow review aggregator OpenCritic assessed that the game received strong approval, being recommended by 69% of critics.
