= Fatal Frame =

Fatal Frame / Project Zero
- Logo used in North American releases from the second game onward
- Genres: Survival horror Photography game
- Developers: Koei Tecmo (Tecmo), Grasshopper Manufacture, Nintendo Software Planning & Development, Team Ninja
- Publishers: JP: Koei Tecmo (Tecmo), Nintendo; NA: Koei Tecmo (Tecmo), Nintendo; EU: Microsoft Game Studios, Nintendo, Take-Two Interactive, Ubisoft, Wanadoo
- Creators: Makoto Shibata, Keisuke Kikuchi
- Platforms: PlayStation 2, Microsoft Windows, Nintendo 3DS, Nintendo Switch, PlayStation 4, PlayStation 5, Wii, Wii U, Xbox, Xbox One, Xbox Series X/S, Nintendo Switch 2
- First release: Fatal Frame; December 13, 2001
- Latest release: Fatal Frame II: Crimson Butterfly Remake; March 12, 2026
- Spin-offs: Spirit Camera

Fatal Frame, titled Zero (Note: Japanese: 零(ゼロ)) in Japan and Project Zero in Europe and Australia, is a Japanese survival horror video game series that was created, published, and developed by Koei Tecmo (originally Tecmo). Debuting in 2001 with the first entry in the series for the PlayStation 2, the series consists of five main entries. The series is set in 1980s Japan, with each entry focusing on a location beset by hostile supernatural events. In each scenario, the characters involved in the present investigation use Camera Obscura, objects created by Dr. Kunihiko Asou that can capture and pacify spirits. The series draws on staple elements of Japanese horror, and is noted for its frequent use of female protagonists.

The series was conceived by Makoto Shibata and Keisuke Kikuchi. After being introduced to the PlayStation 2 hardware and after the success of the Silent Hill series, the pair decided to develop a horror series inspired by Shibata's own spiritual experiences and popular Japanese horror films of the time. Their main goal was to make the most frightening game experience possible. Later installments have refined the gameplay mechanics while also adding more complex narrative elements.

The series is recognized as one of the best-known horror video game franchises, and the second game in the series, Crimson Butterfly, is considered one of the scariest horror games ever made. While the sales of individual games have never been high, the series as a whole has sold over one million copies worldwide as of April 2014. Multiple Japanese adaptations have been made, including manga and a 2014 live-action feature film.

== Titles ==
As of 2014, the series consists of five main-line video games, not counting remakes, rereleases and spin-offs. Fatal Frame: Mask of the Lunar Eclipse was originally only released in Japan. While a European release was planned, it was eventually cancelled, and no North American release was planned. A fan translation of the fourth game was released in 2010, which enabled the game to be played on any Wii system. Outside their international releases, the Fatal Frame games are not numbered. This was due to the series' creators considering each entry to be a standalone game, with minimal connections to previous titles. Since the fourth game, new Fatal Frame titles have been funded and co-developed by Nintendo, resulting in new series titles since the fourth game originally only appearing on Nintendo consoles. Koei Tecmo would later purchase Nintendo's publishing rights for multi platform rereleases of Fatal Frame: Mask of the Lunar Eclipse and Fatal Frame: Maiden of Black Water.

=== Video games ===
==== Main series ====
Release timeline
2001	Fatal Frame
2002
2003	Fatal Frame II: Crimson Butterfly
2004
2005	Fatal Frame III: The Tormented
2006
2007
2008	Fatal Frame: Mask of the Lunar Eclipse
2009
2010
2011
2012	Spirit Camera
2012	Project Zero 2: Wii Edition
2013
2014	Fatal Frame: Maiden of Black Water
2015
2016
2017
2018
2019
2020
2021	Fatal Frame: Maiden of Black Water (remaster)
2022
2023	Fatal Frame: Mask of the Lunar Eclipse (remaster)
2024
2025
2026	Fatal Frame II: Crimson Butterfly Remake

The titular first entry (Note: Titled Zero (零(ゼロ) 〜zero〜) in Japan and Project Zero in Europe.) in the series was released on the PlayStation 2 in 2001 in Japan and 2002 in North America and Europe and on the Xbox in 2002 in North America and 2003 in Europe. The second game, Fatal Frame II: Crimson Butterfly, (Note: Titled Zero 〜Akai Chō〜 (零(ゼロ) 〜紅い蝶〜) and Project Zero 2: Crimson Butterfly in Europe.) was released again for PlayStation 2 in 2003 in Japan and North America, and 2004 in Europe as well as for Xbox in 2004 in North America and in 2005 in Europe. Fatal Frame III: The Tormented (Note: Titled Zero: Shisei no Koe (零(ゼロ) 〜刺青ノ聲〜; lit. Zero: Voice of the Tattoo.) and Project Zero 3: The Tormented in Europe.) likewise released for the PlayStation 2 in 2005 for Japan and North America, and 2006 in Europe. In 2008, Fatal Frame: Mask of the Lunar Eclipse (Note: Titled Zero: Tsukihami no Kamen (零(ゼロ) 〜月蝕の仮面〜; lit. Zero: Mask of the Lunar Eclipse) in Japan and Project Zero: Mask of the Lunar Eclipse in Europe.) released in Japan for the Wii and later received a fan-translation in 2010, and an official worldwide release by Koei Tecmo in 2023 for the Nintendo Switch, PlayStation 4, PlayStation 5, Xbox One, Xbox Series X/S, and Microsoft Windows. The fifth title, Fatal Frame: Maiden of Black Water, (Note: Titled Zero: Nuregarasu no Miko (零(ゼロ) 〜濡鴉ノ巫女〜; lit. Zero: The Raven-haired Shrine Maiden) in Japan and Project Zero: Maiden of Black Water in Europe.) was released for the Wii U in 2014 in Japan and 2015 in North America, Europe and Australia. During Nintendo's E3 2021 Nintendo Direct, it was announced that a remaster of Fatal Frame: Maiden of Black Water will be available later in 2021. The new version was released on the Nintendo Switch, PlayStation 4, PlayStation 5, Xbox One, Xbox Series X/S, and Microsoft Windows.

==== Spin-off and remake ====
The first two titles have received expanded re-releases. An expanded port of the original game was released for the Xbox in 2002 in Japan and 2003 in Western territories. It featured additional story elements, gameplay refinements and a new difficulty setting. For Crimson Butterfly, a "Director's Cut" for the Xbox was released in 2004 in Japan and North America, and 2005 in Europe. A new expanded remake for the Wii was released in Japan and Europe in 2012. A second remake was released worldwide for the Nintendo Switch 2, PlayStation 5, Xbox Series X/S, and Windows in 2026.

A mobile title, Real Zero, was released in 2004 for FOMA and DoCoMo mobile devices. The game involves users taking pictures of their environments and superimposing ghost images somewhere in the frame. Seventy different ghosts were available to collect, with each new ghost triggering the sending of an email to provide clues for finding the next ghost or other messages. The game's service was terminated in 2011. A spin-off for the Nintendo 3DS, Spirit Camera, (Note: Titled Spirit Camera: The Possessed Notebook (心霊カメラ 〜憑いてる手帳〜, Shinrei Camera ~Tsuiteru Techou~) in Japan and Spirit Camera: The Cursed Memoir in Western territories.) was released in all regions in 2012. The story follows a girl named Maya, who is trapped in a haunted house controlled by a mysterious woman in black, and seeks to escape the woman's control.

=== Pachinko ===
In May 2020, a pachislot machine simply titled Pachislot Zero was announced by Yamasa Group. Released in Japan for pachinko parlors in July 2020, the game recreates scenes from the first game in the series with updated graphics, along with additions like new characters and a third ending.

=== Related media ===
Zero4D

To commemorate the release of Crimson Butterfly, a special interactive attraction titled Zero4D opened in 2004 in Tokyo. It featured movie scenes designed by the same team behind the CGI movies for Crimson Butterfly. A manga based on the series written by Shin Kibayashi, Fatal Frame: Shadow Priestess, (Note: Zero: Kage Miko (零 影巫女)) was released in both Japanese and English through DeNA's website in July 2014.

Gekijjoban Zero

A Japanese live-action movie directed by Mari Asato for Kadokawa Pictures was released in cinemas in 2014. The novel it was based on, Fatal Frame: A Curse Affecting Only Girls by Eiji Ohtsuka, was released a few months prior to the movie.

Planned American film

A Hollywood film adaptation of the first game was announced in 2003. Robert Fyvolent and Mark R. Brinker were hired as the project's writers, and John Rogers was hired as its producer. The title was being produced by DreamWorks. Later that year, Steven Spielberg was helping Rogers to polish the game's script, and that sessions to find a director and cast for the movie would follow. In 2014 alongside the formal announcement of Maiden of Black Water, it was confirmed that the Hollywood film was still planned. Now produced by Samuel Hadida, it was set to begin production after the completion and release of the game. Christophe Gans said in an interview that the movie will take place in Japan in an attempt to capture its Japanese haunted house setting.

== Common elements ==
=== Series gameplay ===
The gameplay has remained consistent through the series' lifetime. Each environment is filled with ghosts, with separate games having different attack behaviors for them. While navigating these environments, the main character's only means of defense is the Camera Obscura, which can be used to damage ghosts, capturing them on film and pacifying them. When using the camera, the view switches from a third-person to a first-person perspective. The camera locks onto a ghost, with the amount of damage dealt depending on how much of a focus the Camera Obscura has on the ghost, but ghosts fade in and out of existence, making focusing more challenging. Shots of varying closeness and angles also affect how much damage the ghost takes. The most damaging is a "Fatal Frame", which is performed by taking a photo just before a ghost's attack lands, dealing massive damage and allowing a combo if subsequent shots are timed correctly. A ghost's captured spirit energy is converted into points, which can be used to buy items to upgrade the Camera Obscura and obtain more powerful film.

In addition to hostile ghosts, there are passive ghosts encountered in parts of the environment: if they are not caught on film at once, they vanish from the rest of the game. Ghosts captured on film are added to a list, which reveals a ghost's past. For the first three games, navigation is done using semi-fixed third-person view of environments, with characters moving at a slow pace through them. For Mask of the Lunar Eclipse and later entries, the camera perspective was altered to a third-person over-the-shoulder view and character movement was increased a little to speed up gameplay. The ability to either dodge or break free from a ghost's grip was added in Maiden of Black Water.

=== Setting ===
Majority of the Fatal Frame / Project Zero series is set in the 1980s, before mobile phones were commonly used in Japan. Aside from a few recurring characters, each game has a self-contained story focusing on a different supernatural threat. The main unifying factor is navigating through haunted locations struck by a supernatural catastrophe, with a recurring setting being abandoned Japanese mansions. Recurring characters include Dr. Kunihiko Asou, an occultist who lived in the 1800s and created objects such as the Camera Obscura; and Miku Hinasaki, the protagonist of Fatal Frame and one of three protagonists in The Tormented, who also appears in Maiden of Black Water as one of the main characters' missing mother. A second recurring feature is the exclusive or frequent use of female characters in the leading role. This was explained as being due to the overall tone of the series: since traditional violence was not used, it was better to use a female character to convey this. It was also felt that women were more spiritually aware than men. Another recurring concept is a pseudo-physical location bridging the physical and spiritual worlds, inspired by a tanka written by Japanese poet Taeko Kuzuhara: these were represented by the Hellish Abyss in Crimson Butterfly and the lake in Maiden of Black Water.

The first Fatal Frame is set in 1986, taking place in the Himuro Mansion located in the mountains of northeastern Japan. The second game,Crimson Butterfly is set in 1988, following a pair of twins who find themselves trapped in a haunted village that mysteriously vanished during the Meiji era. The Tormented is set two months after the second game's events, featuring the Manor of Sleep, the dream-world version of an abandoned shrine.Mask of the Lunar Eclipse takes place in 1989, notorious for being wrongly assumed to be a prequel set in 1980 due to errors in its unofficial translation., taking place on an island ghost town where an abandoned hospital is located. The fifth game, Maiden of Black Water, is the first to be set in the 21st century, taking place in 2006 around a mountain forest infamous for suicides and rituals associated with local bodies of water. It features not only the return of the main protagonist of the first game as a major character but also her daughter as one of the main playable protagonists.

== History and development ==
The concept for Fatal Frame / Project Zero first occurred by Makoto Shibata. The idea occurred after the development of Tecmo's Deception: Invitation to Darkness. Inspired by his own experiences of supernatural events, and heartened by the success of the Silent Hill series, Shibata and Keisuke Kikuchi set to work on creating the basics for the game. Shibata was in charge of the majority of game and scenario development, while Kikuchi was in charge of general oversight. When creating the atmosphere, the team watched both high and low-budget Japanese horror films, and war films. One of their goals was to make the game as scary as possible. The Camera Obscura was not in the initial discussions between Shibata and Kikuchi, with the original idea being that ghosts would be avoided and repelled by light. Ultimately, they decided to have a type of offensive power, which resulted in the Camera's creation. Kikuchi was initially opposed to the idea, but saw that it fit very well into the game's context as development progressed. The first game was marketed in the West as being based on a true story, and while this was not accurate, the story of Fatal Frame was inspired by both real locations noted for alleged haunting and local ghost-related folklore.

For Crimson Butterfly, the team toned down the frightening aspects so players would be willing to complete a playthrough, alongside creating a stronger story. The story was inspired by a dream Shibata had, with the interpretive nature of the game's events being inspired by his feelings about the dream. For The Tormented, they decided to focus on horror elements emerging out of everyday life, focusing on the effects of dreams upon reality. Mask of the Lunar Eclipse was co-produced by Koei Tecmo, Nintendo and Grasshopper Manufacture, with Grasshopper Manufacture's Goichi Suda acting as a co-director with Shibata. The gameplay was constructed around the Wii hardware, with the main concept being for players to feel the fear physically. The entire concept occurred by Kikuchi when he saw the specifications for the Wii. Maiden of Black Water originated when Kikuchi saw the Wii U hardware, and was co-produced by Koei Tecmo and Nintendo. As they wanted to bring more people into the series, they included a stronger narrative and new gameplay elements to make the experience easier for newcomers.

Since Crimson Butterfly, theme songs have been created for each title, primarily performed by Japanese singer Tsuki Amano. The development team wanted an image song for Crimson Butterfly, and Shibata found the then-newly debuted Amano in the Japanese independent community. Amano created the song using documents on the game's story, themes and setting. Amano returned multiple times to create theme songs for The Tormented, Mask of the Lunar Eclipse, and a new theme song for the Wii remake of Crimson Butterfly. She again returned for Maiden of Black Water, and a second new singer AnJu contributed a second theme song to the title.

== Reception ==
Aggregate review scores
Game	Metacritic
Fatal Frame	(PS2) 74/100 (Xbox) 77/100
Fatal Frame II: Crimson Butterfly	(PS2) 81/100 (Wii) 77/100 (Xbox) 84/100
Fatal Frame III: The Tormented	(PS2) 78/100
Fatal Frame: Mask of the Lunar Eclipse	(NS) 73/100 (PC) 69/100 (PS5) 67/100 (XSXS) 64/100
Spirit Camera: The Cursed Memoir	(3DS) 54/100
Fatal Frame: Maiden of Black Water	(NS) 73/100 (PC) 69/100 (PS4) 71/100 (PS5) 63/100 (WIIU) 67/100 (XSXS) 60/100

In Japan, each title in the Fatal Frame / Project Zero series has seen modest success: the first game's lifetime sales are the lowest in the series, while Mask of the Lunar Eclipse currently stands as the best-selling title in the series to date. Since its debut in 2001, the Fatal Frame series has sold 1.3 million copies worldwide.

Multiple video game journalists have singled out the series. IGN's Clara Barraza, in an article on the evolution of the survival horror genre, said that the first game "broke away from the use of weapons like guns and planks of wood to switch it up and try something completely different", praising the use of the Camera Obscura in evoking a sense of fear and calling the game "[a] unique spin on the genre". In a different article for IGN on the history of survival horror, editor Travis Fahs stated that the series gave a much-needed boost to the genre during a period of decline in the early 2000s, highlighting the Japanese horror aesthetic as a selling point that attracted players in tandem with the popularity of The Ring. As part of an interview with the series' creators in 2006, GameSpy writer Christian Nutt referred to it as one of the three best-known horror video game series alongside Resident Evil and Silent Hill. Similarly, as part of a review of Maiden of Black Water, Dennis Scimeca of The Daily Dot ranked the Fatal Frame series alongside Resident Evil and Silent Hill. In an article on the series, Kotaku writer Richard Eisenbeis said that Fatal Frame succeeded in drawing his attention when most other horror games did not, generally praising the settings and the "master stroke" of the Camera Obscura in gameplay. In an interview, F.E.A.R. 2: Project Origin art leader Dave Matthews stated that the gameplay of F.E.A.R. 2 was influenced by the Fatal Frame series. In multiple articles, Crimson Butterfly has been singled out by video game publications and industry developers as one of the scariest games of the horror genre in general.
