= Makoto Shibata =

Japanese video game director and scenario writer

- 柴田 誠
- Occupations: Video game writer, director
- Years active: 1996–present
- Employer: Koei Tecmo
- Notable work: Fatal Frame series

Makoto Shibata (Japanese: 柴田 誠, Hepburn: Shibata Makoto) is a Japanese video game director and scenario writer employed by Koei Tecmo (formerly Tecmo). He is better known as the creator of the Fatal Frame series.

== Work ==
=== Video games ===
Year	Title	Role
1996	Deception	Voice talent
1998	Mega Man Legends	Tester
1998	Kagero: Deception II	Main planner
1998	Chameleon Twist 2	Debugging team
1999	Deception III: Dark Delusion	Director, Scenario writer
2001	Gallop Racer 2001	Planner
2001	Fatal Frame	Director, Scenario writer
2003	Fatal Frame II: Crimson Butterfly	Director, Scenario writer
2005	Trapt	Director, Scenario writer
2005	Fatal Frame III: The Tormented	Director, Scenario writer
2008	Fatal Frame: Mask of the Lunar Eclipse	Director, Scenario writer
2010	Quantum Theory	Director
2012	Project Zero 2: Wii Edition	Director, Scenario writer
2014	Fatal Frame: Maiden of Black Water	Director, Scenario writer
2016	Deception IV: The Nightmare Princess	Director, Scenario writer
2017	Nioh	Story, original game director (uncredited)
2017	Nights of Azure 2: Bride of the New Moon	Scenario writer
2019	Marvel Ultimate Alliance 3: The Black Order	Story
2021	Fatal Frame: Maiden of Black Water (remaster)	Series director
2023	Fatal Frame: Mask of the Lunar Eclipse (remaster)	Supervisor
2024	Rise of the Rōnin	Narrative design
2026	Nioh 3	Story
2026	Fatal Frame II: Crimson Butterfly Remake	Director

=== Films ===
Year	Title	Role
2001	Pokémon 4Ever	Optical effects
2004	Vital	Digital input/output
2010	Norwegian Wood	Lab supervisor
