= Kurosawa Kinko =

Japanese shakuhachi instructor and samurai

Kurosawa Kinko (黒沢 琴古) was an 18th-century komusō of the Fuke sect of Zen Buddhism. A former samurai, he became a shakuhachi instructor and founded the Kinko-Ryu (ja) school of shakuhachi.

Commissioned to travel around Japan to research and collect spiritual shakuhachi music pieces (honkyoku) from his fellow mendicant monks, Kurosawa is credited with helping shakuhachi music transition from a solely spiritual tool into music appreciated by a secular audience through his selection of 36 honkyoku chosen to form the shakuhachi repertoire of the Kinko-Ryu school to be played by its priests.

== Legacy ==
The Kurosawa crater on the planet Mercury is named for Kurosawa Kinko.

Shika No Tone (Distant Calls of Deer), a honkyoku arranged by Kurosawa, is featured on the Memoirs of a Geisha soundtrack.
