= Project Zero 2: Wii Edition =

2012 video game

- European cover art featuring main antagonist Sae
- Developer: Tecmo Koei Games
- Publisher: Nintendo
- Directors: Makoto Shibata; Toru Osawa
- Producers: Keisuke Kikuchi; Toshiharu Izuno
- Designers: Tomo Matayoshi; Takanori Murakami; Shingo Suzuki; Hisanori Takeuchi
- Programmers: Toru Osawa; Toshiharu Izuno
- Composer: Riichiro Kuwabara
- Series: Fatal Frame
- Platform: Wii
- Release: JP: 28 June 2012; AU: 28 June 2012; EU: 29 June 2012
- Genre: Survival horror
- Mode: Single-player

Project Zero 2: Wii Edition, known in Japan as Zero: Shinku no Chō, (Note: Japanese: 零(ゼロ) 〜眞紅の蝶〜; lit. Zero: Deep Crimson Butterfly) is a 2012 survival horror video game developed by Tecmo Koei Games and published by Nintendo for the Wii. The game is a remake of Fatal Frame II: Crimson Butterfly (2003), and follows sisters Mio and Mayu Amakura as they are trapped in a ghost-filled village cursed by a failed ritual. Gameplay follows Mio as she explores the village searching for Mayu, fighting hostile ghosts using the Fatal Frame series' recurring Camera Obscura. The game includes new endings, and an on-rails first-person minigame.

Original director Makoto Shibata and producer Keisuke Kikuchi reprised their roles, incorporating unused concepts from Fatal Frame: Mask of the Lunar Eclipse (2008). The gameplay was reworked based on Mask of the Lunar Eclipse, and the characters and environments redesigned. Singer-songwriter Tsuki Amano returned to provide a new theme song. It was released in Japan and PAL regions, but not in North America. Journalists generally praised the gameplay alterations compared to the original, but faulted its control scheme and English dub.

== Gameplay ==
The graphics and camera control of Project Zero 2 were reworked from the original fixed-perspective angles (top image) to over-the-shoulder angles for the Wii remake (bottom image).

Project Zero 2: Wii Edition is a survival horror in which the player controls Mio Amakura as she searches for her twin sister Mayu in the haunted Minakami Village. The game is a remake of Fatal Frame II: Crimson Butterfly (2003). Basic gameplay is carried over from the original. Mio explores Minakami Village, solving puzzles and fighting hostile ghosts to progress through the game. She can pick up progression items and resources including health restoratives and film types, with the latter of which serving as ammunition for the Fatal Frame series' recurring weapon the Camera Obscura. Using the Camera Obscura when ghosts appear, the game switches to a first-person perspective where Mio must take photos of ghosts to damage them. Greater damage is dealt when a ghost is photographed at chose range, in mid-attack, or when multiple ghosts are caught in the same shot. The Camera Obscura can be upgraded using lenses found during the game, and points earned by both defeating hostile ghosts and taking photographs of non-hostile ghosts which briefly appear.

Unlike the overhead fixed-perspective camera of the original, Project Zero 2: Wii Edition uses an over-the-shoulder camera similar to Resident Evil 4. The controls are adjusted for the Wii Remote and Nunchuck, incorporating motion control elements for controlling the Camera Obscura and aiming a torch in earlier parts of the game. An element carried over from the fourth series entry Mask of the Lunar Eclipse is the need to hold the action button to interact with objects or pick up items. A ghost hand may randomly appear and attack while the button is held, requiring Mio to break free if caught. A new game mode is "Haunted House", a first-person on-rails experience with stages unlocked by progressing through the story and accessed through the friendly ghost Kureha. During these stages, players may be required to either take pictures of ghosts, collect dolls while pursued by a spirit that is frozen when looked at, or keep the Nunchuck still when a ghost suddenly appears.

== Synopsis ==
Siblings Mio and Mayu Amakura visit a woodland soon to be flooded by a dam project; while playing there as children, Mayu fell and permanently injured her leg trying to keep up with a running Mio, leaving their relationship strained. A crimson butterfly leads the twins to Minakami Village, a place said to trap visitors. The two are assaulted by ghosts, including the spirit of Sae Kurosawa who begins influencing Mayu. Years before, Sae and her twin sister Yae were to be sacrifices to pacify a power beneath the village dubbed the "Hellish Abyss"; the ritual involved one twin strangling the other, merging their souls into a crimson butterfly. Yae fled the village, and when Sae was sacrificed alone the Hellish Abyss consumed the village and Sae returned as a powerful vengeful spirit. Sae now seeks to reenact the ritual through Mio and Mayu.

The game has six endings, four of them carried over from the original game and its Xbox port, and two new endings triggered by viewing cutscenes relating to the twins' past. Other unlock conditions include playing the game on different difficulty levels, or completing the final battle within a given time limit. In the original four, Mio can abandon Mayu and escape alone; kill Mayu while in a trance-like state and complete the ritual; banish Sae from Mayu at the cost of being blinded by the Hellish Abyss; or carry Yae's ghost to Sae so they complete the ritual while sparing Mayu. In the two new endings, Mio either accepts dying in the village with Mayu so they can be together forever, or is killed by an insane Mayu after banishing Sae and refusing to complete the ritual.

== Development and release ==
The original Crimson Butterfly, the second entry in the Fatal Frame series, was released for PlayStation 2 in 2003, and ported the following year to Xbox with added story and gameplay content. Following completion of Fatal Frame: Mask of the Lunar Eclipse (2008) for the Wii, which saw extensive gameplay and design changes compared to earlier Fatal Frame titles, series creators Makoto Shibata and Keisuke Kikuchi decided to remake one of the earlier games in the style of Mask of the Lunar Eclipse. The team also had several leftover ideas that were not implemented into Mask of the Lunar Eclipse, allowing the team to also expand upon and improve their new systems using the remake. Production began in 2010 after the team at Tecmo Koei Games had settled on their production goals. Shibata and Kikuchi returned respectively as lead director and producer. Nintendo's Toru Osawa and Toshiharu Izuno were respective co-director and co-producer, and co-programmers. Shibata had previously worked with Osawa and Izuno on Mask of the Lunar Eclipse. The team polished and expanded the "Touch System", where players hold a button to pick up items, to make the experience more unsettling. Due to the change in camera angle, the environment needed to be fully redesigned. The Haunted House mini-game−a series first−was included at Shibata's suggestion, going from a mode with ties to the story to a self-contained bonus mode. Early plans for player-created maps with set scares options was scrapped in favor of random events taking place within preset areas.

The art design was reworked for the remake, with lead characters Mio and Mayu being redesigned as older and less "cute" under Kikuchi's guidance. The redesigns needed to take the camera angle into account, as Mio would not be seen much from the front outside cutscenes. The team also included a new ghost character called Kureha, originally intended as playing a role in mini-games. New music was composed by Riichiro Kuwabara. Tsuki Amano, who created the original Crimson Butterfly ending theme "Chou", returned to create a new ending theme "Kurenai". Amano was not surprised when approached by Shibata, as she both knew of the remake's development well in advance and enjoyed working on the series. She had some trouble creating a new theme, reusing the strong motif from "Chou". She described the song as a "little sister" to the original version's theme.

Kikuchi asked for a new happy ending to be included. Shibata was unable to think up suitable scenarios, so Kikuchi changed his request to a tragic ending. Shibata's concepts were split between the two new endings, dubbed "Shadow Festival" and "Frozen Butterfly". The "Shadow Festival" ending was the happier of the two, as Mio and Mayu were together despite dying in the village. The "Frozen Butterfly" ending, where Mayu goes mad and kills Mio, was intended as the worst possible ending. The "Frozen Butterfly" title referenced a recurring motif in traditional haiku. The CGI cutscenes were created by Shirogumi.

The game was announced in 2010 under the title Zero New Project. It was released in the region on 28 June 2012. The game was localized for PAL regions by Nintendo of Europe, with the characters being dubbed by British actors. The game was released in Australia and New Zealand on 28 June, and in Europe on 29 June. The European version released alongside Spirit Camera, a spin-off for the Nintendo 3DS. It was published in all regions by Nintendo.

== Reception ==
Reception

Aggregate score
Aggregator	Score
Metacritic	77/100

Review scores
Publication	Score
Computer and Video Games	8.9
Eurogamer	7/10
Famitsu	9/10, 8/10, 9/10, 8/10
GameSpot	8.5/10
IGN	8.5/10
Nintendo Life	7/10
Nintendo World Report	8.5/10
Official Nintendo Magazine	72/100
NZGamer	8/10

During its debut week in Japan, Project Zero 2: Wii Edition sold just over 28,000 units, reaching seventh place in game sales charts. The game sold over 46,700 units, becoming the 215th best-selling game in Japan during 2012. The game met with a generally positive reception, with review aggregation website Metacritic giving it a score of 77 out of 100 based on 32 critic reviews.

Japanese gaming magazine Famitsu generally praised its atmosphere and gameplay, and Eurogamer's Johnny Minkley described the game as a welcome return to an earlier style of survival horror compared to Dead Space and later Resident Evil titles. IGN's Maes Hughes was very positive about the gameplay changes and graphical improvements, lauding it as one of the few Wii remakes that was worth getting over the original release. Tom Sykes of Computer and Video Games lauded the new additions and praised the continued horror elements, but disliked the lack of additional gameplay elements. GameSpot, while noting its linear structure and lack of complex puzzles, praised its use of atmosphere and pacing alongside its combat.

Mike Mason of Nintendo Life lauded its atmosphere and gameplay updates, but faulted its controls and an over-reliance on cutscenes that spoiled the horror element built through exploration. Nintendo World Report's Andrew Brown described the remake as "an incredibly fun and spooky experience" despite issues he found with its controls, further praising its translation as superior to the original. Chris Scullion, writing for Official Nintendo Magazine, gave much praise to the environmental design and atmosphere along with its scares. Reagan Morris of NZGamer felt that players would greatly enjoy the remake's gameplay and atmosphere if they could grow accustomed to the controls.

The change in camera perspective was generally praised as improving the game's scares and atmosphere, though some faulted issues with visibility and movement. Some critics praised the adaptation of series mechanics to the Wii controls, but many found them either difficult to adjust to or awkward to play with. The Haunted House minigame was generally seen as an uninteresting addition. When mentioned, the added story elements were appreciated, while the English dub was criticised as poor or out of place.

== Notes and citations ==
Citations

- 零～眞紅の蝶～攻略＆設定資料集 くれなゐの杜 [Zero ～Deep Crimson Butterfly～ Capture & Setting Material Collection Forest of Crimson] (in Japanese). Tecmo Koei Games. 28 September 2012. ISBN 978-4-7758-0852-8.
- "Iwata Asks: Project Zero 2 Wii Edition". Nintendo. 4 April 2012.

Footnotes
