= Kurosawa Station =

Kurosawa Station is the name of multiple train stations in Japan.

- Kurosawa Station (Yokote) in Yokote, Akita Prefecture
- Kurosawa Station (Yurihonjō, Akita) in Yurihonjō, Akita Prefecture
