= Kurosawa (crater) =

Crater on Mercury

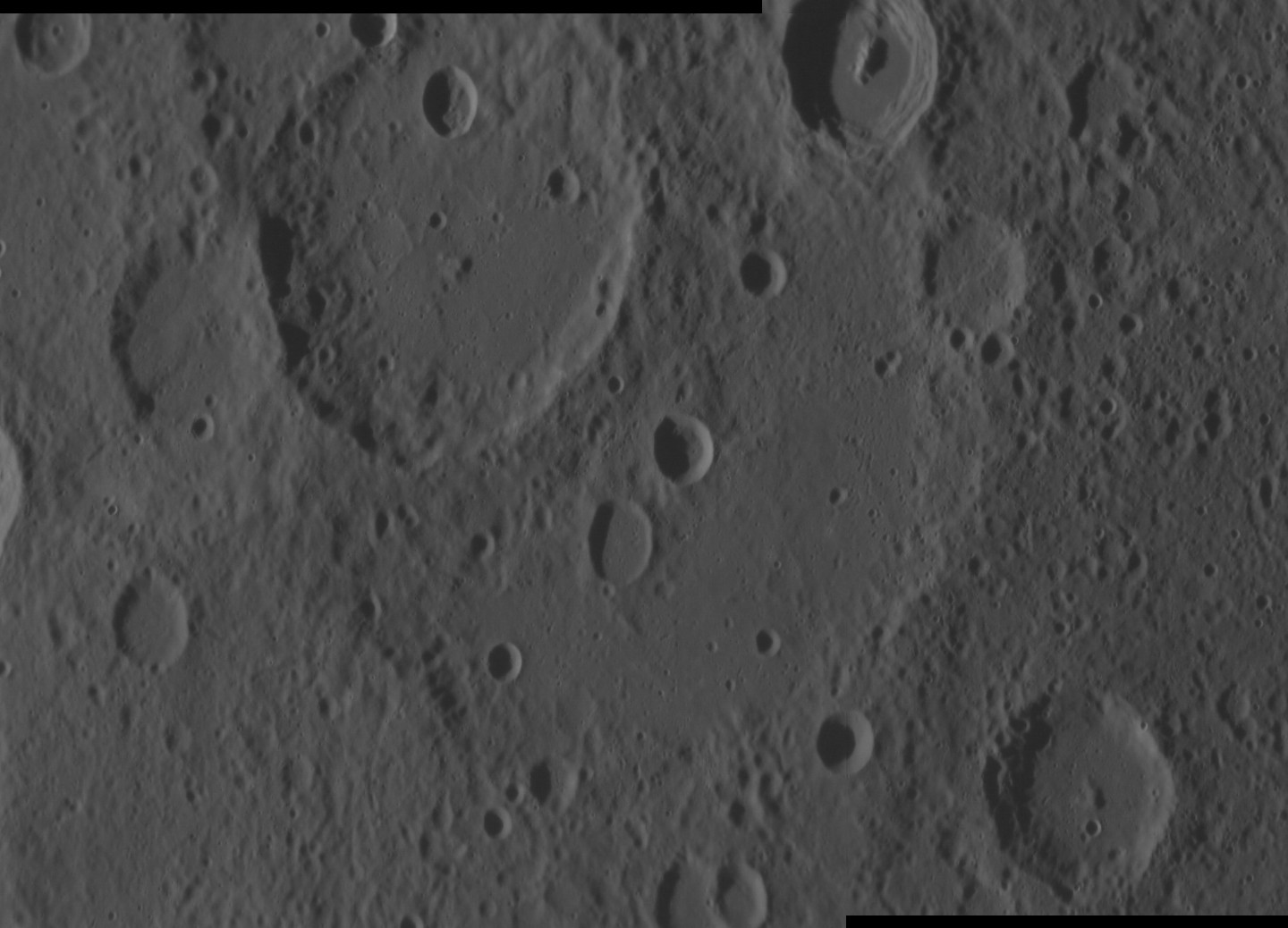
- MESSENGER NAC mosaic of Kurosawa
- Feature type: Impact crater
- Location: Discovery quadrangle, Mercury
- Coordinates: 52.44°S 21.49°W
- Diameter: 152 km (94 mi)
- Eponym: Kinko Kurosawa

Kurosawa is a crater on Mercury. Its name was adopted by the International Astronomical Union (IAU) in 1976. Kurosawa is named for the Japanese composer Kinko Kurosawa, who lived in the 18th century CE.

Kurosawa is ancient and highly eroded by subsequent impacts.

To the north is the crater Sōtatsu. To the west are several faculae or bright areas, including Bitin Facula, Havu Facula, and Sarpa Facula. Other faculae are further to the southwest.
