= Fatal Frame III: The Tormented =

2005 video game

- North American box art featuring lead Rei Kurosawa
- Developer: Tecmo
- Publishers: JP/NA: Tecmo; EU/AU: Take-Two Interactive
- Director: Makoto Shibata
- Producer: Keisuke Kikuchi
- Programmer: Kenishi Asami
- Artists: Hiromi Gyota; Hiroyuki Yazaki; Kiyotaka Sugiyama
- Writers: Makoto Shibata; Tsuyoshi Iuchi
- Composer: Ayako Toyoda
- Series: Fatal Frame
- Platform: PlayStation 2
- Release: JP: July 28, 2005; NA: November 8, 2005; EU: February 24, 2006
- Genre: Survival horror
- Mode: Single-player

Fatal Frame III: The Tormented (Note: Known in Japan as Zero: Shisei no Koe (零(ゼロ) 〜刺青ノ聲〜, lit. Zero: Call of the Tattoo) and in Europe as Project Zero 3: The Tormented) is a survival horror video game developed by Tecmo for the PlayStation 2. The third entry in the Fatal Frame series, it was published by Tecmo in 2005 in Japan and North America, and by Take-Two Interactive in Europe in 2006. Set after the events of the first two games, the story revolves around three characters who lost loved ones and are drawn into the supernatural Manor of Sleep. The gameplay revolves around exploring the Manor and tackling hostile ghosts using the Camera Obscura. Each character has different strengths and weaknesses, such as stronger attack or stealth elements.

Beginning development after Fatal Frame II: Crimson Butterfly (2003), Fatal Frame III was planned as the series' final entry for PS2. Makoto Shibata and Keisuke Kikuchi returned as director and producer, Tsuyoshi Iuchi as lead writer, and Tsuki Amano to write and perform the theme song. The concept and scenario were based on Shibata's nightmares, with the theme of horror emerging from the familiar. Sales met Tecmo's expectations, and it saw positive reviews from journalists. Praise went to its atmosphere and story, but many faulted a lack of innovation in its gameplay.

== Gameplay ==
A typical battle viewed through the lens of the Camera Obscura

Fatal Frame III: The Tormented is a survival horror video game that has players taking control of three different characters−Rei Kurosawa, Miku Hinasaki, and Kei Amakura−who explore the supernatural Manor of Sleep, fighting hostile ghosts using the series' recurring Camera Obscura. The game uses fixed third-person camera angles, with the Camera Obscura using a first-person view.

The game is split between the Manor of Sleep—set in the characters' dreams—and the real world where players control Rei in her apartment. In the real world, Rei researches events assisted by Miku and Kei, with passive ghosts appearing in Rei's apartment later in the game. While in the Manor of Sleep, the goal is to explore its rooms, finding items which can either be used to solve puzzles or reveal aspects of the game's backstory. In addition to standard movement, there is a dedicated run button. Herbs used for healing and film ammunition for the Camera Obscura can be found within the Manor. Character health and the standard film type are restored to default levels upon leaving the Manor of Sleep. Progress is saved either at lanterns within the Manor of Sleep, or in Rei's apartment using the Camera Obscura.

Combat, carried over and expanded from earlier Fatal Frame titles, involves using the Camera Obscura to fight hostile ghosts, with damage being based on distance, the angle of the shot, and current film type. These factors also dictate the number of points awarded for a shot. When the Camera Obscura's lens flashes red with a ghost's attack, the player is given a Shutter Chance, allowing a high damage shot. Within a Shutter Chance, a "Fatal Frame" can be triggered which both increases damage and stuns the ghost. Combat points are used at save points to purchase items, and upgrade the Camera Obscura with lenses that increase damage or add special abilities. Passive ghosts can also be photographed for points, adding them to an in-game album.

Each of the characters have different abilities impacting gameplay. Rei is a balanced character with more upgrade opportunities and a "Flash" to knock ghosts away. Miku has stronger attack power and the ability to slow ghosts temporarily, but cannot use upgraded lenses. She can also explore different areas of the Manor by fitting through small gaps and crawl spaces. Kei has weak attack power, but high health allowing him to survive more hits and the option to hide from some stalking ghosts. He can also move heavy objects to open new paths.

== Synopsis ==
After surviving a car crash which killed her fiancé Yuu Asou, freelance photographer Rei Kurosawa remains in mourning for him and takes to photographing reportedly-haunted locations. She is assisted by her flatmate Miku Hinasaki, who lost her brother Mafuyu to supernatural events. (Note: As depicted in the normal ending of Fatal Frame) While photographing the ruin of Kuze Shrine, Rei sees a vision of Yuu and follows him into a place later dubbed the Manor of Sleep. After encountering the hostile ghost of a tattooed woman, Rei returns to reality. That night she dreams of the Manor of Sleep, waking up with a tattoo growing across her body. She begins investigating Kuze Shrine with the help of Miku and Kei Amakura, a friend of Yuu and uncle to Mio who lost her sister Mayu. (Note: As depicted in the "Crimson Butterfly" ending of Fatal Frame II: Crimson Butterfly)

It is revealed that Kuze Shrine was the site of a ritual where a chosen priestess received tattoos emblematic of a person's grief, eventually being impaled in a sacred chamber so her spirit would carry the grief into the afterlife. The last priestess, Reika, was in love with a previous priestess's child Kaname and volunteered for the role as she thought him dead from an earthquake. When Kaname visited her after the ritual to comfort her, he was murdered by the Kuze Shrine high priestess for his trespass, causing the tattoos' power to overwhelm Reika and destroy the Kuze Shrine. Reika now haunts the dreams of those who lost loved ones, luring them deeper into the Manor of Sleep, a manifestation of Kuze Shrine. Those who are drawn to the Manor's heart die in reality and turn to ash.

Miku is drawn by Mafuyu's spirit into the Manor, falling into a coma. Kei initially believes the ritual failed and attempts to reapply it in the dream, only to be confronted by Reika. Rei reaches the heart of the Manor of Sleep and pacifies Reika, sending her and Kaname into the afterlife. This lifts the curse and allows the spirits trapped in the Manor of Sleep to depart. Yuu appears and takes the tattoo curse from Rei before passing on. Both Rei and Miku wake from the dream, deciding to continue living despite the pain of their losses. Depending on whether a set of key items is found in the Manor of Sleep on a second playthrough, Kei either succumbs to the curse, or wakes with Mio and introduces her to Rei and Miku.

== Development ==
Fatal Frame III was developed by series creator Tecmo. Makoto Shibata and Keisuke Kikuchi returned respectively as director and producer, while Kenishi Asami acted as lead programmer. Shibata created the concept for Fatal Frame III as production was ending on Fatal Frame II: Crimson Butterfly (2003), based around the concept of a more intense kind of horror. As the PlayStation 3 would soon release, Shibata made Fatal Frame III the final PlayStation 2 entry, rounding out the games up to that point as a trilogy. The game's theme was fear emerging from everyday normality, with a dream-based location adding beauty into the setting. As with earlier entries, Shibata drew inspiration from the Japanese horror movie Ring and Daijiro Morohoshi's manga Yōkai Hunter. The concept of dreams also tied into Japanese creatures based around dreams such as the baku. The team researched unspecified ancient Japanese beliefs to believably portray its themes and supernatural events.

Looking for something the team had not done before, Kikuchi created the design theme of "interactive fear", showing the protagonist's growing fear as the curse's details are revealed. He also wanted to explore different types of fear and gameplay through the multiple characters. The real world-based dual location had also not been done before. The gameplay of each character was designed from the dual perspectives of their appearance and potential gameplay use. The number of ghost battles was reduced, but their difficulty and complexity was increased, wanting to portray a location entirely controlled by ghosts. Ghost behaviour was a combination of that implemented in the first two games, with both ghost movement and ghosts vanishing being implemented to challenge players. Kikuchi felt that the team had managed to include all their planned concepts for Fatal Frame III in the final product.

The story was written by Shibata and Tsuyoshi Iuchi. Iuchi wrote the game script, reprising his role from the first two games. Shibata drew inspiration from his nightmares when creating the setting, including a specific dream about a haunted mansion filled with the spirits of dead loved ones. The horror theme was also meant to be "indigenous" as opposed to the fantastic threats in earlier entries. Due to the theme of suffering and the presence of the tattoo, a more mature heroine was chosen as the lead. Fatal Frame III acted as a sequel to the two previous game, though its story was also written to be understandable to series newcomers. Kei was included based on fan requests for a male protagonist. While earlier games ended in tragedy, Fatal Frame III was written to start with the worst possible situation and end with a positive resolution. While writing the ending, Shibata chose for Rei to live while remembering Yuu, as death would be a betrayal of the memories of Yuu and those she meets in the Manor of Sleep. This approach was inspired by a tanka by Japanese writer Kyoko Inaba. The ending where Rei, Miku and Kei all survive is considered the canon ending. Shibata's original ending draft was thirteen minutes long, and he was forced to trim it down into the final version.

Rei was designed to be more mature than earlier Fatal Frame protagonists while retaining their established slender style. Her role as a photographer also salvaged a discarded plan for the first game of having a professional photographer as protagonist. Miku's design did not change much from the first game, being altered to show her growing maturity. Kei's design was based on his personality as being unlucky with women and stealth-based gameplay abilities. The key color for the game was blue, with the Japanese character for it being incorporated into the title as a double-meaning. The engine was improved, allowing for more detailed environments and ghost designs to increase the sense of fear for players. The CGI cutscenes were created by Polygon Pictures.

=== Music ===
The music was composed by Ayako Toyoda. Unlike the first two games, there was no music created for the haunted location, instead using ambient and environmental sounds. Music was mostly reserved for the real world locations, though it remained dark and unsettling. One piece of music used in the Manor of Sleep was a lullaby performed by child actress Miyū Tsuzurahara, who also voiced the child ghosts. The theme song "Voice" was written and performed by Japanese singer Tsuki Amano, who had previously sung the vocal theme for Crimson Butterfly. Shibata decided from the outset to bring Amano back, having used her album Meg & Lion as background music while writing, though other singers were considered. Shibata wanted a song that would fit the game's ending, describing it as an amalgamation of Amano's work up to that point. Amano had started creating the song under the name "Tattoo" before being contacted, and during the writing process altered the song to better fit the game and renamed it "Voice". She based the song around moving on from grief, with a close friend having lost her fiancée in real life. There was a slight mismatch between the lyrics focusing on moving on and Shibata's wish for a song about remembrance, which caused friction between Amano and Shibata that Kikuchi needed to resolve.

== Release ==
Fatal Frame III was announced in Japan in March 2005 in an issue of Japanese magazine Famitsu, then under the title Zero: Rei. At this time, it was said to be 60% complete. The game was released in Japan under the title Zero: Shisei no Koe on July 28, 2005. Kikuchi chose a summer release to coincide with Japan's traditional ghost story season. As with other entries, the game was not numbered in Japan. Beginning in May, a pre-order bonus campaign offered a DVD containing summaries of the first two Fatal Frame titles. Two guidebooks were published for the game by Enterbrain that same year; the first on July 28, and the second on October 7 which included behind-the-scenes material on the story and characters. "Voice" was released both as a single, and as part of Amano's album A Moon Child In The Sky on September 21, 2005, by Pony Canyon. Tecmo published the game in North America as Fatal Frame III: The Tormented on November 8, 2005. In Europe, the game was published by Take-Two Interactive as Project Zero 3: The Tormented on February 24, 2006. While previous titles were ported to the Xbox with additional content, no plans were made to port Fatal Frame III. An emulated version for the PlayStation 3 was released as a PlayStation 2 Classic on October 2, 2013, in North America.

== Reception ==
Reception

Aggregate score
Aggregator	Score
Metacritic	78/100

Review scores
Publication	Score
1Up.com	B
Electronic Gaming Monthly	6.5/10, 7.5/10, 7/10
Eurogamer	8/10
Famitsu	35/40
GameSpot	7.6/10
GameSpy	4/5
IGN	7.8/10

In Japan during its opening week, Fatal Frame III debuted in fifth place in Japanese sales charts. The game sold over 69,000 units by the end of 2005, ranking among the top 200 best-selling games for that period. In their fiscal report published in February 2006, Tecmo said the game performed within their expectations.

Japanese gaming magazine Famitsu gave extensive praise to the story's tone and atmosphere, while Electronic Gaming Monthly enjoyed the setting but found the story weak. Kristan Reed of Eurogamer positively noted the resolution of plot threads from earlier entries, while GameSpot's Bethany Massimilla found the story engaging and felt the theme carried the story despite there being too many plot threads for comfort. Bryan Stratton of GameSpy enjoyed the story's pacing and tone. IGN's Jeremy Dunham praised the clearer narrative compared to Crimson Butterfly, noting how each character's personality was incorporated into gameplay.

Massimilla enjoyed the tone set by the visuals, and Electronic Gaming Monthly lauded the graphic design as contributing to the atmosphere, Sharkey, echoing his sentiments on gameplay, noted a lack of graphical improvement over the previous two entries. Dunham praised both the environmental designs, and the design and expressive faces of the characters. The music and sound design met with general praise.

Electronic Gaming Monthly found the gameplay and scares enjoyable, but noted repetitive level design. Massimilla appreciated the improvements to combat, but faulted the cumbersome controls. Stratton felt the gameplay made too much use of established elements and tedious puzzle solving, a sentiment echoed and compared by Reed to the repeated gameplay structure of earlier Resident Evil games. 1Up.com's Scott Sharkey again noted a lack of innovations from earlier entries, having little to say on the gameplay due to this. Dunham enjoyed the combat with ghosts, but noted that the controls and puzzle design were too archaic for easy enjoyment. Several reviewers also noted its increased difficulty.
