= Fatal Frame: Mask of the Lunar Eclipse =

2008 video game

- Wii cover art featuring the character Ruka Minazuki
- Developers: Tecmo; Nintendo SPD; Grasshopper Manufacture
- Publishers: Nintendo (Wii); Koei Tecmo
- Directors: Makoto Shibata; Goichi Suda
- Producers: Keisuke Kikuchi; Toru Osawa
- Artists: Takashi Ito; Kazuma Norisada; Yasuo Inoue; Sawaki Takeyasu
- Writers: Makoto Shibata; Masahiro Yuki; Goichi Suda
- Composers: Masafumi Takada; Etsuko Ichikawa
- Series: Fatal Frame
- Platforms: Wii; Nintendo Switch; PlayStation 4; PlayStation 5; Windows; Xbox One; Xbox Series X/S
- Release: Wii: JP: July 31, 2008; Nintendo Switch, PlayStation 4, PlayStation 5, Windows, Xbox One, Xbox Series X/S: WW: March 9, 2023
- Genre: Survival horror
- Mode: Single-player

Fatal Frame: Mask of the Lunar Eclipse (Note: Known in Japan as Zero: Tsukihami no Kamen (Japanese: 零(ゼロ) 〜月蝕(つきはみ)の仮面(かめん)〜) and in Europe as Project Zero: Mask of the Lunar Eclipse.) is a 2008 survival horror video game developed by Tecmo, Nintendo SPD and Grasshopper Manufacture and published by Nintendo for the Wii. It is the fourth installment in the Fatal Frame series and the first on a Nintendo console. Initially released only in Japan, a remaster for eighth and ninth generation consoles and Windows published by Koei Tecmo was released worldwide in 2023. The story focuses on three characters investigating the abandoned and haunted Rogetsu Island: Ruka Minazuki and Misaki Asou, two girls who were involved in a secret ritual and suffered amnesia as a result, and Choshiro Kirishima, the detective who rescued them. The gameplay, as with previous entries in the series, revolves around the main character exploring environments and tackling hostile ghosts using the Camera Obscura.

The idea for Mask of the Lunar Eclipse came to series co-creator Keisuke Kikuchi when he first saw the Wii hardware. Kikuchi and series co-creator Makoto Shibata returned as respective producer and director, while Grasshopper Manufacture's Goichi Suda acted as co-director, co-writer and designer. The addition of further developers to the project enabled the team to reconsider the standard formula, although it proved to be a chaotic experience. Tsuki Amano returned to create the game's ending themes. The Wii release became the best-selling title in the series up to that point, and was praised by Japanese and Western critics for its atmosphere and mechanics while being mixed on its controls. The remaster also saw strong sales, but was met with mixed reviews due to the age of some gameplay elements while praising the scenario and art design.

== Gameplay ==
A ghost viewed through the Camera Obscura, showing it struck by a "Fatal Frame" shot

Fatal Frame: Mask of the Lunar Eclipse is a survival horror video game that has players taking control of four different characters navigating a variety of different environments, including traditional Japanese houses and a Meiji-era sanatorium-turned-hotel, while facing hostile ghosts through photography using the series' recurring Camera Obscura. In the original version, third-person navigation and first-person control of in-game weapons such as the Camera Obscura are controlled using the Wii Remote and Nuchuck. The 2023 remaster reworks these for each console's controls. During exploration, the characters are regularly attacked by hostile spirits, who take away the characters' health through touch.

The two central characters can fight off and defeat spirits using the Camera Obscura. Shots taken by the Camera Obscura deal varying amounts of damage based on how close the ghost is, the angle of the shot, and the film used. These factors are taken together to determine how many points the player is awarded for a shot. The most damaging type of shot is the "Fatal Frame", which is achieved if a shot is taken when the ghost is attacking. Points are used as the in-game currency, which can be used at save points to purchase items such as medicine and other items. Blue gems scattered around the environment can be used to upgrade the Camera Obscura, with some upgrades speeding reload time or enabling shots to deal more damage. Types of film range from an unlimited low-quality film that deals little damage to rarer and more powerful film types.

In addition to the Camera Obscura, the third character can use a flashlight to explore their surroundings, and one character has access to a special Spirit Flashlight, which uses moonlight to pacify spirits. Should a ghost attack, gestures with the Wii Remote can shake them off. The "New Game+" mode unlocks additional costumes and further items and upgrades, many of them dependent on how much the player has scored during the initial playthrough. On higher difficulties, the number of items available is reduced.

== Synopsis ==
In the 1970s, ten years prior to the start of the game, suspected serial killer Yō Haibara kidnapped five girls from their rooms in a sanatorium on Rogetsu, an island south of Honshu. The girls were rescued from a cavern beneath the sanatorium by detective Choshiro Kirishima, who had been pursuing Haibara, but they had all lost their memories. Two years later, a catastrophe strikes Rogetsu Island which kills off the inhabitants. Eight years later, in the present, two of the rescued girls have died in mysterious circumstances and two of the survivors, Misaki Asou and Madoka Tsukimori, return to discover the truth about their pasts. Despite being warned by her mother not to return to the island, fellow survivor Ruka Minazuki goes there to find Misaki and Madoka. Shortly before Ruka's arrival, Madoka is killed by hostile spirits. Choshiro also returns to the island at the request of Ruka's mother Sayaka, intending to both find Ruka and continue his pursuit of Haibara.

During their explorations, the characters learn that the island once used a ritual to send spirits to the afterlife during a decennial lunar eclipse, which countered a supernatural disease called Moonlight Syndrome, (Note: Getsuyuubyou (月幽病; lit. "Getsuyuu Syndrome") in Japanese, "Luna Sedata Syndrome" in fan translation.) which affects memories and identity. An earlier failed ritual which triggered a mass outbreak of Moonlight Syndrome caused many elements to be forbidden, including the ritual dancer's mask dubbed the Mask of the Lunar Eclipse, and the melody "Tsukimori" that survived through Ruka's family. By 1970, a kagura was used in its place and became a tourist attraction, although Moonlight Syndrome was a continuing problem. Ruka and Misaki were among the infected treated at the sanatorium with Haibara's spiritually sensitive sister Sakuya. It was decided to conduct a new ritual, with Ruka's father Soya Yomotsuki crafting a new Mask of the Lunar Eclipse. Sakuya was the lead dancer wearing the mask, with Ruka, Misaki, Madoka and the two other girls taking part.

Due to lacking "Tsukimori", the ritual was a failure. Sakuya reached the final stage of the disease and fell into a coma while shattering the mask, the other girls collapsed and suffered amnesia, and the kagura dancers all died. Two years after the girls were rescued and left the island, Sakuya woke up and infected the whole island, killing everyone including Yomotsuki. Misaki―a descendent of the Camera Obscura's creator―was drawn back to Rogetsu by the spirit of a doll given to her by Sakuya. Choshiro is also revealed to have died that day, killing the fleeing Haibara after being fatally stabbed.

To lay Sakuya to rest and calm Rogetsu's dead before their influence spreads beyond the island, the ritual must be completed. Ruka comes into possession of all the mask fragments, which reform into the complete Mask of the Lunar Eclipse. Confronting Sakuya atop Rogetsu's lighthouse, she manages to pacify her with "Tsukimori", then Choshiro puts the mask on Sakuya, completing the ritual and allowing the island's spirits to pass into the afterlife including Sakuya, Choshiro and Yomotsuki. Depending on the game's difficulty setting, Misaki's fate is either left unknown, or she is saved by Madoka's spirit and leaves the island.

== Development ==
Mask of the Lunar Eclipse was co-developed by Tecmo, Grasshopper Manufacture and Nintendo Software Planning & Development. Tecmo was in charge of the gameplay and atmosphere, Grasshopper Manufacture were put in charge of character motion and other unspecified aspects of development, while Nintendo managed general production. Makoto Shibata and Keisuke Kikuchi, series creators and respective director and producer of the previous games in the series, returned to their respective posts. In addition, Grasshopper Manufacture's Goichi Suda acted as a co-director, co-writer and designer. Suda was initially reluctant to work on the project due to his intense dislike for ghosts and horror games. According to a later interview with Kikuchi, he was first inspired when he saw the potential in the Wii hardware, and was the first to propose the project to Nintendo. The main development goal for Mask of the Lunar Eclipse was "feeling fear with [the player's] body", with gameplay functions closely tied into the Wii hardware. Among these were feeding sounds through the Wii remote's speaker and creating effects using the rumble function. An adjustment they made was to the camera perspective: while it had been placed at a distance in previous games, it was shifted to an over-the-shoulder third-person view so the control of the torch was more realistic. This raised concerns as to the pace of the character's movement. Taking into account similar criticisms from fans of earlier games, the characters' speed was increased. This aspect was undergoing revision until quite late into development. The CGI scenes were created by Shirogumi.

When designing the game's main setting, the team moved away from the traditional enclosed Japanese mansions from previous games in favor of somewhere that blended Eastern and Western architectural tastes to create different gameplay opportunities, described in-game as a Meiji-era hotel. Traditional mansion settings were also included, with more locations being present than in previous games. The color yellow was chosen as the game's image color, while the key words used to describe the plot were "memory", "moon" and "mask". The subtitle refers to the mask that is key to the Kagura Dance Ritual. The mask in turn tied into story themes of the phases of the moon, the nature of memory, and music. During development, Shibata and Kikuchi felt that Grasshopper and Nintendo's involvement helped them reevaluate the series formula and try out new things. After development, Kikuchi said that the three companies' varying ideas on the project made the development "a complete and utter mess", though it ultimately worked out well. The characters were designed by Sawaki Takeyasu, who had previously worked in that capacity on Ōkami. The music was composed by Masafumi Takada and Etsuko Ichikawa. As with the previous two games, Mask of the Lunar Eclipse features songs by Japanese singer Tsuki Amano: the theme song "Zero Tuning", and the ending theme "Noise".

== Release ==
Mask of the Lunar Eclipse was first revealed in January 2008 at a Tecmo press conference. It was the first series title to be developed and released for a Nintendo console. It was released on July 31. Its release was timed to coincide with a traditional time in Japan for people to tell each other ghost stories. Upon release, several bugs affecting player progress through the game were discovered, and were revealed in a message to fans from Nintendo. While no North American release was planned, a European release was in the works and was leaked via a brief mention in a French gaming magazine. After the leak, Nintendo stated that a European release had been planned, but since then the localization had been cancelled. No other third-party publisher besides Nintendo would publish the game overseas, leaving Mask of the Lunar Eclipse a Japan-exclusive title for the time being.

After Nintendo's announcement, a three-person team decided to create a fan translation of the game. The development process was compared by them to "a Frankenstein's monster", referring to how they needed to assess the data, construct a development schedule for the translation patch, theorize on the file structure, and then create a tool to access the game's data files. The modification program was then tested on Super Smash Bros. Brawl by a dedicated tester, then sent back for refinement. They worked hard to preserve the atmosphere of the original game, along with attempting to make the translation as true as possible to the original without being overly verbose. To help translate the text, they posted the script in segments on internet forums, though access to the work was later restricted due to quality concerns. During this time, they found several competent translators who were able to complete the final 20% of the script translation. It took several months for the entire process of extracting text, translation, then patching in the translated text to be completed. The patch ended up being quite large as the game designers had split the game into hundreds of different data archives, and suitable accommodations and adjustments needed to be made. The fan translation was released on January 19, 2010. The patch was designed to work on any Wii device, bypassing the console's region locking, and included a newly made costume for the main character.

Prior to Western release, the game was commonly dubbed "Fatal Frame / Project Zero IV" or "Fatal Frame / Project Zero: Mask of the Lunar Eclipse" by journalists. A Western release was eventually announced in September 2022 by Koei Tecmo for Nintendo Switch, PlayStation 4, PlayStation 5, Windows, Xbox One and Xbox Series X/S. This version is a remaster that includes updated graphics and new unlockable costumes. As with earlier releases, the game was given the title Fatal Frame in North America, and Project Zero in Europe. The remaster and worldwide release were inspired by the success of a remaster of the fifth Fatal Frame title, Maiden of Black Water in 2021. The game was released on March 9, 2023; in Japan the PS4 and Switch versions received both physical and digital releases, while the game was released as a digital exclusive in the rest of the world. The game was available as both a standard edition and a Digital Deluxe Edition including a digital artbook and soundtrack. Pre-order bonuses included in-game costumes, while another in-game accessory was unlocked if a save from Maiden of Black Water was detected. Details on the localized settings and characters were released in December 2022.

== Reception ==
Wii reception

Review scores
Publication	Score
Edge	8/10
Eurogamer	7/10
Famitsu	8/10, 9/10, 9/10, 8/10
Nintendo Life	8/10

During its debut for the Wii, Mask of the Lunar Eclipse sold approximately 33,000 units. As of the end of December 2008, the game had sold nearly 75,000 units. While these were low sales compared to other Wii titles, it made Mask of the Lunar Eclipse the best-selling title in the series to that date. The remaster sold 120,000 units worldwide between its release of 9 March 2023 and by the end of Koei Tecmo's fiscal year on 31 March 2023.

The reviewers for Famitsu were united in their opinion that, while not a revolutionary title within the series, it was a high-quality game. Eurogamer's Kristan Reed regularly noted its similarity to previous entries in the series, praising the atmosphere and gameplay, while criticizing the control scheme and its negative effect on combat and navigation. In a preview of the game, Richard Eisenbeis of Kotaku praised the game's multiple storylines and settings, but was mixed about its familiar gameplay and again criticized the controls. In closing, he generally cited it as a good entry in the series. Matthew Blundon of Nintendo Life, echoing the criticism of the controls, said that it would please hardcore horror game players. Albert Lichi of Cubed3 again faulted the control set up. In most other respects he was highly positive, praising the story, combat and graphics, calling it a "labor of love" on the part of the development team. In its import review, Edge generally enjoyed the unsettling atmosphere that the developers had succeeded in creating by using the dark settings and close-set camera angle. The reviewer also defended the often-criticized control scheme, saying that it added to the feeling of fear. In closing, the reviewer said that the subtlety of the game showed the flaws in other horror franchises such as Silent Hill.

Remaster reception

Aggregate scores
Aggregator	Score
Metacritic	(NS) 73/100 (PC) 69/100 (PS5) 67/100 (XSXS) 64/100
OpenCritic	38% recommend (Note: Based on 74 reviews)

Review scores
Publication	Score
Destructoid	7.5/10
Hardcore Gamer	4/5
Nintendo Life	6/10
Nintendo World Report	(NS) 7/10
Push Square	(PS5) 6/10
Video Games Chronicle	2/5

The remaster received "mixed or average" reviews across all platforms, according to review aggregator website Metacritic. Zoey Handley of Destructoid felt that the game had an audience due to its atmosphere and gameplay, but noted that the story presentation and elements of its combat and controls had not aged well. Reviewing the Switch version, Nintendo Life's Ollie Reynolds felt that the game's combat and design dated it for modern fans, but praised the narrative and art design of the environments and ghosts. Fran Soto of Hardcore Gamer enjoyed the game and felt it worked better on new hardware with analog control than it did with the original Wii hardware, but noted its slow character movement and issues with the camera controls. Push Square's John Cal McCormick likewise faulted the slow movement, additionally faulting repetitive combat and a "clunky" feel, but praised its updated graphics and atmosphere. Joe DeVader of Nintendo World Report felt that its control issues and overall design were better suited to series fans than newcomers, but enjoyed the atmosphere and praised the graphical upgrade. Chris Scullion, writing for Video Games Chronicle, echoed recurring complaints around the movement speed while praising the atmosphere and gameplay design.
