= Fatal Frame II: Crimson Butterfly =

2003 video game

- North American PlayStation 2 cover
- Developer: Tecmo
- Publishers: JP/NA: Tecmo; PAL: Ubisoft (PS2); EU: Microsoft Game Studios (Xbox)
- Director: Makoto Shibata
- Producer: Keisuke Kikuchi
- Programmer: Katsuyuki Okura
- Writers: Tsuyoshi Iuchi; Makoto Shibata
- Composer: Ayako Toyoda
- Series: Fatal Frame
- Platforms: PlayStation 2; Xbox
- Release: PlayStation 2: JP: November 27, 2003; NA: December 9, 2003; EU: April 30, 2004; Xbox: NA: November 1, 2004; JP: November 11, 2004; EU: February 4, 2005
- Genre: Survival horror
- Mode: Single-player

Fatal Frame II: Crimson Butterfly (Note: Known in Japan as Zero ~Akai Chō~ (零 〜紅い蝶〜; lit. "Zero ~Crimson Butterfly~") and in Europe as Project Zero II: Crimson Butterfly) is a survival horror video game developed by Tecmo for PlayStation 2. The second entry in the Fatal Frame series, it was published by Tecmo in 2003 in Japan and North America, and by Ubisoft in Europe in 2004. An expanded Xbox port was published in 2004 in Japan and North America, and by Microsoft Game Studios in Europe in 2005. The story follows sisters Mio and Mayu Amakura as they are trapped in a ghost-filled village cursed by a failed ritual which they are being forced to re-enact. Gameplay follows Mio as she explores the village searching for Mayu, fighting hostile ghosts using the series' recurring Camera Obscura.

Crimson Butterfly began development shortly after the original game released in 2001, with returning staff including director Makoto Shibata, producer Keisuke Kikuchi, and writer Tsuyoshi Iuchi. The aim was to both refine the gameplay mechanics of the original and to create a compelling narrative to encourage players to finish the game. Singer-songwriter Tsukiko Amano created the game's theme song "Chō". Crimson Butterfly was praised by critics for its narrative and gameplay, later being called a classic of the survival horror genre. A sequel, Fatal Frame III: The Tormented, was released in 2005. Two remakes were released: Project Zero 2: Wii Edition (2012) for the Wii, and Fatal Frame II: Crimson Butterfly Remake (2026) for multiple platforms.

== Gameplay ==
A ghost encounter in Fatal Frame II: Crimson Butterfly

Fatal Frame II: Crimson Butterfly is a survival horror video game in which players take on the role of Mio Amakura as she explores the haunted Minakami (All Gods) Village. The gameplay involves Mio exploring Minakami Village, either in company with or searching for her sister Mayu, with brief sections where players control Mayu. The village is explored from a fixed third-person camera perspective, with the view switching to first-person when Mio uses the Camera Obscura, the game's main weapon. The goal is to explore the village, solving puzzles by photographing objects and entering combat with ghosts which inhabit Minakami Village. When Mayu accompanies Mio, she can help find puzzle clues, but ghosts can attack her. Puzzles include riddles that must be solved with clues and time-based roadblocks.

The presence of ghosts is indicated with a filament; a blue light shows friendly ghosts which can be photographed as a collectable, while a red light indicates a hostile ghost. Combat involves Mio using the Camera Obscura to fight ghosts, with taking pictures with the camera dealing damage and requiring the player to keep the ghost in frame; waiting for the ghost to be mid-attack will allow for a high damage shot. The most powerful shot is the "Shutter Chance", a critical attack activated when the camera display goes red. Within a Shutter Chance, a "Fatal Frame" opportunity can allow multiple shots to be chained for greater damage. When Mayu accompanies her, ghosts will also attack her. If they deal too much damage to either Mio or Mayu, the game ends and must be restarted from a previous save. The camera can be upgraded using points earned by taking photos, or using Spirit Orbs dropped by defeated ghosts or found around the village.

== Synopsis ==
Twins Mio and Mayu Amakura visit a forested valley in the Minakami region where they used to play as children, which will shortly be flooded due to a new dam project. Due to a crippling leg injury suffered by Mayu indirectly caused by the younger Mio, the twins are very close but suffer a strained relationship. Mayu is led away by a crimson butterfly, with Mio giving chase and the two ending up in Minakami Village, a legendary location said to trap people who enter it. The two search for a way out, finding Minakami Village haunted by hostile ghosts. Mayu is frequently separated from Mio, led by crimson butterflies deeper into the village and eventually becoming possessed by the spirit of a girl called Sae Kurosawa. Mio is helped by Itsuki Tachibana, a friendly spirit who mistakes her for Sae's sister Yae. Yae also appears within the village, and appears to influence Mio's actions. The village's history is revealed through documents and flashbacks Mio experiences from the ghosts.

Minakami Village was built over a gate to the underworld dubbed the Hellish Abyss, and used a ritual to placate it; one of a set of twins strangled the other, supposedly reuniting their souls into one being and appeasing the Abyss. After several failed rituals, Yae and Sae were the only remaining twins in Minakami Village. Itsuki, a survivor of an earlier ritual, sought to help them escape, sending for help from a friend outside the village, Ryozo, who visited with his folklorist teacher Seijiro Makabe. The villagers used Seijiro as a stopgap sacrifice dubbed the "Kusabe", though Ryozo escaped. When Itsuki tried to help Yae and Sae escape, Sae let herself be captured so they could perform the sacrifice and be "together forever", but Yae ran. Itsuki killed himself in despair at Sae's capture, and the villagers sacrificed Sae alone. This caused the ritual's failure, consuming Minakami Village and causing Sae and Seijiro to return as vengeful spirits. Mio, learning that according to the village's customs she will kill Mayu, attempts to flee. Sae captures Mayu, intent on seeing the ritual completed as she sees herself and Yae reflected in Mio and Mayu.

The story has multiple endings based on different actions. Mio can choose to abandon Mayu, causing her to be attacked by Sae and waking up in the real world without Mayu, resulting in a game over. If Mio follows Mayu, the sisters are led through the sacred pathways by Sae and Yae respectively, with Mio fighting Seijiro before reaching the Hellish Abyss. With both sisters in a trance, Mio strangles Mayu, completing the ritual and bringing peace to Minakami Village as Mayu's spirit becomes a crimson butterfly. Mio is later seen with a red mark on her neck representing Mayu's spirit. (Note: Treated as the canon ending in Fatal Frame III: The Tormented) Completing the game on hard mode unlocks a new fight with Sae, which allows Mio to rescue Mayu; due to looking into the Hellish Abyss in the process, Mio is permanently blinded.

== Development ==
Production on Crimson Butterfly began at series developer Tecmo shortly after completion of the original game in 2001. Makoto Shibata and Keisuke Kikuchi returned respectively as director and producer. While the basic gameplay was carried over from the first game, it underwent adjustments and additions. They also sought to balance the game difficulty, as feedback had indicated the original was either too easy or too hard. The camera angle was being adjusted up until release, and anything that would obscure the player character was removed. The CGI cutscenes were handled by Daisuke Inari, who described the task of balancing the horror elements with Japanese-inspired beauty as "a mind-boggling challenge". He used reference material from Shibata to achieve the desired atmosphere. Production ran parallel to the Xbox port of the original game, with Kikuchi choosing the early staff to "push the envelop" of the proposed gameplay. After completing other projects, the full staff were pulled back together to finish development.

Based on feedback that the first game was too scary for some players to complete, the team decided to create an interesting storyline. The scenario was inspired by a dream by Shibata which he described as having a complete plot and ending he just needed to make work as a video game. Tsuyoshi Iuchi returned from the first game as script writer. The story was based around the symmetry of twins and butterflies, with the game's horror coming from the loss or injury of one half of a whole, and its drama coming from contrasts between pairs. Kikuchi cited the stories of Seishi Yokomizo, and both Japanese and Western horror movies as inspiration for Crimson Butterfly. Kikuchi specifically referenced The Shining, his favorite film, as a great inspiration. They additionally drew inspiration from legends, folklore, and unspecified natural disasters. As with the original game, female leads were chosen to emphasize the protagonists' weakness and elicit player sympathy.

The game featured a theme song by singer-songwriter Tsukiko Amano titled "Chō". In the middle of production, Kikuta voiced his wish for a theme song, and Shibata suggested they approach singer-songwriter Tsukiko Amano after hearing her debut single "Hakoniwa". Amano, a video game fan, accepted the offer before knowing the genre of Crimson Butterfly. She was provided with concept art and a plot synopsis to help her work. Amano described her feelings about the lyrics as being from Mayu's perspective losing Mio. The image in her mind when writing the lyrics was a butterfly losing its wing.

== Release ==
The game was announced by Tecmo in May 2003 at that year's E3. It was published in Japan on November 27, 2003 under the title Zero ~Akai Chō~. The game was promoted with a free DVD distributed through gaming stores in October, and supplemented with a novel in December telling an alternate version of the game's story. The game released by Tecmo in North America on December 9 using the "Fatal Frame" title. Ubisoft announced in January 2004 that it would publish the game in PAL regions, releasing the game as Project Zero 2: Crimson Butterfly in Europe on April 30. An emulated version for the PlayStation 3 was released as a PlayStation 2 Classic on May 7, 2013 in North America.

As the original version was nearing completion, Kikuchi began creating plans for an expanded port for the Xbox, similar to the original game. The port included updated graphics, a first person camera option, a new harder difficulty mode, new costumes for Mio and Mayu, and a new ending. When creating the first person mode, which was intended to make the game more frightening, Kikuchi used Halo: Combat Evolved as a reference. The new ending "Promise", in which Yae reaches Sae to complete the ritual and spare Mio and Mayu, was intended as a truly happy ending for the twins. The Xbox port first released in North America on November 1, 2004. In Japan, the game released on November 11 using the American title, with pre-orders including a fan disc featuring behind the scenes information and promotional trailers. In Europe the port was published by Microsoft Game Studios, releasing on February 4, 2005.

== Reception ==
Reception

Aggregate score
| Aggregator | Score | |
| Aggregator | PS2 | Xbox |
|---|---|---|
| Metacritic | 81/100 (40 reviews) | 84/100 (37 reviews) |

Review scores
| Publication | Score | |
| Publication | PS2 | Xbox |
|---|---|---|
| Computer and Video Games | | 8/10 |
| Eurogamer | 8/10 | 9/10 |
| Famitsu | 33/40 | |
| Game Informer | 9/10 | 9.25/10 |
| GameSpot | 8.2/10 | 8.3/10 |
| GameSpy | 4/5 | 4.5/5 |
| IGN | 8.5/10 | 8.4/10 |
| X-Play | 4/5 | |

Crimson Butterfly debuted as the tenth best-selling during its release week in Japan, going on to sell over 64,400 units by the end of 2003. The Xbox version, despite critical acclaim, failed to break into the top-selling games in the UK. The PSN re-release was the best-selling title in the North American Classics category during October 2013.

Crimson Butterfly met with positive reviews from video game journalists. Review aggregation website Metacritic gave the PS2 version a score of 81 out of 100 based on 40 reviews, while the Xbox version received a score of 84 out of 100 based on 37 reviews. The game was a nominee for GameSpot's 2004 "Best Adventure Game" award, and the Xbox port was nominated at the 2004 National Academy of Video Game Trade Reviewers Awards in the "Direction, Cinema" category. Multiple reviewers noted that it was a good version of, but did not evolve, survival horror of the time.

Japanese gaming magazine Famitsu described the game as "first-class horror entertainment", although the reviewers differed on how scary the game was compared to its predecessor. Eurogamer's Kristan Reed lauded the atmosphere and design as the best survival horror experience in her memory, although she admitted there was little innovation in the gameplay or mechanics new to the genre. Bethany Massimilla of GameSpot praised the narrative and gameplay as appealing to series and genre fans, with her only real complaint being a lack of difficulty. Game Informer's Lisa Mason lauded the scares, narrative, and essential gameplay, but found camera upgrades cumbersome. In a second opinion, Andrew Reiner felt there "[wasn't] much to the gameplay", but its scares and the chemistry between Mio and Mayu kept him playing. Steve Steinberg of GameSpy faulted the controls and a lack of cooperative gameplay, but otherwise praised Crimson Butterfly as an improvement over its predecessor. IGN's Jeremy Dunham, while admitting there was little truly innovative, described Crimson Butterfly as the realization of the original game's ambitions and a strong entry alongside other genre titles that year. Justin Speer, writing for XPlay, described the atmosphere as "absolutely chilling" and praised the combat despite finding the variety of scares lacking during later parts of the game.

Reviewing the Xbox port, Mason lauded the port's gameplay additions, visual upgrade and additional ending, finding the port superior to the original. In a second opinion, Matt Miller felt slow combat and repetitive puzzles undermined what he otherwise felt was "perfect" story and atmosphere. Massmilla summed up the Xbox version as "an absolutely great update to what was already a wonderfully spooky game", while Eurogamer's Rob Fahey noted that Crimson Butterfly hooked him in and kept him playing far more than Resident Evil 4. Russ Fischer of GameSpy continued to fault the lack of co-op play and its short length, but otherwise praised the additions and refinements to the gameplay and sound design. Hilary Goldstein of IGN positively noted the updated graphics and sound, but felt the gameplay and character movement was too slow. Computer and Video Games criticized the game's pacing and aging mechanics, but praised the atmosphere and solid gameplay premise.

== Legacy ==
A third Fatal Frame title began development shortly before the release of Crimson Butterfly, with the team intended it as the final entry for the PS2 generation and exploring new approaches to the series' established horror. Titled Fatal Frame III: The Tormented, the game was released in 2005 in Japan and North America, and 2006 in Europe. The Tormented continues storylines from the original Fatal Frame and Crimson Butterfly, creating a narrative trilogy.

In the years since its release, several websites have included it on rankings of the scariest video games produced. Writing for Ars Technica in an article of that type, Ben Kuchera cited its use of atmosphere and the camera-based gameplay as keeping the player on edge throughout the experience. Video game writer and director Neil Druckmann mentioned the game positively in a 2014 interview, describing it as "the scariest kind of experience in any medium". In a Game Informer article highlighting developers' horror game choices, Crimson Butterfly was chosen as one of the scariest games around by multiple other Western game developers, including Naughty Dog's Bruce Straley and Drew Murray of Insomniac Games.

=== Remakes ===
Crimson Butterfly has been remade twice. The first, Project Zero 2: Wii Edition, was developed for the Wii and released in 2012 in Japan, Europe, and Australia. The graphics were updated and its gameplay was redesigned based on the fourth Fatal Frame title, Mask of the Lunar Eclipse (2008). The remake includes more story elements and two additional endings while incorporating content from the Xbox release. A second remake, Fatal Frame II: Crimson Butterfly Remake, was released on March 12, 2026 for PlayStation 5, Xbox Series X/S, Windows, and Nintendo Switch 2.
