= Catalog =

Catalog or catalogue may refer to:

- Cataloging
  - in science and technology
    - Library catalog, a catalog of books and other media
      - Union catalog, a combined library catalog describing the collections of a number of libraries
    - Calendar (archives) and Finding aid, catalogs of an archive
    - Astronomical catalog, a catalog of astronomical objects
      - Star catalog, a catalog of stars
    - Pharmacopoeia, a book containing directions for the preparation of compound medicines
    - Database catalog, in computer science
  - in arts
    - Collection catalog, a catalog of a museum
    - Exhibition catalogue, a catalogue of art
    - Catalogue raisonné, a list of artworks
    - Music catalog, a catalog of musical compositions
    - Font catalog, a catalog of typefaces containing specimen with example use of fonts
  - in sales
    - Mail order catalog
    - Parts book, a book published by a manufacturer, containing the part numbers of their products
    - Trade literature, printed materials published by creating, wholesaling, or retailing firms
    - The retail product offerings of an online shopping service
  - in other uses
    - Auction catalog, a catalog that lists items to be sold at an auction
    - Stamp catalog, a catalog of postage stamps
- as a proper name
  - Catalogue (John Hartford album), 1981
  - Catalogue (Moloko album), 2006
  - Catalog (album), an album by Amano Tsukiko
  - Catalogue 1987–1995, 1995 album by Buck-Tick
  - Catalogue 2005, 2005 album by Buck-Tick
  - The Catalogue, 2009 box set by Kraftwerk
  - 3-D – The Catalogue, 2017 album by Kraftwerk

== See also ==
- Catalog album (disambiguation)
- Catalogue aria, a genre of aria, particularly in Italian-language comic operas
- Categorization
- Compendium
- Registry (disambiguation)
- Systematic name
- Taxonomy (biology)
- In catalogue
