= Catalog album =

Catalog album may refer to:

- Greatest hits album
- Catalog Albums, a Billboard chart for older albums
- Catalog (album), 2006 Tsukiko Amano album

== See also ==
- Catalog (disambiguation)
