= Tsukiko =

Tsukiko is a Japanese feminine given name, and may refer to:

- Tsuki Amano
- Tsukiko Sagi, a character in Paranoia Agent
- Tsukiko, a character in The Order of the Stick webcomic
- Tsukiko Tsutsukakushi (筒隠 月子), a character in The "Hentai" Prince and the Stony Cat
