= Tsuki (disambiguation) =

Tsuki, in Japanese and Okinawan martial arts, is used to refer to various thrusting techniques. It also stands for the Moon in Japanese.

Tsuki may also refer to:

- Tsuki Amano, Japanese singer
- Tzuki, Mexican Mini-Estrella wrestler (sometimes spelled Tsuki)
- "Tsuki" (song), a 2014 song by Namie Amuro
- "Tsuki", a 2004 song by Tsuki Amano, as Tsukiko Amano
- "Tsuki", a 2013 song by Flower Flower
- "Tsuki", a 1994 song by Keisuke Kuwata
- Tsuki, singer with the South Korean girl group Billlie
- Tsuki, clothing brand launched by Felix "PewDiePie" Kjellberg and Marzia Kjellberg
