= A Moon Child in the Sky =

A Moon Child In The Sky

Studio album by Tsukiko Amano
- Released: September 21, 2005
- Genre: Rock
- Label: Otokura
- Producer: Hirotomo Tokura

Tsukiko Amano chronology
| Winona Riders ~Tsuki no Uragawa~ (2004) | A Moon Child In The Sky (2005) | Catalog (2006) |

A Moon Child in the Sky is an album by Tsukiko Amano. The name is a play on the translation of her first name (月 (Tsuki) = Moon, 子 (Ko) = Child, 天 (Ama) = Sky or Heaven). It was released on September 21, 2005 on the Otokura Records label, and was distributed by Pony Canyon. It reached #46 on the Oricon charts, and remained on the chart for five weeks.

== Track listing ==
1. "A Moon Child in the Sky"
2. "Devil Flamingo"
3. "Joker Joe"
4. "Idea (A Moon Child mix)" (イデア (A Moon Child mix))
5. "Stone"
6. "Hisui (A Moon Child type)" (翡翠 (A Moon Child type); "Jade (A Moon Child type)")
7. 1/2 -a half-
8. "Koe" (聲; "Voice")
9. "Satō Mizu" (砂糖水; "Sugar Water")
10. "Parade" (パレード)
11. "Hakase to Kujaku" (博士と孔雀; "PhDs and Peacocks")
12. "Kakan" (花冠; "Garland")
13. "Taisō" (体操; "Gymnastics")
  - Hidden track.
