= Thomas Chippendale =

English furniture designer (1718–1779)

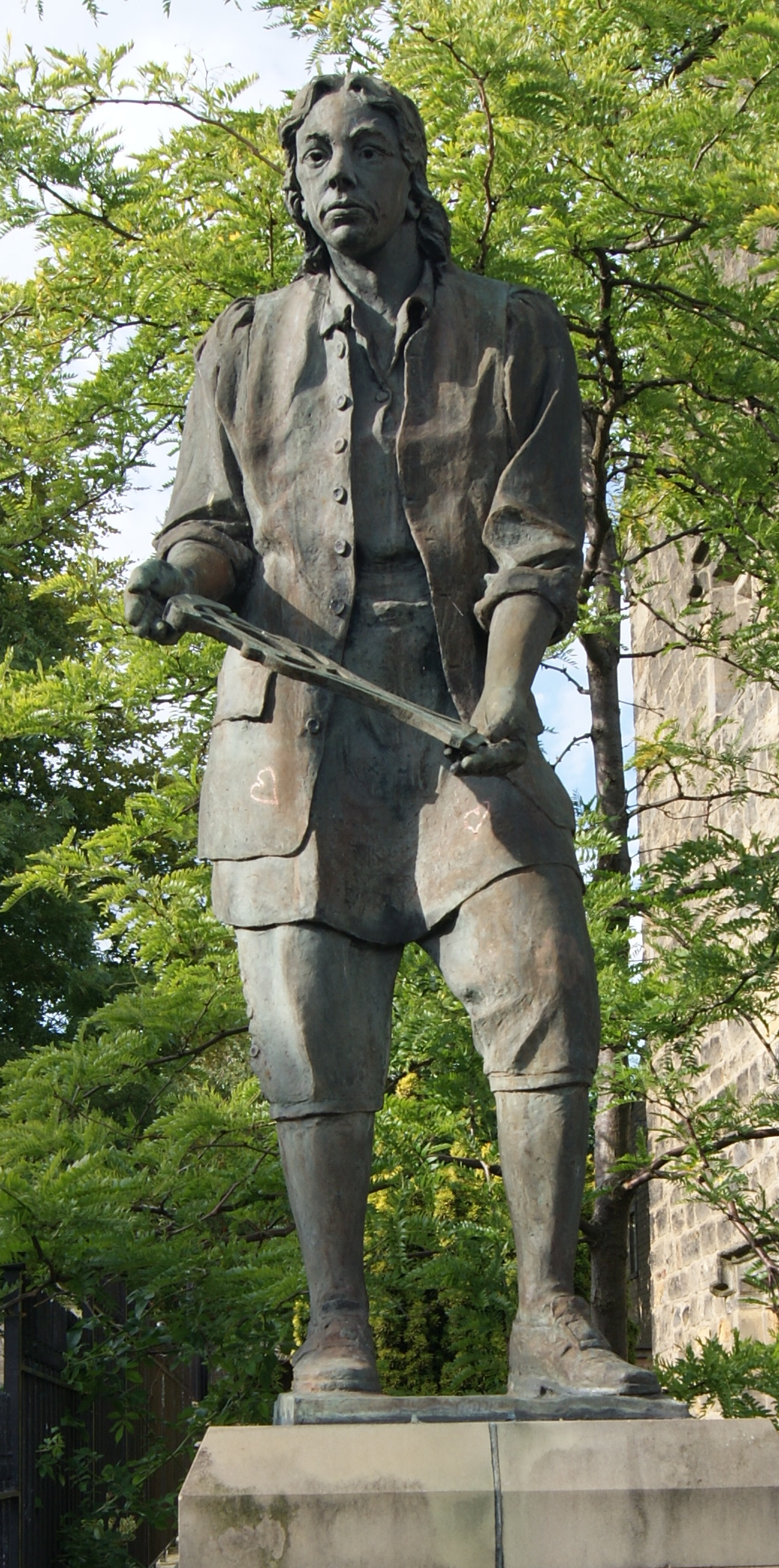
- Chippendale statue in Otley, West Yorkshire, England
- Born: June 1718; Otley, England
- Died: 1779 (aged 60–61); London, England
- Children: Thomas, 4 other sons, 4 daughters, and 3 others

Thomas Chippendale (June 1718 – 1779) was an English woodworker in London, designing furniture in the mid-Georgian, English Rococo, and Neoclassical styles. In 1754 he published a book of his designs in a trade catalogue titled The Gentleman and Cabinet Maker's Director—the most important collection of furniture designs published in England to that point which created a mass market for furniture—upon which success he became renowned. According to the Victoria and Albert Museum, "so influential were his designs, in Britain and throughout Europe and America, that 'Chippendale' became a shorthand description for any furniture similar to his Director designs".

The designs are regarded as representing the current British fashion for furniture of that period and are now reproduced globally. He was buried 16 November 1779, according to the records of St Martin-in-the-Fields, in the cemetery since built upon by the National Gallery. Chippendale furniture is highly valued; a padouk cabinet that was offered for auction during 2008 sold for £2,729,250.

== Life ==
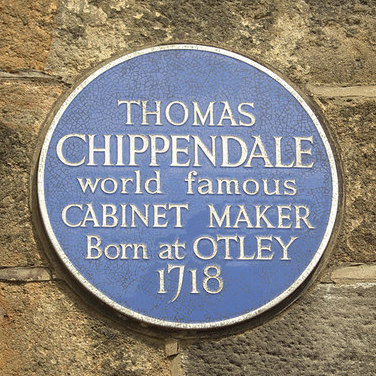
Blue plaque to Chippendale's memory in the place of his birth

Chippendale was born in Otley in the West Riding of Yorkshire, England in June 1718. He was baptised on 5 June. He was the only child of John Chippendale (1690–1768), joiner, and his first wife Mary (née Drake; 1693–1729). He received an elementary education at Prince Henry's Grammar School, Otley. The Chippendale family had long been involved with the wood working trades and so he probably received his basic training from his father, though it is believed that he was also trained by Richard Wood in York, before he relocated to London. Wood later ordered eight copies of the Director. On 19 May 1748, he married Catherine Redshaw at St George's Chapel, Mayfair and they had five sons and four daughters.

During 1749, Chippendale rented a modest house in Conduit Court, near Covent Garden. In 1752, he relocated to Somerset Court, off the Strand. In 1754, Chippendale relocated to 60–62 St Martin's Lane in London, where for the next 60 years the family business operated, until 1813 when his son, Thomas Chippendale (Junior), was evicted for bankruptcy. During 1754, he also began a partnership with James Rannie, a wealthy Scottish merchant, who put money into the business at the same time as Chippendale produced the first edition of the Director. Rannie and his bookkeeper, Thomas Haig, probably cared for the finances of the business. His wife, Catherine, died during 1772. After James Rannie died in 1766, Thomas Haig seems to have borrowed £2,000 from Rannie's widow, which he used to become Chippendale's partner. One of Rannie's executors, Henry Ferguson, became a third partner and so the business became Chippendale, Haig and Co. Thomas Chippendale (Junior) assumed management of the business in 1776 allowing his father to retire. He relocated to what was then called Lob's Fields (now known as Derry Street) in Kensington. Chippendale married Elizabeth Davis at Fulham Parish Church on 5 August 1777. He fathered three more children. In 1779, Chippendale relocated to Hoxton where he died of tuberculosis and was buried at St Martin-in-the-Fields on 16 November 1779.

There is a statue and memorial plaque dedicated to Chippendale outside The Old Grammar School Gallery in Manor Square, in his home town of Otley, near Leeds, Yorkshire. There is a full-size sculpted figure of Thomas Chippendale on the façade of the Victoria and Albert Museum, London.

== Work ==
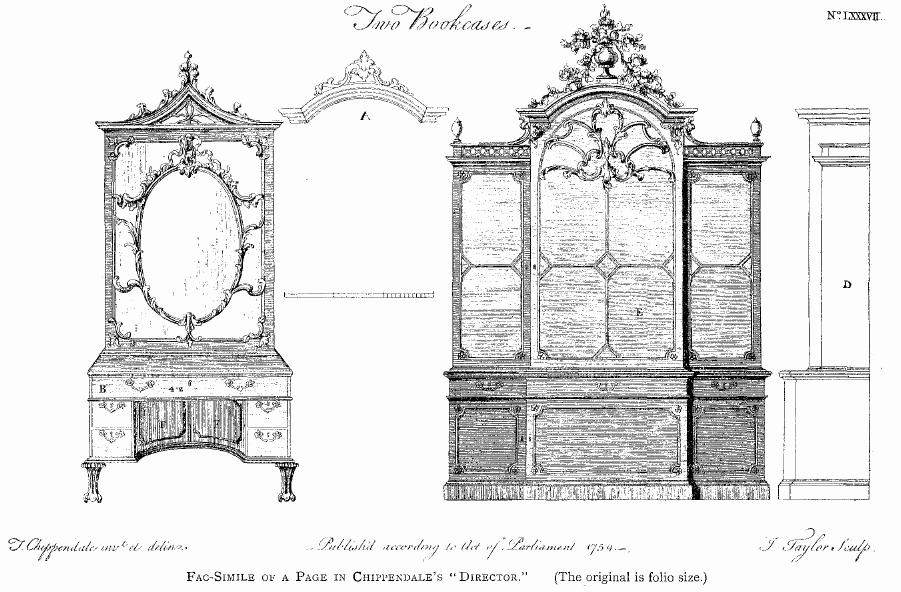
"Two Bookcases", from the Director, 1754

After working as a journeyman cabinet maker in London, during 1754, he became the first cabinet-maker to publish a book of his designs, titled The Gentleman and Cabinet Maker's Director. It is regarded as the "first comprehensive trade catalogue of its kind". According to The New York Times, "customers could browse, select a design and then order a piece of furniture".

Three editions were published, the first in 1754, followed by a virtual reprint in 1755, and finally a revised and enlarged edition in 1762, by which time Chippendale's illustrated designs began to show signs of Neoclassicism. Chippendale had considerable competition during his active years, most notably from Ince and Mayhew. From the 1760s Chippendale was influenced heavily by the Neoclassical work of architect Robert Adam.

=== Notable works ===
Chippendale was much more than just a cabinet maker; he was an interior designer who advised on other aspects of decor such as soft furnishings and even the colour a room should be painted. During the company's period of greatest success, he worked with other specialists to provide fully decorated and furnished rooms or houses, once the principal construction was done. Chippendale often received large-scale commissions from aristocratic clients. Twenty-six of these commissions have been identified. Here furniture by Chippendale can still be seen. The locations include:

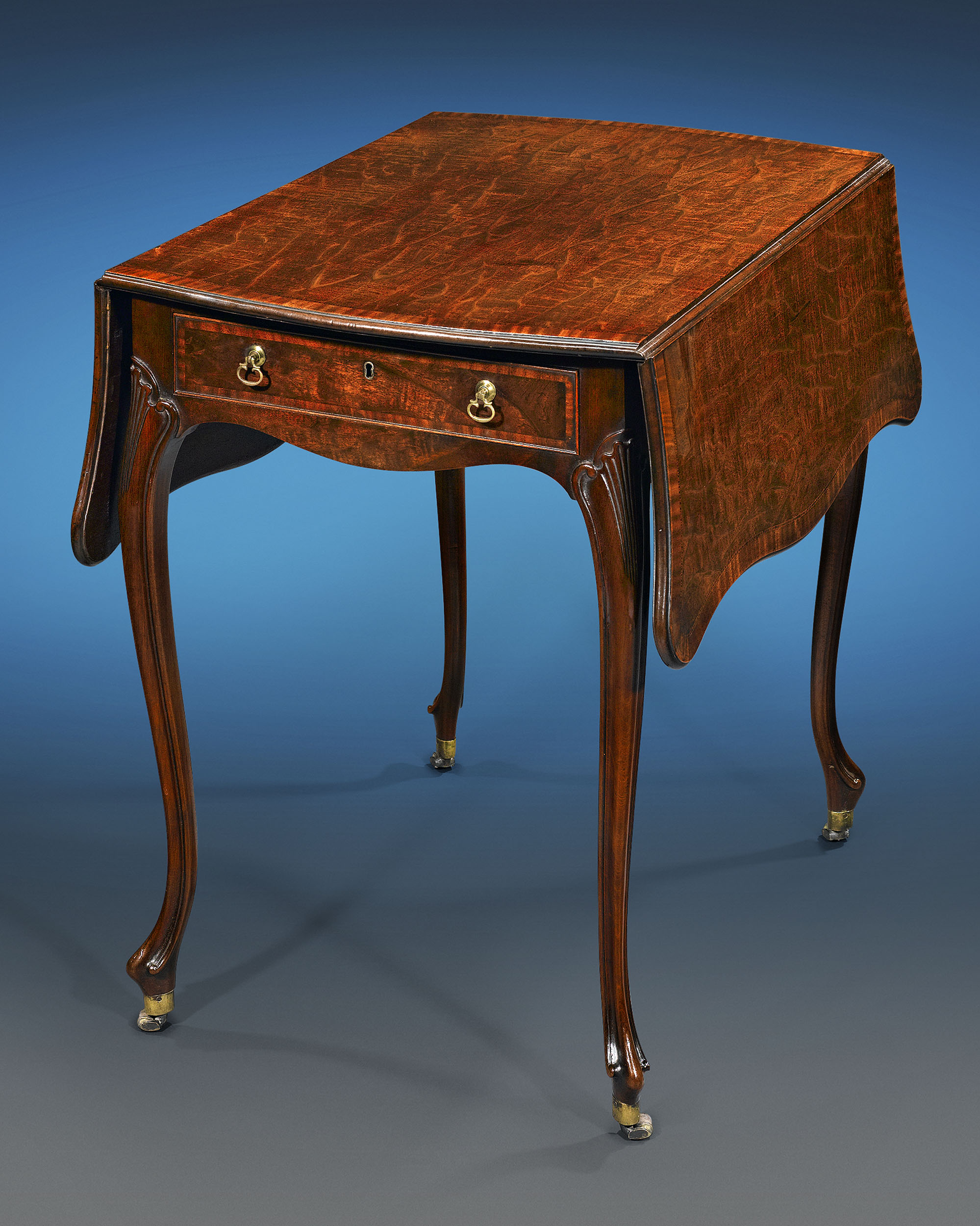
Pembroke Table by Chippendale for Paxton House, 1775

- Sledmere House, Yorkshire, for Sir Christopher Sykes, 2nd Baronet (c. 1772–76);
- Nostell Priory, Yorkshire, for Sir Roland Winn (1766–85);
- Blair Castle, Perthshire, for James Murray, 2nd Duke of Atholl (1758);
- Wilton House, for Henry Herbert, 10th Earl of Pembroke (c. 1759–73);
- For the actor David Garrick, both in town and at his villa at Hampton, Middlesex;
- Normanton Hall, Rutland and other houses for Sir Gilbert Heathcote, 3rd Baronet (1768–78) that included the management of a funeral for Lady Bridget Heathcote, 1772;
- Harewood House, Yorkshire, for Edwin Lascelles (1767–78);
- Newby Hall, Yorkshire, for William Weddell (c. 1772–76);
- Temple Newsam, Yorkshire, for Charles Ingram, 9th Viscount of Irvine (1774);
- Paxton House, Berwickshire, Scotland, for Ninian Home (1774–91);
- Burton Constable Hall, Yorkshire for William Constable (1768–79);
- Petworth House, Sussex and other houses for George Wyndham, 3rd Earl of Egremont (1777–79);
- Dumfries House, Ayrshire, Scotland, for William Crichton-Dalrymple, 5th Earl of Dumfries.

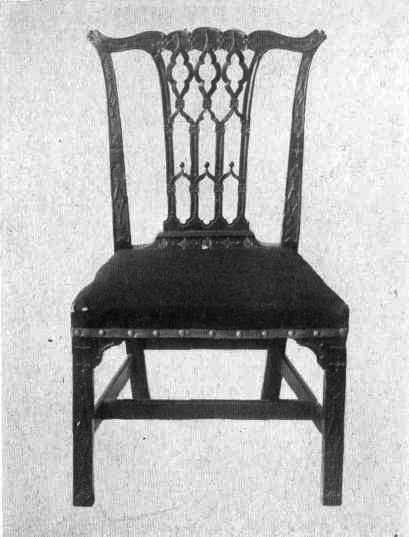
A provincial Chippendale-style chair with elaborate "Gothick" tracery splat back

Chippendale collaborated in furnishing interiors designed by Robert Adam, and at Brocket Hall, Hertfordshire, and Melbourne House, London, for Lord Melbourne, with Sir William Chambers (c. 1772–75).

=== Gallery of Chippendale furniture ===
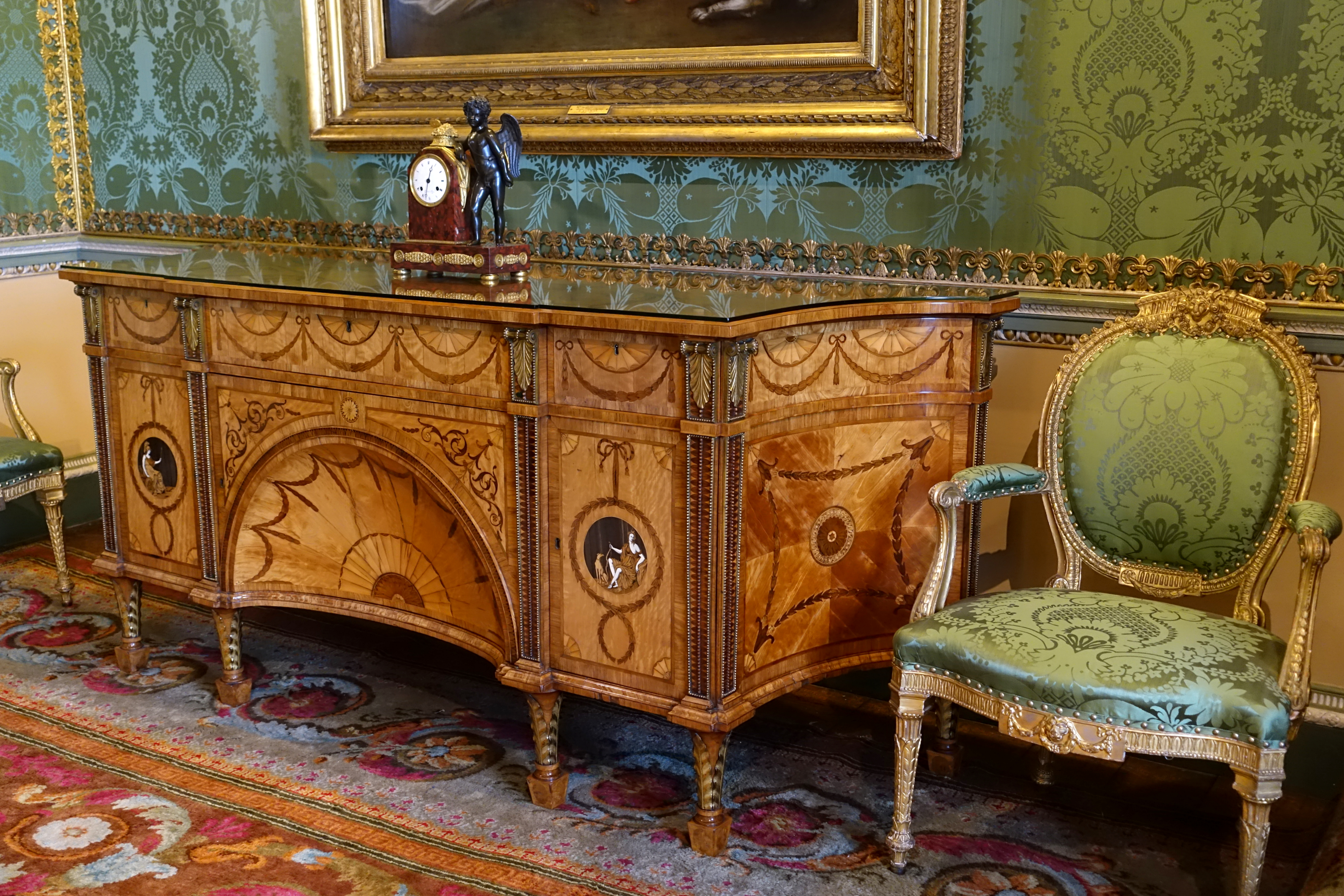
Diana and Minerva Commode, 1773, mahogany and exotic woods, State Bedroom – Harewood House

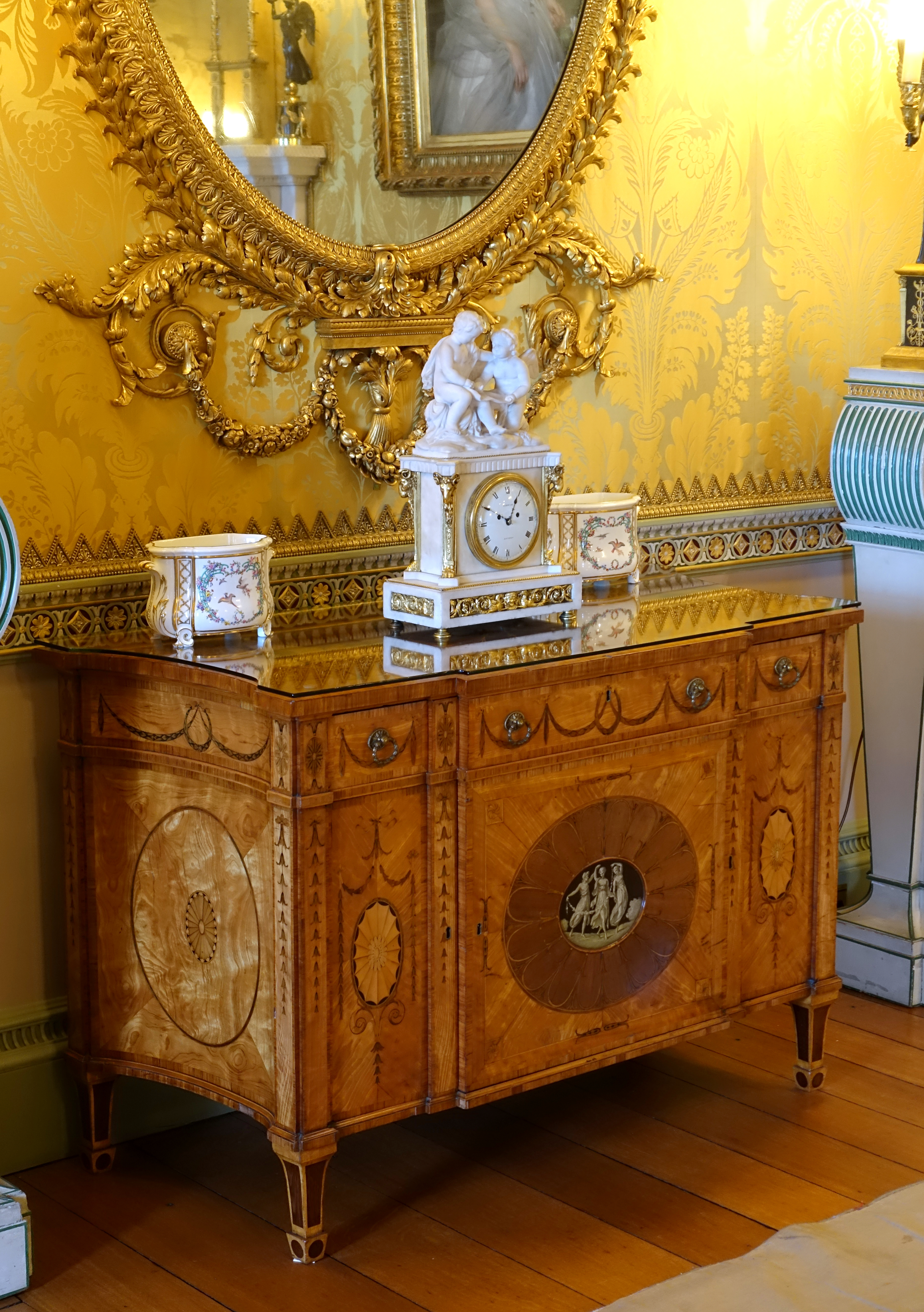
Dressing Commode with Three Graces, late 1700s, marquetry on satinwood with rosewood insets – Yellow Drawing Room – Harewood House

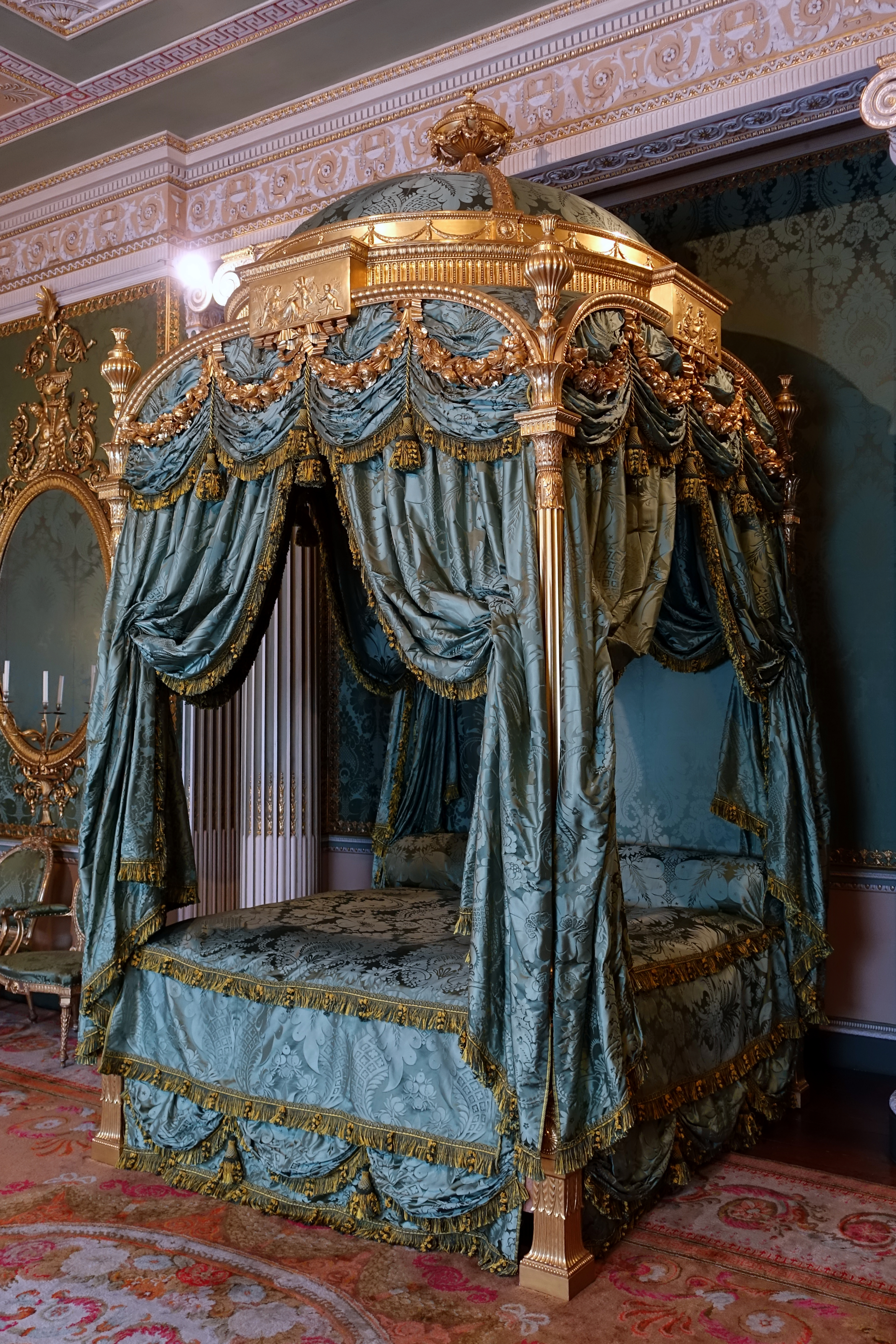
State Bed, 1773, carved and gilt wood, silk damask, State Bedroom – Harewood House

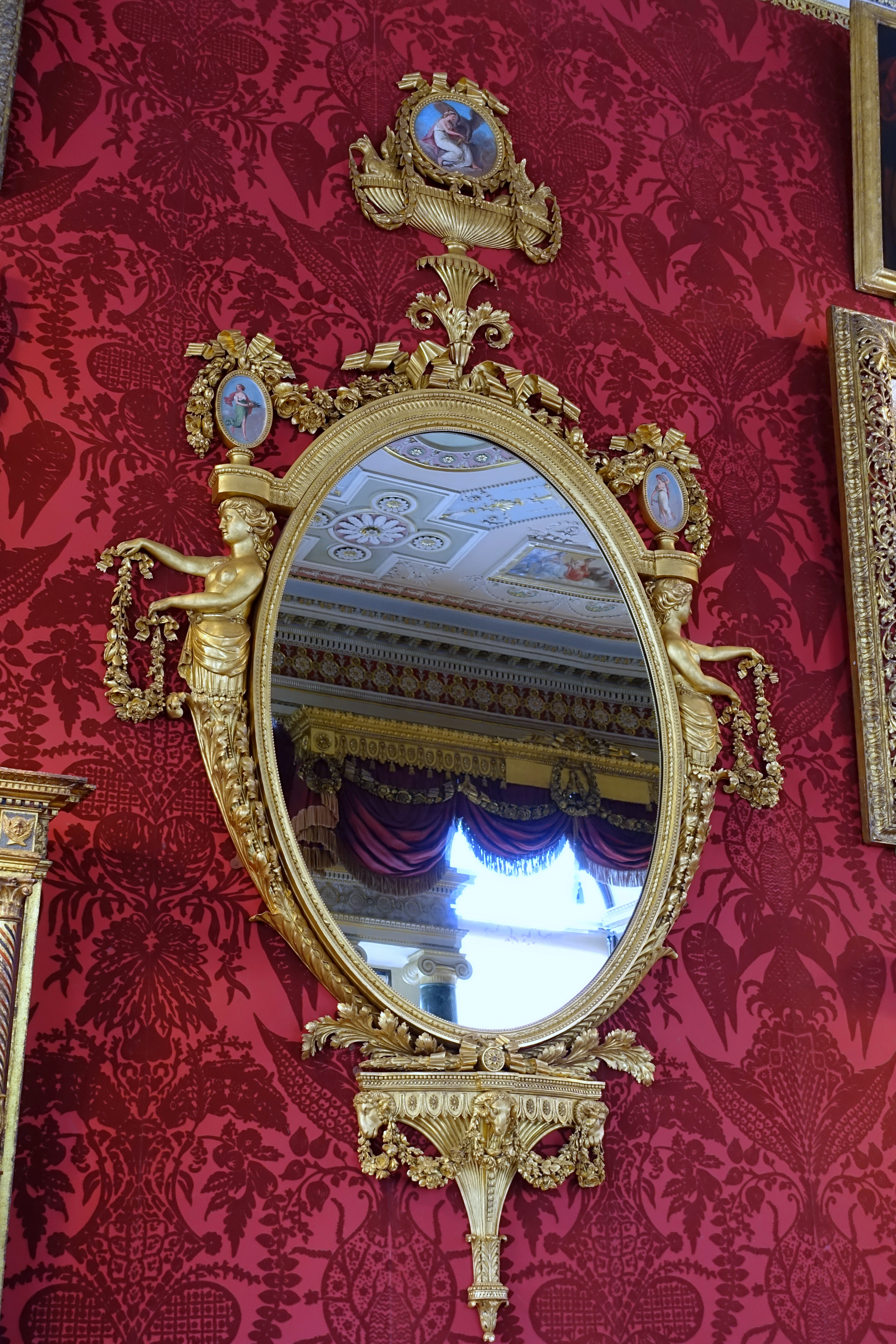
Mirror (one of a pair), c. 1778, giltwood – Gallery – Harewood House

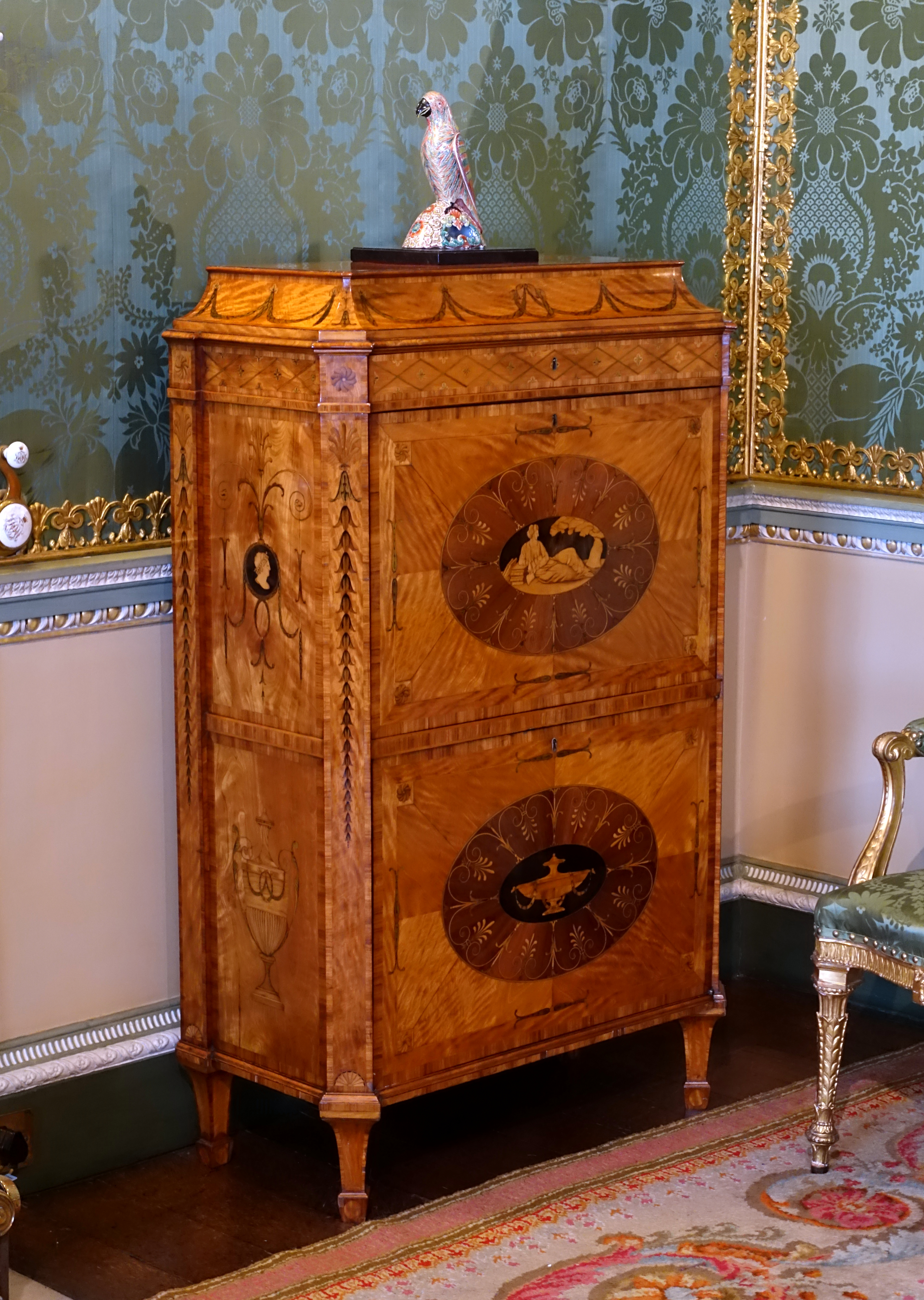
Secretaire, 1770s, State Bedroom – Harewood House

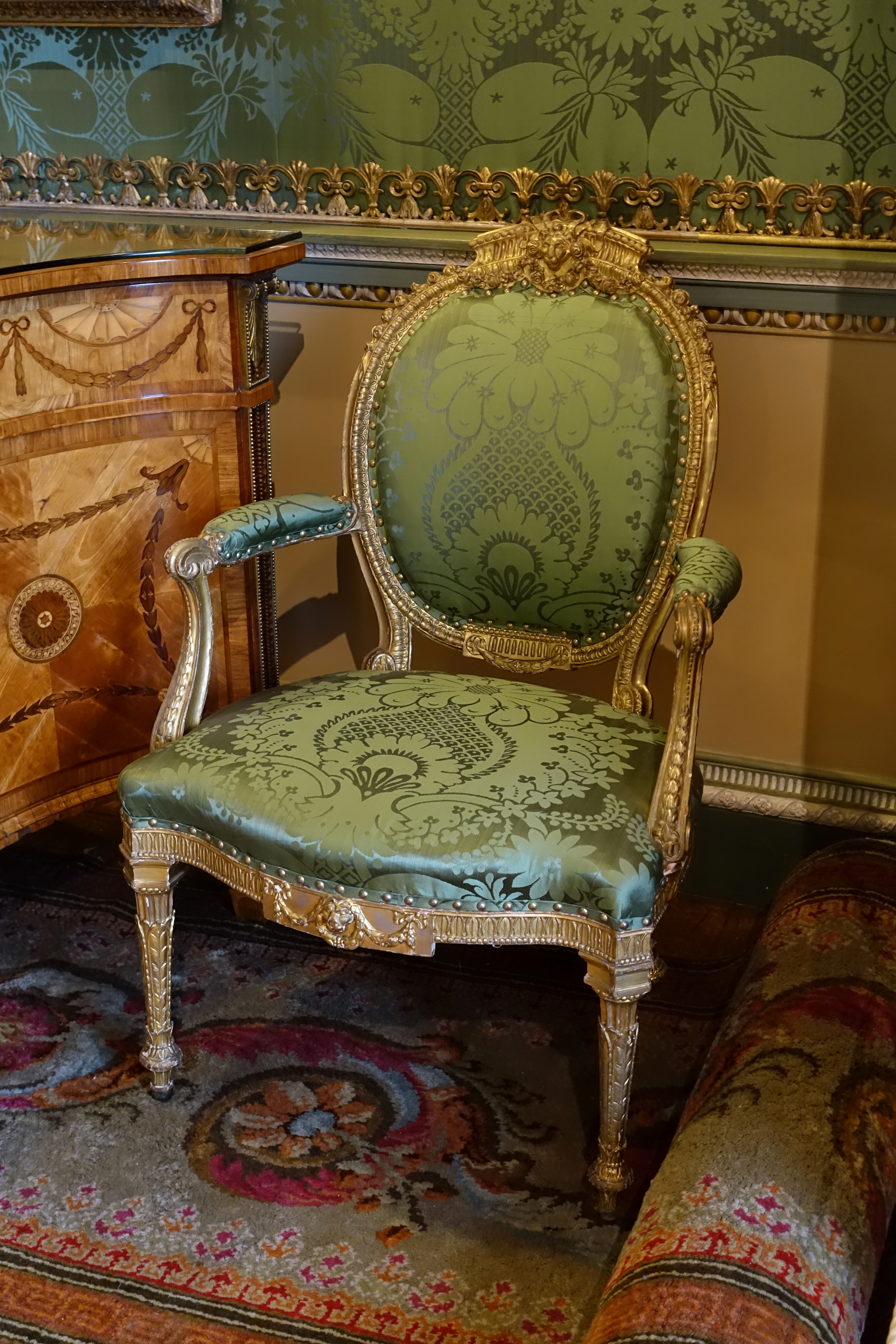
Armchair, 1773, giltwood, State Bedroom – Harewood House

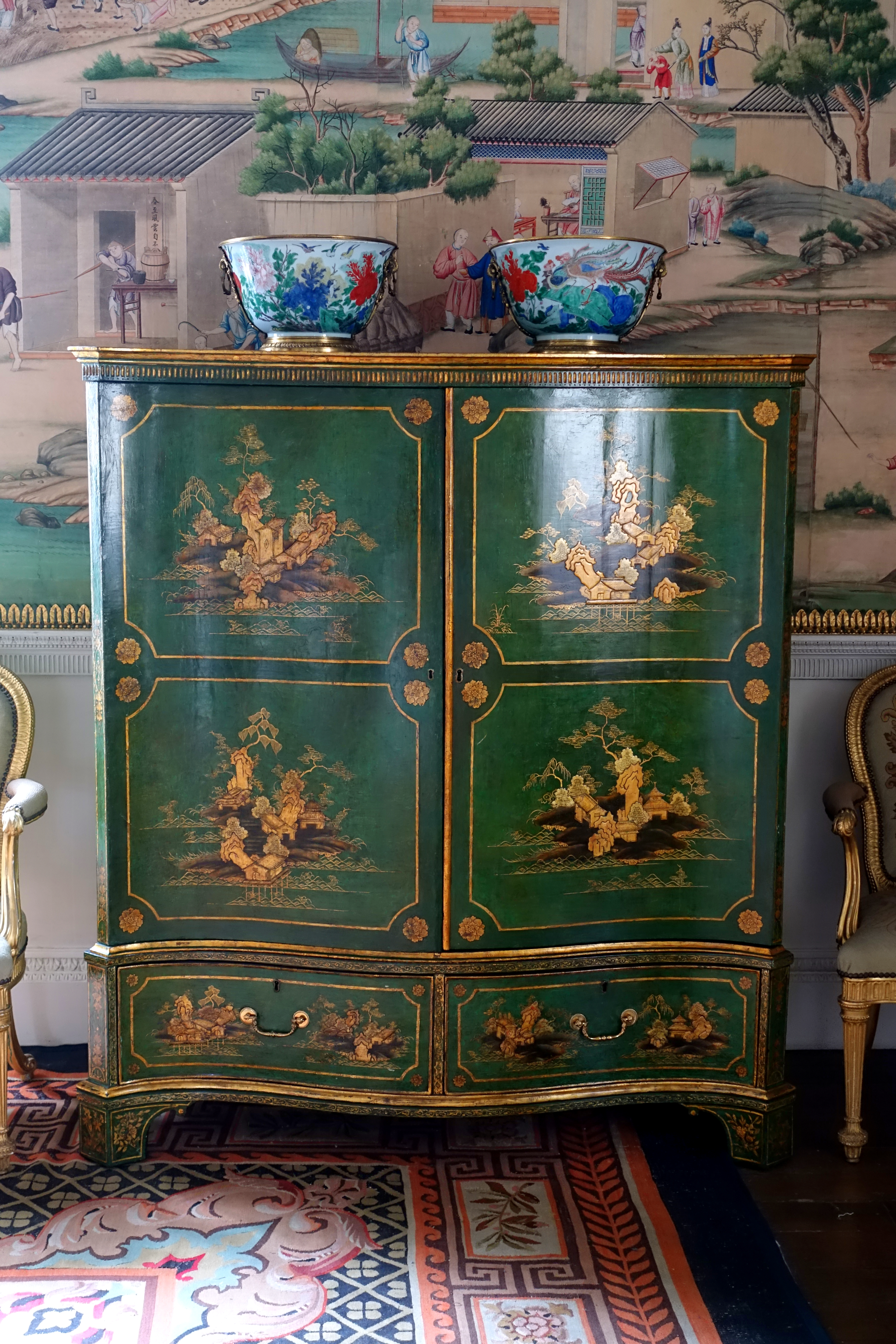
Clothes press, 1700s – East Bedroom – Harewood House

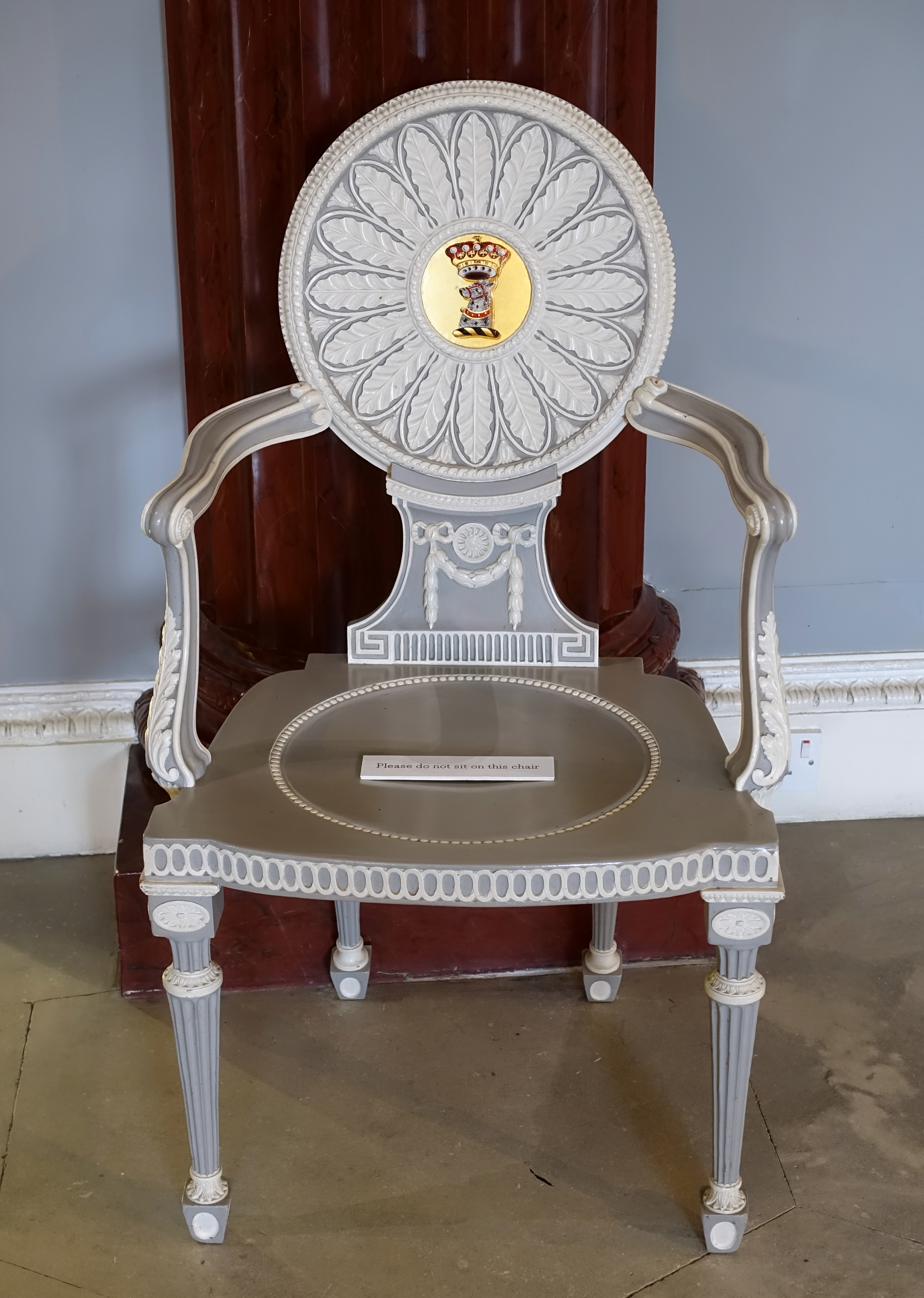
Chair (one of a suite) with Lascelles crest, 1700s – Entrance Hall – Harewood House

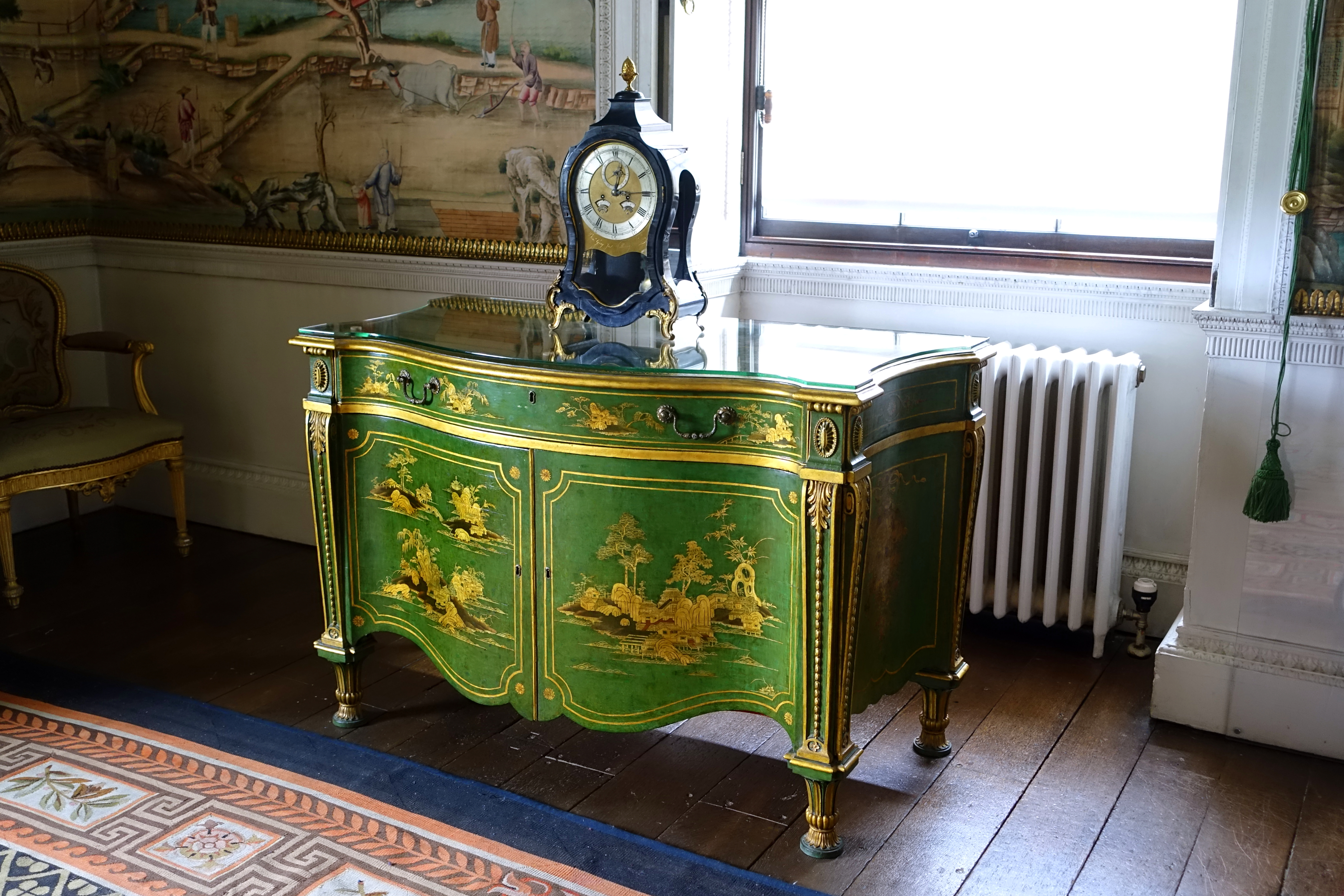
Commode, 1700s – East Bedroom – Harewood House

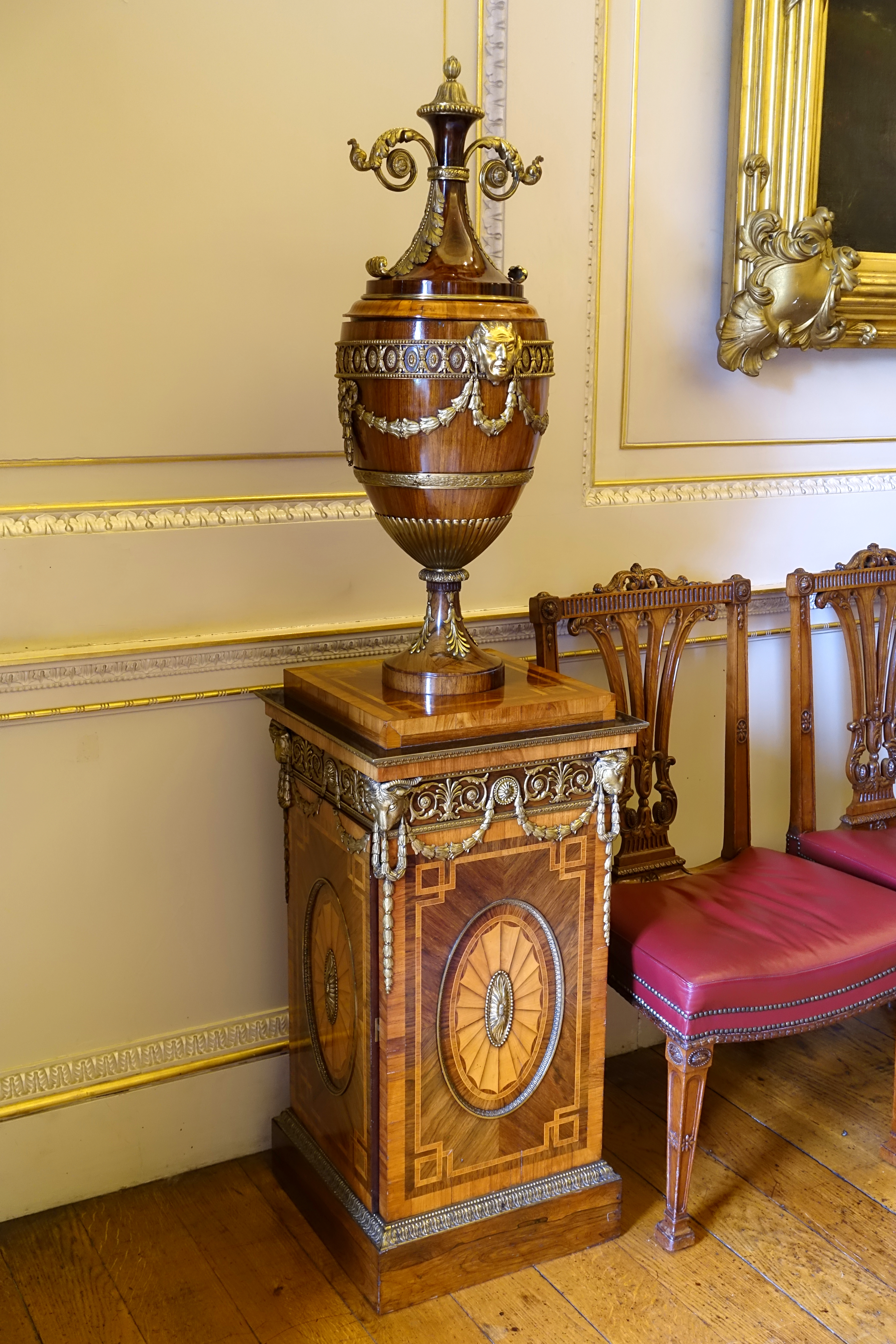
Pedestal and urn (one of a pair), mid 1700s, for use as a plate warmer – State Dining Room – Harewood House

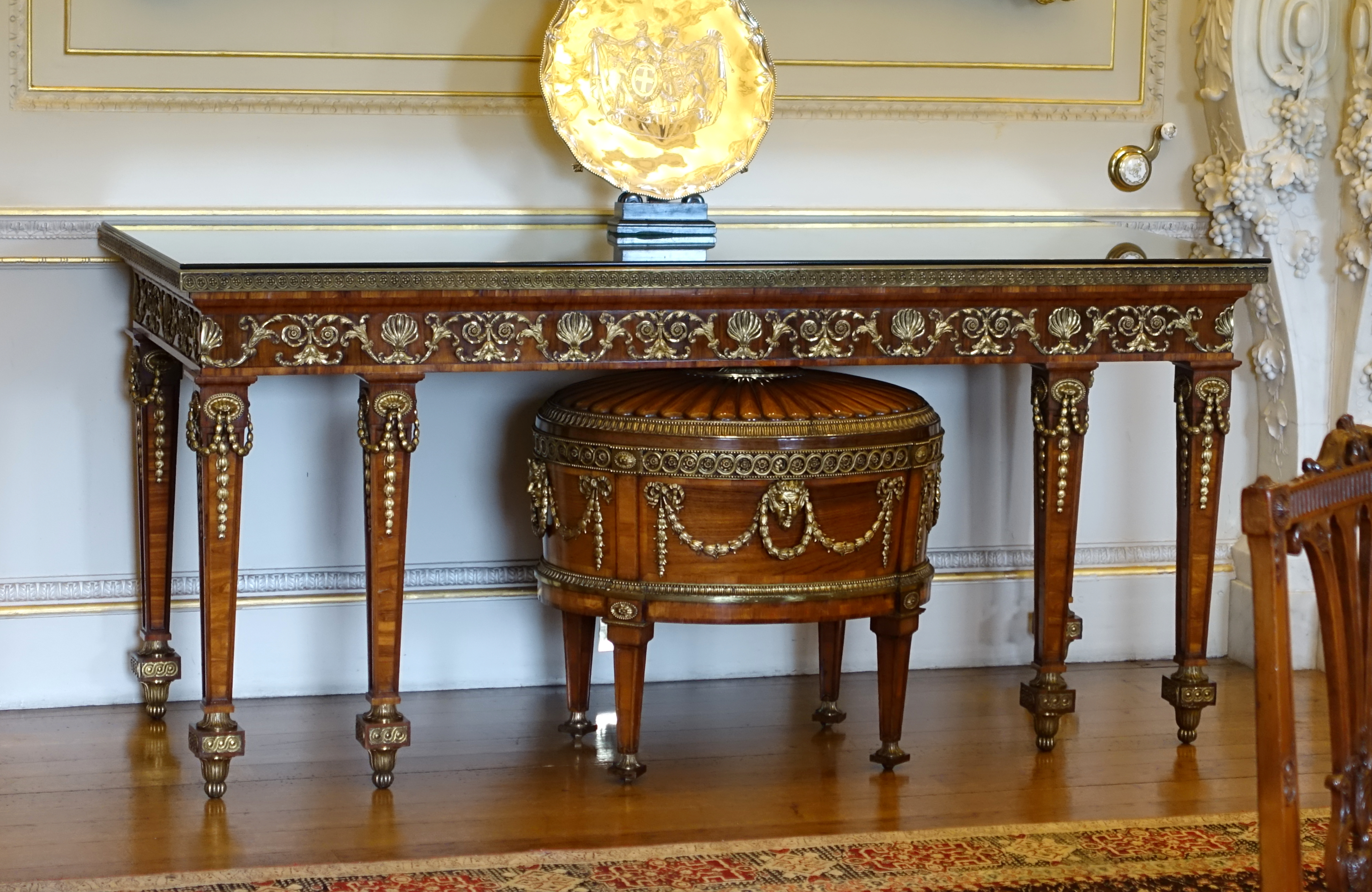
Pier table, origin unknown, with cellaret by Thomas Chippendale, c. 1771, rosewood and ormolu – State Dining Room – Harewood House

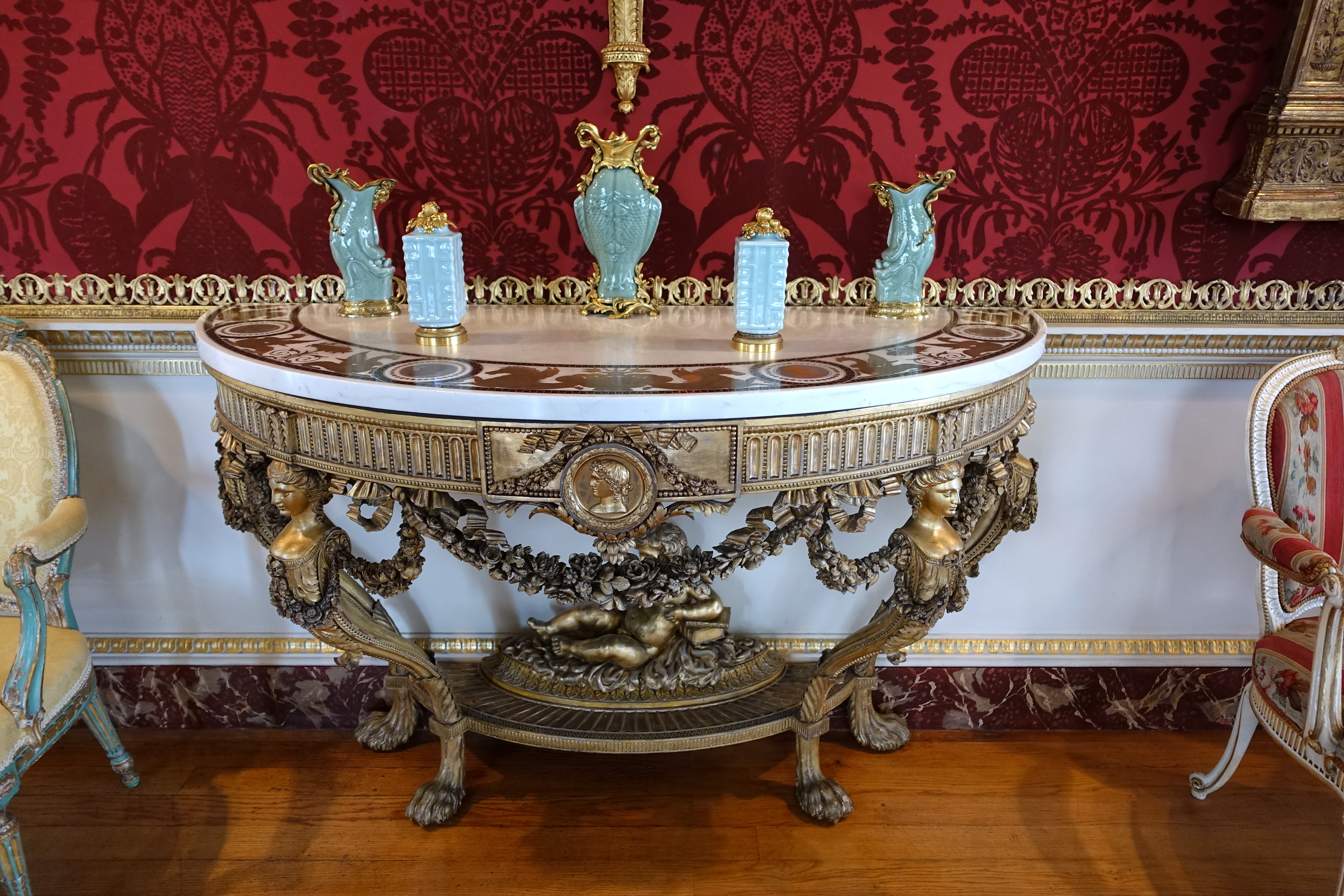
Pier table (one of a pair) c. 1779, giltwood with marble and scagliola top – Gallery – Harewood House

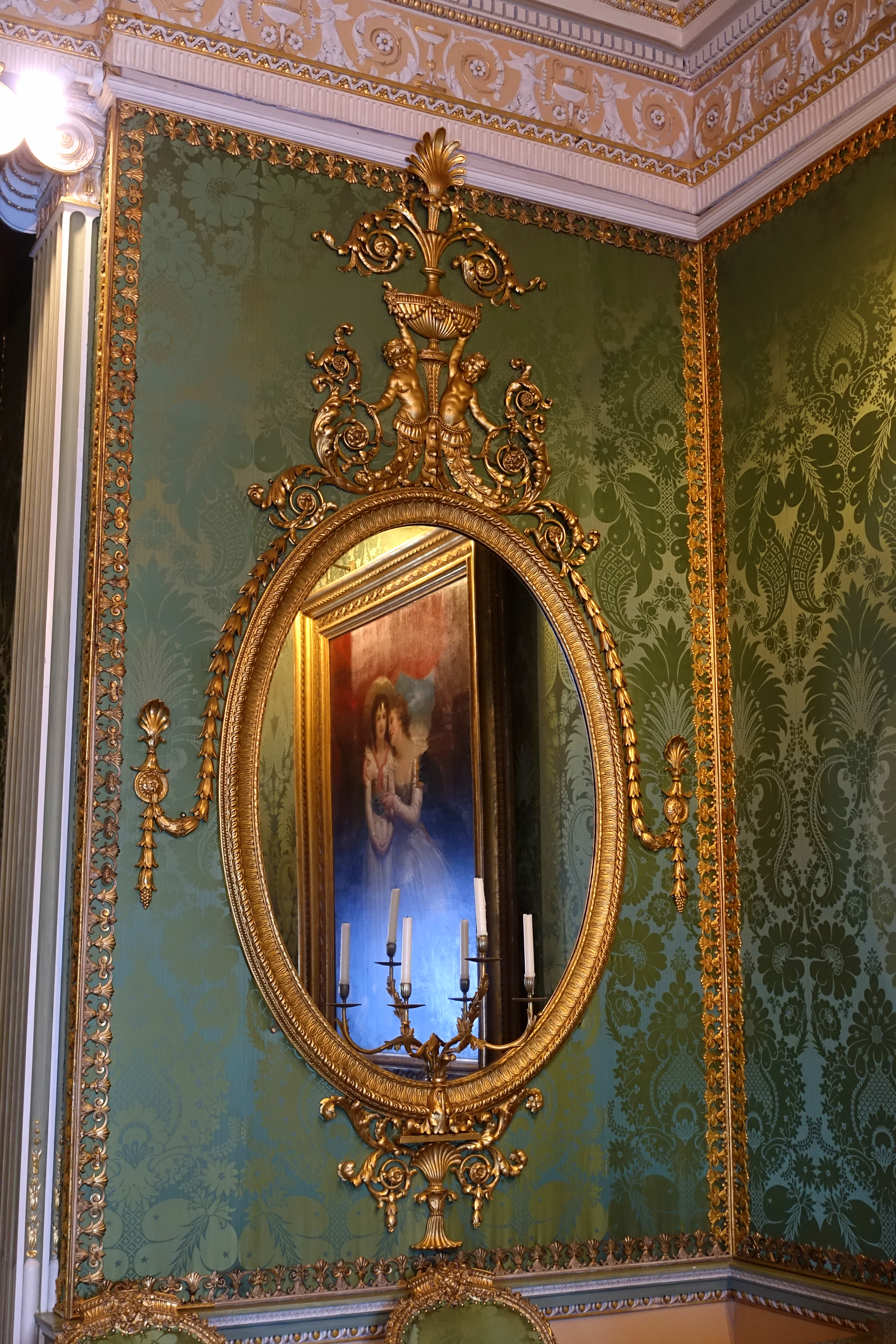
Mirror (one of a pair), 1773, giltwood, State Bedroom – Harewood House

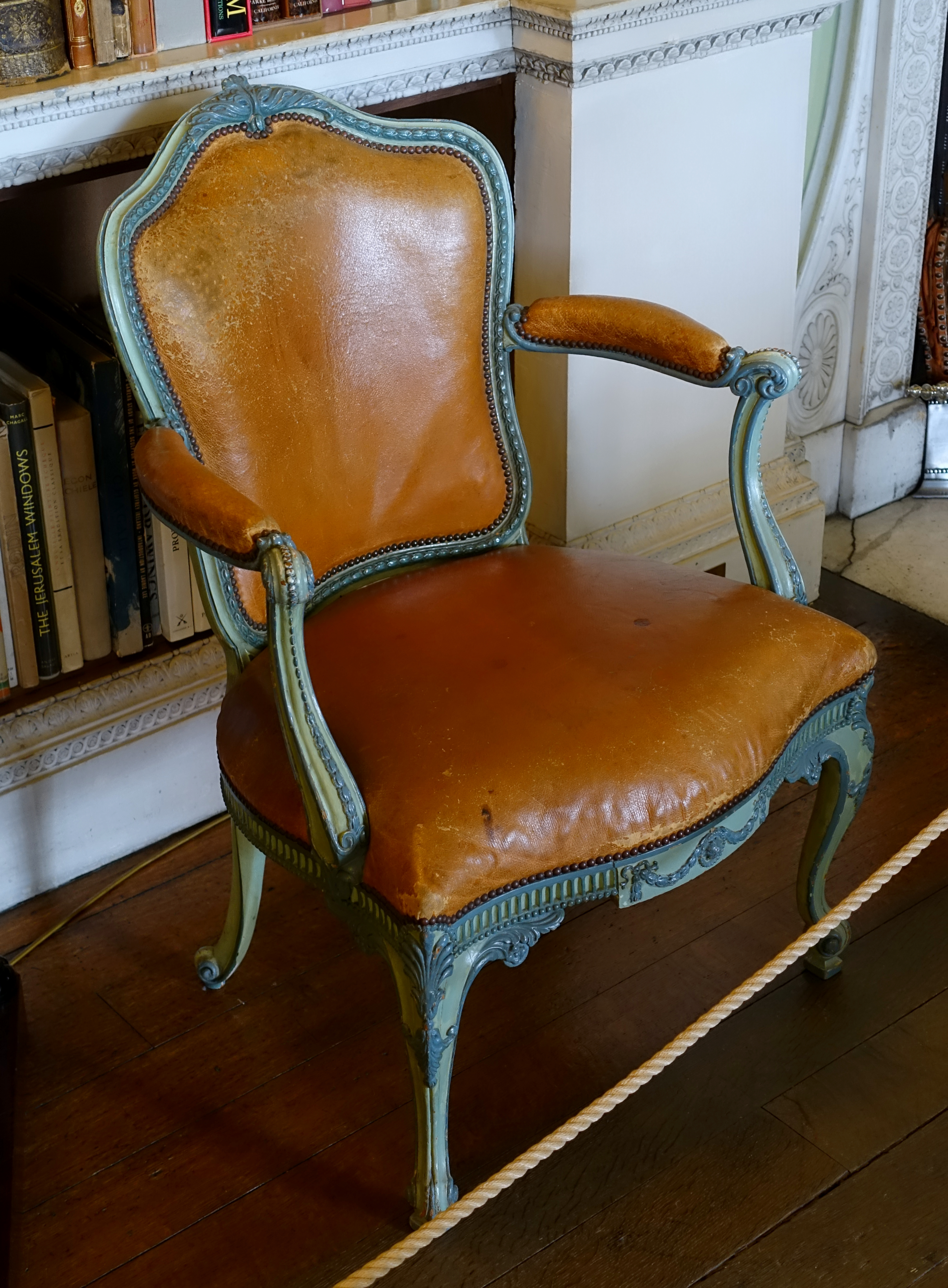
Arm chair, (one of a set), c. 1771, wood, yellow Morocco leather – Harewood House

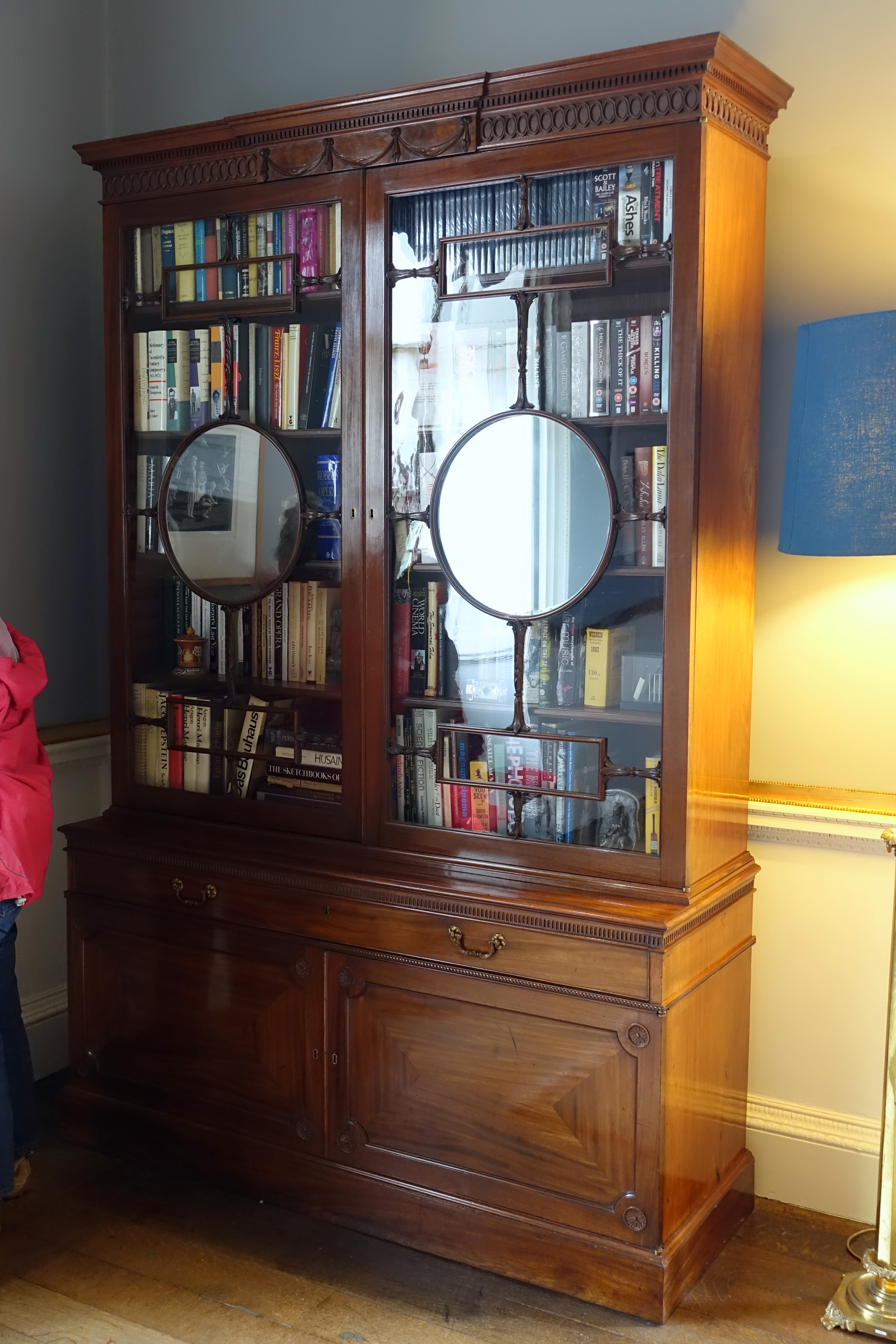
Cabinet, 1700s, mahogany – Lord Harewood's Sitting Room – Harewood House

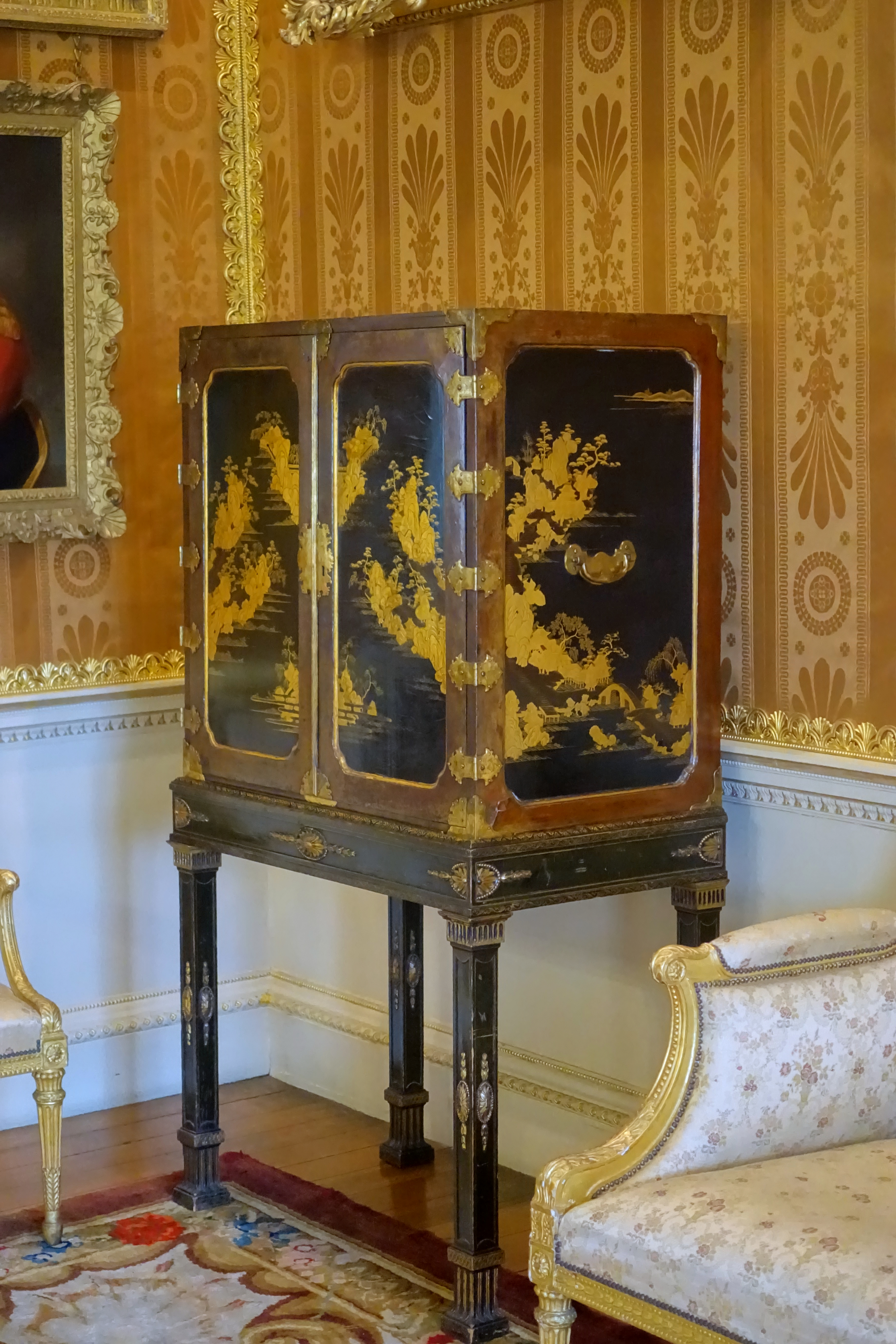
Japanned cabinet, (one of a pair) – Cinnamon Drawing Room – Harewood House

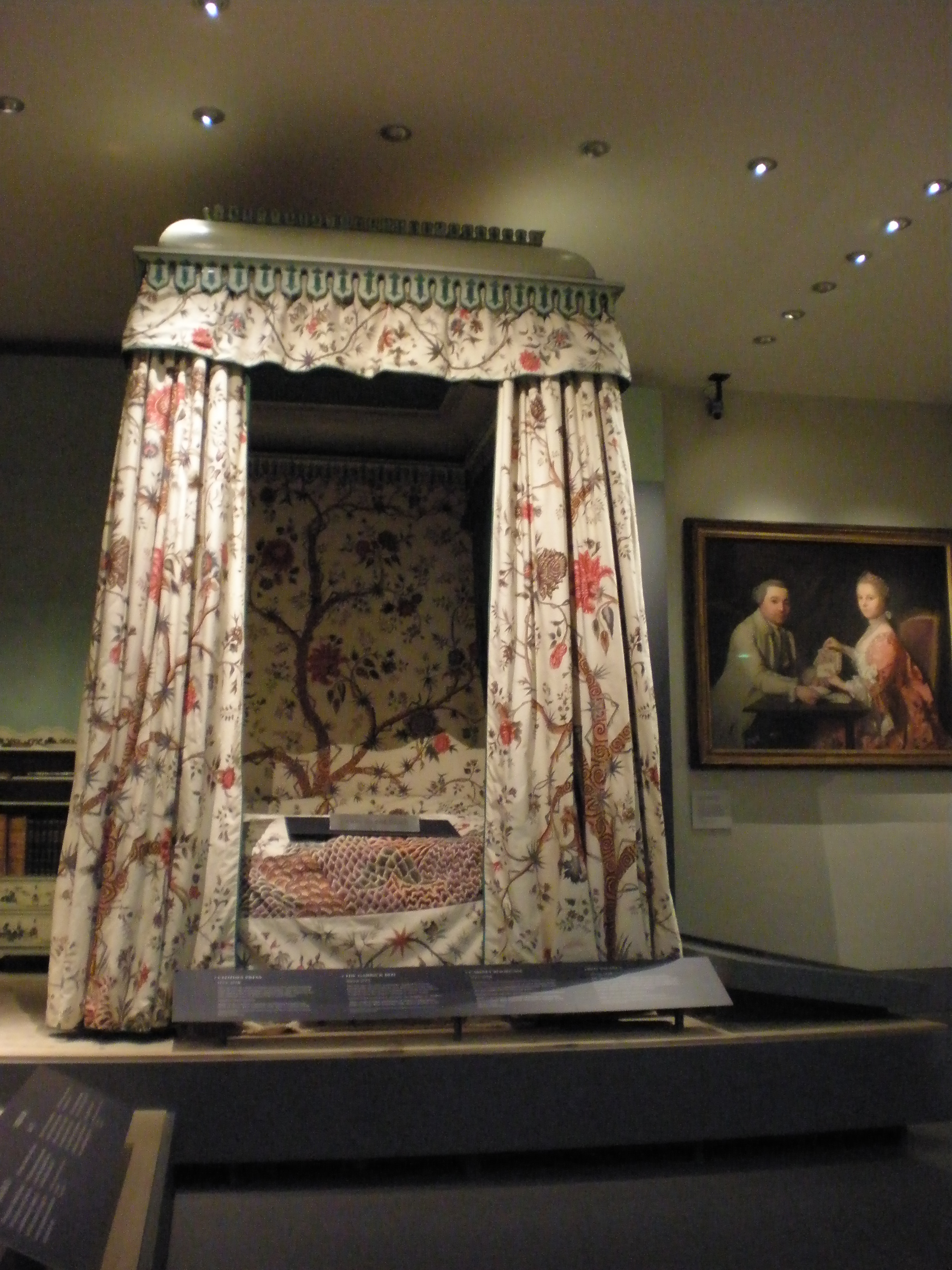
David Garrick's bed, c. 1775, The bed was reduced from a double to a single in the 1860s, now in the V&A Museum

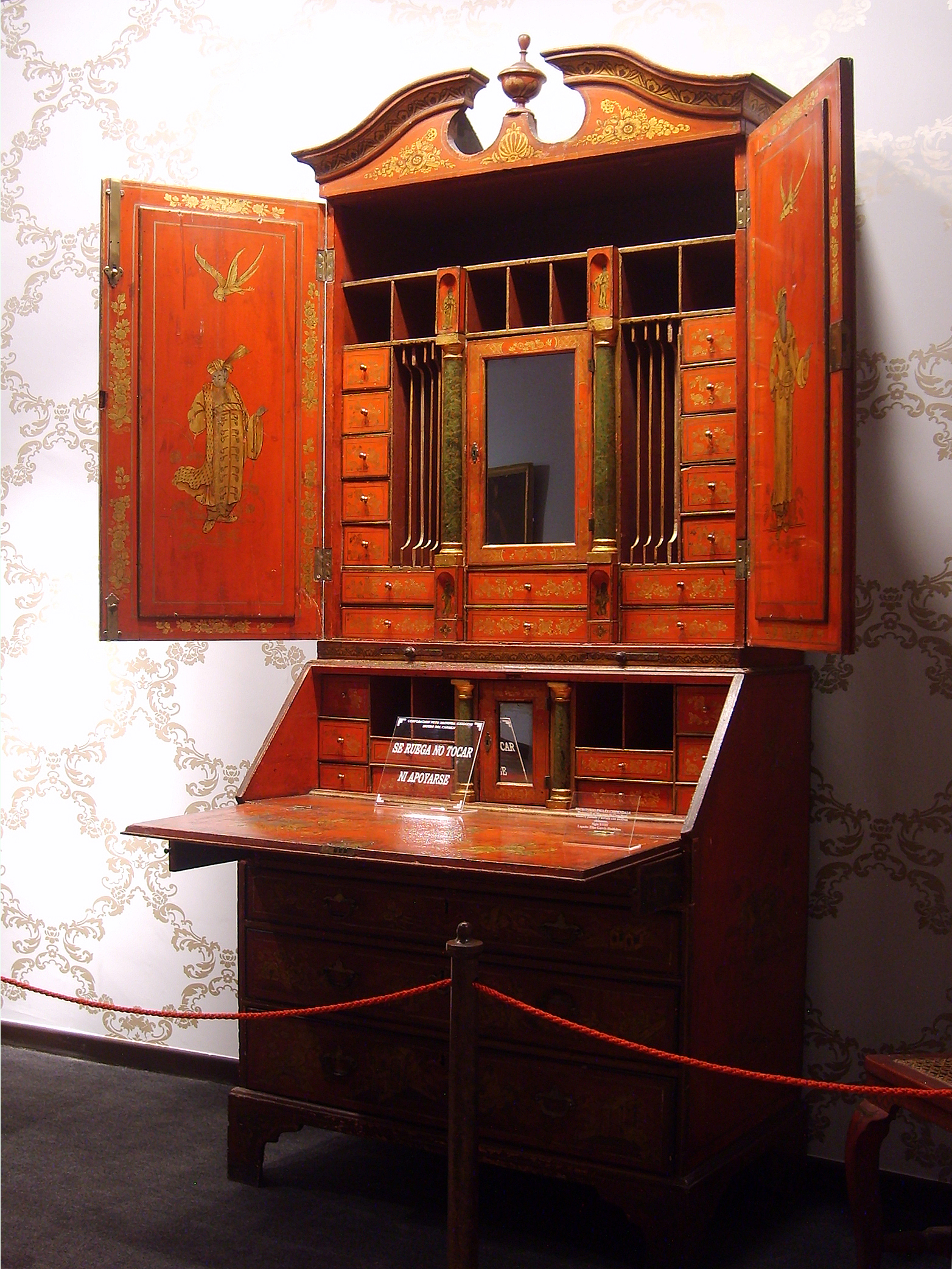
A Chinese Chippendale desk

== Collaborations ==
Chippendale's Director was used by many other cabinet makers. Consequently, recognisably "Chippendale" furniture was produced in Dublin, Philadelphia, Lisbon, Copenhagen and Hamburg. Catherine the Great and Louis XVI both possessed copies of the Director in its French edition. The Director shows four main styles: English with deep carving, elaborate French rococo in the style of Louis XV furniture, Chinese style with latticework and lacquer, and Gothic with pointed arches, quatrefoils and fret-worked legs. His favourite wood was mahogany; in seat furniture he always used solid wood rather than veneers.

== Thomas Chippendale the younger ==
The workshop was continued by his son, Thomas Chippendale, the younger (1749–1822), who worked in the later Neoclassical and Regency styles, "the rather slick delicacy of Adam's final phase", as Christopher Gilbert assessed it. A bankruptcy and sale of remaining stock in the St. Martin's Lane premises in 1804 did not conclude the company's latest phase, as the younger Chippendale supplied furniture to Sir Richard Colt Hoare at Stourhead until 1820.

== Pop culture ==
Created by The Walt Disney Company in 1943, the names Chip 'n' Dale (lead characters in Chip 'n Dale: Rescue Rangers) are a pun on Chippendale. He is briefly mentioned by name in the opening of the 2022 film Chip 'n Dale: Rescue Rangers.

A Chippendale commode is the centre of the story in Roald Dahl's "Parson's Pleasure", a 1980 episode of Tales of the Unexpected.

== See also ==
- Chinese Chippendale (architecture) for architectural details inspired by Chippendale's work
- Chippendale Society
- Thomas Elfe
- List of furniture designers
