= Thomas Chippendale, the younger =

English artist, furniture maker and designer (1749–1822)

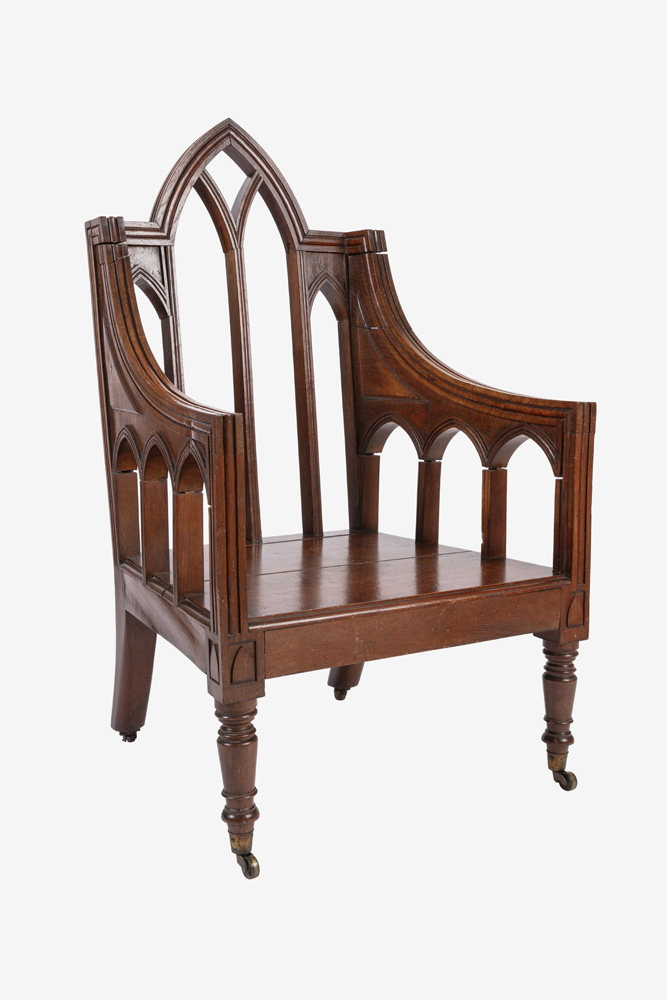
- Born: 1749; London
- Died: 1822 (aged 72–73); London
- Occupation: Painter, artist, Ébéniste
- Works: Open armchair

Thomas Chippendale, the younger (1749–1822) was an English artist, furniture maker and designer, and the eldest of Thomas Chippendale's eleven children. He was devoted to his father and worked with Chippendale Senior until the later died in 1779. Thereafter he took over his father's business until Thomas Chippendale Jr. was obliged to close the doors on the family business. The company, listed in Sheraton's The Cabinet Directory of 1803, went bankrupt in 1804 but was later re-established. Thomas Chippendale was also a member of the Society of Arts and exhibited his paintings at the Royal Academy of Arts between 1784 and 1801.
