= Chō (Tsuki Amano song) =

Single by Tsukiko Amano

from the album Tenryū
- A-side: "Chō"
- B-side: "Zō"
- Released: November 12, 2003
- Recorded: 2003
- Genre: J-pop
- Length: 9:12
- Label: Pony Canyon
- Songwriter: Tsukiko Amano
- Producer: Hirotomo Togura

Tsukiko Amano singles chronology
"Same" (2003)	"Chō" (2003)	"Tsuki" (2004)

Chō is the 7th major single by female J-pop singer-songwriter Tsukiko Amano, from her third major album Tenryū. It was released on November 12, 2003, and reached a peak of No. 49 on the Oricon weekly charts, charting for 8 weeks. The song is a mixture of pop and heavy rock, containing a guitar heavy chorus and interlude. The song was used as the theme song of PlayStation 2 survival horror game Fatal Frame II: Crimson Butterfly. The lyrics of the song tie in with the main themes of the game, and the PV was shot using similar imagery to that seen in-game, including crimson CG butterflies, which can also be seen on the cover. The song was also included on Catalog, Amano's "best of" album.

"Chō" itself is filled with emotional vocals and is slow in tempo; following the tradition of her other singles, the B-side is a parody of the titular song and has more of a "pop" feel.

== Track listing ==
All tracks are written by Tsukiko Amano.

No.	Title	Length
1.	"Chō" (蝶 Butterfly)	5:50
2.	"Zō" (象 Elephant)	4:22
