= Font catalog =

Collection of specimen of typefaces

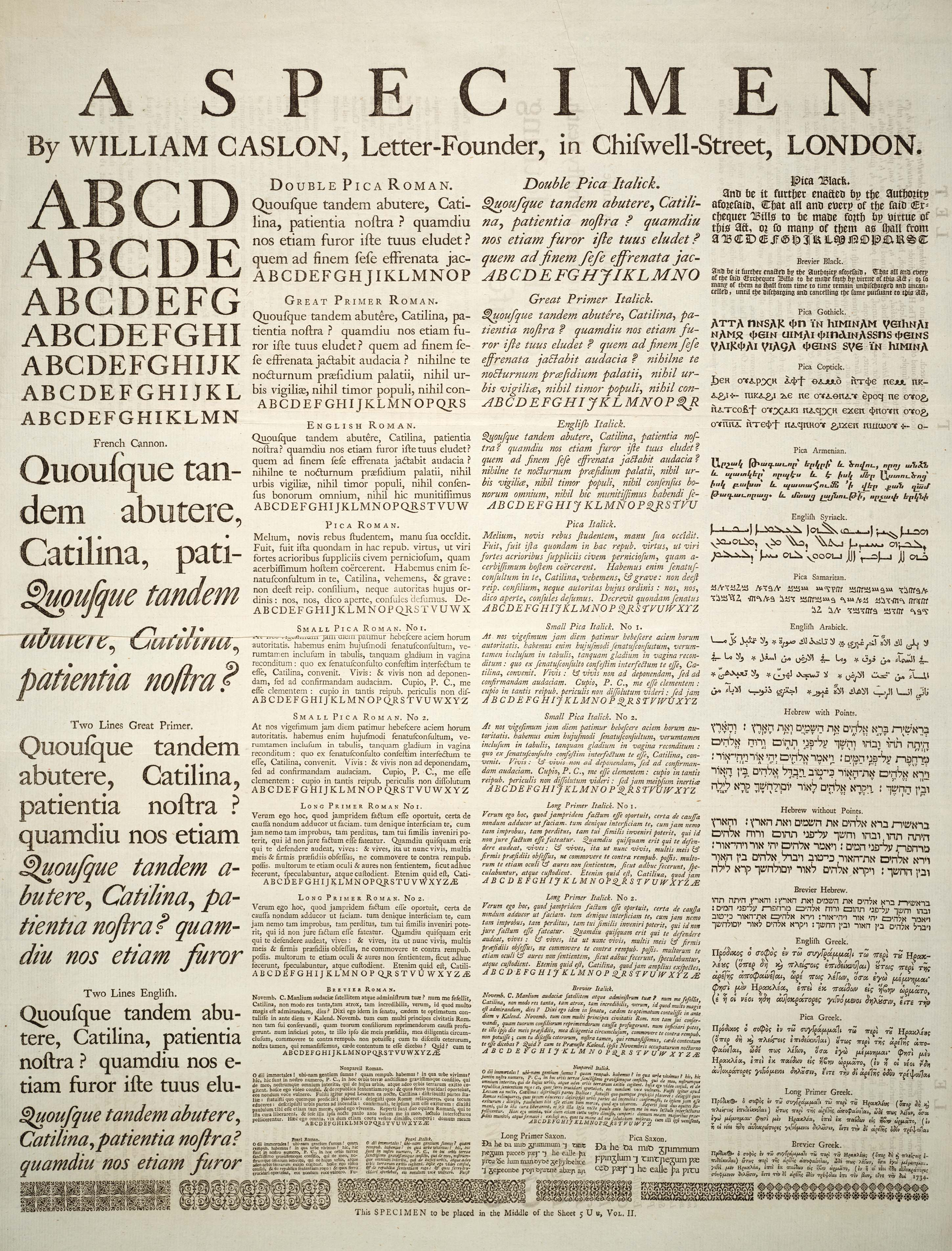
A specimen of roman typefaces by William Caslon

A font catalog or font catalogue, also called a type specimen book, is a collection of specimen of typefaces offering sample use of the fonts for the included typefaces, originally in the form of a printed book. The definition has also been applied to websites offering a specimen collection similar to what a printed catalog provides.

In printed form, they were typically created for type foundries and others who sold type to show what typefaces were available for sale to printers. Printers also made font catalogs to demonstrate the fonts they had on hand for printing projects. In all forms, font catalogs aid typesetters and graphic designers in choosing appropriate typefaces or narrowing down candidates for the typesetting or design process.

== History ==
The first known font catalog was printed by European printer Erhard Ratdolt in 1486.

=== United States ===
The first American font catalog was printed in 1812 for Binny & Ronaldson, a type foundry in Philadelphia. Although they had put out an earlier catalog in 1809, it only contained printing ornaments, with no examples of typefaces.

== Gallery ==
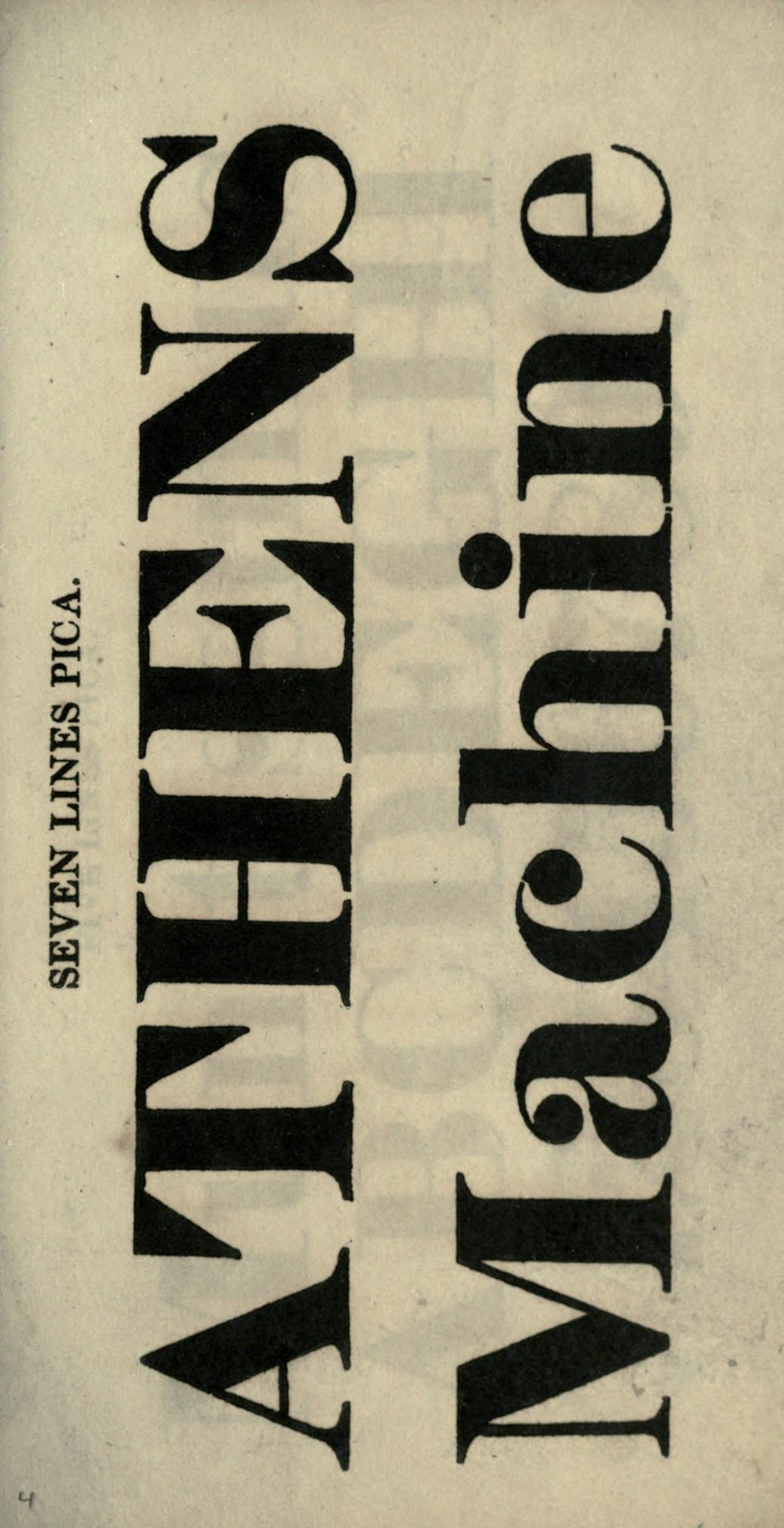
The first font sample in Binny & Ronaldson's first type specimen book from 1812.

== See also ==
- Samples of serif typefaces
- Samples of sans serif typefaces
- Samples of monospaced typefaces
- Samples of display typefaces
- Samples of script typefaces
