= Trade literature =

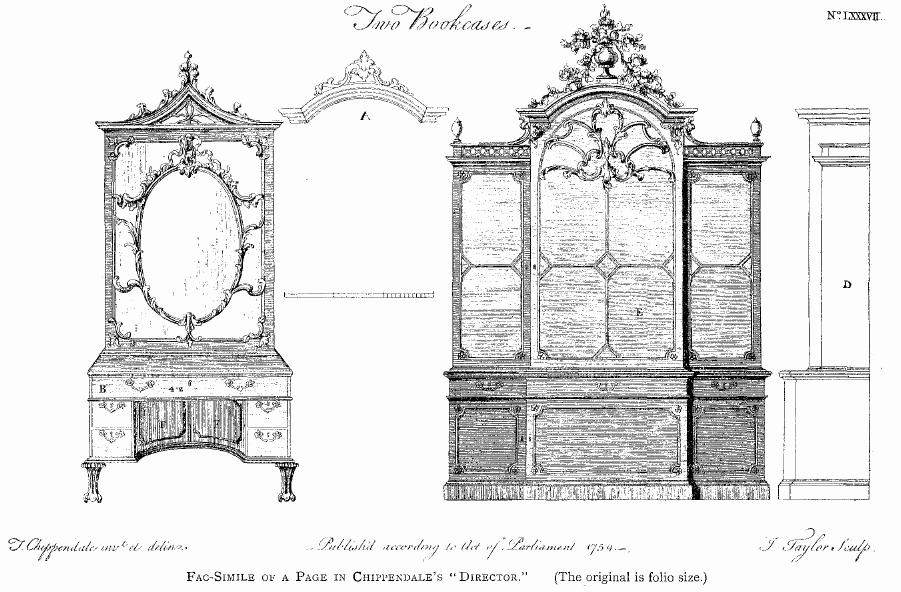
"Two Bookcases", from Chippendale's Director, 1754.

Trade literature is a general term including advertising, customer technical communications, and catalogues.

== Trade journal ==
A trade magazine, or trade rag, also called a professional magazine, is a magazine published with the intention of target marketing to a specific industry or type of trade. The collective term for this area of publishing is the trade press. Trade magazines typically contain advertising content centered on the industry in question with little if any general-audience advertising.

== Trade catalog ==
Definitions of the term "trade catalog" vary, but originally, trade catalogs are printed materials published by manufacturing, wholesaling, or retailing firms. They promote sales by making advertising claims, give instructions in using products, provide testimonials from satisfied customers, and include detailed descriptions of sale products.

Trade catalogs first appeared in the 18th century, with the expansion in trade, commerce and consumption. The distinguished English cabinet maker, Thomas Chippendale published a book of his designs in 1754, entitled The Gentleman and Cabinet Maker's Director and regarded as the "first comprehensive trade catalogue of its kind". The designs were regarded as reflecting the current London fashion for furniture, and set the standard for his competitors in the market. Chippendale followed this up with a virtual reprint in 1755, and finally a revised and enlarged edition in 1762.

"Trade catalog" derives from the expression "to the trade," and the materials were originally produced by manufacturers and wholesalers for their salesmen to market to retailers. The Trade Literature Collection is internationally known as an extraordinary source for the history of American business, technology, marketing, consumption, and design. Trade literature includes printed or handwritten documents, usually illustrated, of items offered for sale, ranging in size from small pamphlets to oversized folios of several hundred pages.

Nowadays, trade catalogs are fully digitized like the open catalogue project Open Icecat.

== Collections ==
- Ball State University Digital Media Repository
  - Architectural Trade Catalogs collection
- Caroline Simpson Library, Museums of History NSW
  - A World of Designs
  - Digitised Trade Catalogues
  - Caroline Simpson Library & Research Collection
- Digital Collections from The Metropolitan Museum of Art Libraries
  - Trade Catalogs collection
- Hagley Museum and Library
  - Digitized trade catalogs
- Science Museum Library & Archives (Wroughton)
  - Trade Literature Collection
- Smithsonian Institution Libraries
  - Historical Seed Nursery Catalogues
  - Instruments for Science, 1800-1914: Scientific Trade Catalogs in Smithsonian Collections
  - Sewing Machines, Historical Trade Literature
- State Technical Library. Prague, Czech Republic
  - Trade Literature Collection
- The Henry Ford - Benson Ford Research Center
  - Research Library - Includes over 30,000 trade literature items representing all types of manufactured goods from automobiles to household goods and more.
- University of California, Santa Barbara
  - Romaine Trade Catalog Collection
- Victoria and Albert Museum
  - Trade Literature Collection in the National Art Library

== Exhibitions ==
- Smithsonian Institution
  - Doodles, Drafts and Designs: Industrial Drawings from the Smithsonian (2004)
