= Tsuki Amano =

Japanese singer

Tsuki Amano 天野 月
- Also known as: Tsukiko Amano, Tsukko
- Origin: Japan
- Genres: Rock, alternative rock
- Occupations: Singer, songwriter
- Instruments: Vocals, guitar, piano
- Years active: 2001–present
- Label: Otokura Records
- Website: www.tsuki-amano.com

Tsuki Amano (天野 月, Amano Tsuki), formerly Tsukiko Amano (天野 月子, Amano Tsukiko), is a Japanese singer, famous for singing the ending themes used in the Fatal Frame series: "Chō" for Fatal Frame II: Crimson Butterfly, and "Koe" for Fatal Frame III: The Tormented, "Kurenai" for Project Zero 2: Wii Edition and "Torikago -in this cage-" for Fatal Frame: Maiden of Black Water. She also sang two songs for Fatal Frame: Mask of the Lunar Eclipse, "Zero no Chōritsu" and "Noise,".

== Biography ==
Amano started playing music at the age of 5, when she started taking piano lessons. She was part of her junior high school chorus club as a soprano, and in high school she began to experiment with various musical instruments and joined the theatre group. It was also in high school where she bought her very first guitar, which is now her primary instrument.

Many of Amano's songs have been used as theme songs for commercials, television shows, movies, and video games. Besides writing all of her own songs, Amano also designs and makes most of the costumes in her videos and performances herself. She has published a storybook she wrote while recording her Ningyō video.

On January 10, 2010, she announced she would be returning to music.

== Discography ==
=== As Tsukiko Amano ===
==== Singles (Indies) ====
Title	Release date
"Hakoniwa" (箱庭; "Miniature Garden"); TV Asahi's "D's Garage" ending theme	June 1, 2001
"Love Dealer"	June 1, 2001
"B.G. Black Guitar+Berry Garden"; Toyota's "Gazoo.com" campaign song	September 1, 2001
"Love Dealer -type 2003-"; TV Tokyo's "Kyūyo Meisai" ending theme	July 30, 2003
"Howling"	April 11, 2007
"Heaven's Gate"	January 23, 2008
"Zero no Chōritsu" (ゼロの調律; "Zero Tune")	July 30, 2008

==== Singles (Major label) ====
Title	Release date
"Bodaiju" (菩提樹; "Linden Tree"); TV Asahi's "Midnight Mermaid" ending theme	November 7, 2001
"Sniper" (スナイパー)	February 20, 2002
"Treasure"; TBS's "Rank ōkoku" opening theme	April 24, 2002
"Honey?"; TV Tokyo's "Cover Shō yo" ending theme	June 19, 2002
"Ningyō" (人形; "Doll"); Nippon TV's "Black Wide Show" ending theme	November 7, 2002
"Same" (鮫; "Shark")	July 30, 2003
"Chō" (蝶; "Butterfly")	November 12, 2003
"Tsuki" (月; "Moon"); Pony Canyon's distributed movie "Moonlight Jellyfish" theme song FBS/Nippon TV's "Akko to Machami no Shingata TV" ending theme	July 14, 2004
"Idea" (イデア); Fuji TV's anime "Konjiki no Gash Bell!!" ending theme	November 3, 2004
"Hisui" (翡翠; "Jade")	February 2, 2005
"Koe" (聲; "Voice")	July 27, 2005
"Karasu" (烏; "Crow")	May 31, 2006
"Utakata" (ウタカタ; "Hourglass") "Next Phase~Kimi Kara no Okurimono" theme song	May 31, 2006
"Konton -chaos-" (混沌 -chaos-; "Chaos -chaos-")	May 31, 2006
"Fukurō" (梟; "Owl")	May 31, 2006
"Fūsen" (風船; "Balloon")	May 31, 2006

==== Albums ====
Title	Release date
Sharon Stones	June 5, 2002
Meg & Lion	December 4, 2002
Tenryū (天龍)	January 21, 2004
Winona Riders (Tsuki no Uragawa); Coupling songs compilation	March 3, 2004
A Moon Child in the Sky	September 21, 2005
Catalog "Best of" album	November 15, 2006
Uma Sāmon (ウマ・サーモン; "Uma Salmon"); Coupling songs compilation	July 23, 2007
Zero	September 3, 2008
Noise "Best of" including indies songs	November 24, 2008

=== As Tsuki Amano ===
==== Singles ====
Title	Release date
"CORE"	January 1, 2011
"Ringo no Ki" (林檎の木; The Apple Tree)	May 11, 2011
"BLACK BEAUTY"	November 18, 2015
"Jubili" (ジュビリー; Jubilee)	September 26, 2019

Digital Singles

Title	Release date
"Hikari no Circus" (ひかりのサーカス; Circus of Light)	January 27, 2010
"Utsukushiki Mono" (うつくしきもの; A Thing of Beauty)	March 17, 2010

==== Albums ====
Title	Release date
Licht	July 7, 2010
Sora no Ki (天の樹; Tree of Heaven)	July 25, 2012
Daisy	September 25, 2013
"Genpuku" (元服; Clothes of Manhood) "Best of" 15th Anniversary album	November 18, 2015
Five Rings	April 1, 2019
19BOX	August 5, 2020

Other Albums

Title	Release date
Peek A Boo; Cover album	May 5, 2010
Appare (天晴; Splendid); Self-cover album	January 1, 2011
Shizuka no Umi (静かの海; Peaceful Sea); Ballad album	November 7, 2012

Mini-Albums

Title	Release date
CHELSEA	February 14, 2011
Bara to Shinju (天の樹; Rose and Pearl)	November 9, 2011
Gomokunarabe (ごもくならべ; Gomoku)	October 1, 2014
