= Catalog (album) =

Compilation album by Tsuki Amano
- Released: February 27, 2006; November 15, 2006 (Deluxe edition)
- Recorded: 2001–2006
- Genres: J-pop, rock
- Length: 70:10 (Standard edition); 1:39:40 (Deluxe edition)
- Labels: Otokura Records, Pony Canyon
- Producer: Hirotomo Togura

Tsuki Amano chronology
A Moon Child In The Sky	Catalog	Uma Sāmon

Alternative cover

Catalog is a "best of" album by Tsukiko Amano, released on February 27, 2006. The album contains every A-side from each of her singles up until 2006. It was released in three editions: a normal, one-CD edition, a limited edition pressing with a card jacket designed by Amano herself, and a Deluxe edition. The Deluxe edition came with an extra CD and DVD, and included the music videos for "Idea", "Hisui", "Koe" and "Love Dealer", as well as making-of footage for Amano's fifth anniversary single releases, part of the 5-five- DVD. Combined sales of the two editions resulted on the album peaking at No. 24 on the Oricon weekly charts, and charting for three weeks. This was Amano's final release with Pony Canyon; after the album's release her contract was terminated, and she returned to indies releases.

== History ==
The album, released to commemorate Amano's fifth anniversary in the music business, was released through Otokura Records and distributed by Pony Canyon. The album was Amano's second compilation album, the first being Winona Riders (Tsuki no Uragawa), a B-sides compilation. The Deluxe edition was released on November 15, 2006. It was later discontinued on March 31, 2007.

The album contained a special application postcard for her then-upcoming "5-five-" DVD, and a lottery ticket qualifying the buyer for a raffle for a Kubrick figure of Amano. All songs on the album were written and composed by Amano herself and arranged by producer Hirotomo Togura, with the exceptions of "Joker Joe", a joint composition with Togura, and "Hisui", arranged by Shin Kono. Amano also chose the track order herself.

== Track listings ==
All tracks are written by Tsukiko Amano.

Disc 1
No.	Title	Album	Length
1.	"Hakoniwa (Miniature Garden)" (箱庭〜ミニチュアガーデン〜 "Sharon Mix" version.)	Sharon Stones	3:07
2.	"Love Dealer-2006-"		3:19
3.	"B.G. (Black Guitar+Berry Garden)"		2:59
4.	"Bodaiju" (菩提樹, "Banyan Tree")		4:32
5.	"Sniper" (スナイパ)		4:00
6.	"Treasure"		2:44
7.	"Honey?"	Sharon Stones	0:55
8.	"Ningyō" (人形, "Doll" "Meg Mix" version.)	Meg & Lion	9:12
9.	"Same" (鮫, "Shark")		2:00
10.	"Chō" (蝶, "Butterfly")		5:56
11.	"Tsuki" (月, "Moon")	Tenryū	2:19
12.	"Idea" (イデア "A Moon Child Mix" version.)	A Moon Child in the Sky	3:01
13.	"Hisui" (翡翠, "Jade"; Arranged by Shin Kono.)		3:33
14.	"Koe" (聲, "Voice")		3:11
Total length:			70:10

All tracks are written by Tsukiko Amano.

Disc 2
No.	Title	Album	Length
1.	"Ao Murasaki" (青紫, "Violet")	Sharon Stones	3:19
2.	"Nichiyōbi" (日曜日, "Sunday")	Meg & Lion	4:16
3.	"Tokedai no Kane" (時計台の鐘, "Clock Tower Bell")	Meg & Lion	2:51
4.	"Koi" (恋, "Love")	Tenryū	4:04
5.	"Ryū" (龍, "Dragon")	Tenryū	4:45
6.	"Joker Joe" (Composed by Tsukiko Amano and Hirotomo Togura.)	A Moon Child in the Sky	3:10
7.	"Stone"	A Moon Child in the Sky	4:01
8.	"Ongaku" (おんがく, "Music")		4:03
Total length:			36:30

DVD
No.	Title	Length
1.	"Idea PV"
2.	"Hisui PV"
3.	"Koe PV"	3:33
4.	"Love Dealer-2006- PV"	3:21
5.	"Bonus Movie" (映像特典, hidden track of the 5-five- PV "making-of" videos. Hidden within track 4.)	2:55
Total length:		23:00
