= List of Battlefield video games =

Battlefield is a video game series developed by DICE, and published by Electronic Arts. The series debuted with the Battlefield 1942. The games take place during historical events, alternate history, and in the future. Gameplay is mainly composed of first-person shooter aspects, with a large emphasis on vehicle combat on land, in the air, and to some extent, the sea. A commercial success, the Battlefield series had sold 4.4 million units as of October 2004.

== Games ==
Game	Details
Battlefield 1942 Original release date(s): NA: September 10, 2002; EU: September 20, 2002	Release years by system: 2002 — Microsoft Windows; 2004 — Mac OS
The Road to Rome Original release date(s): NA: February 2, 2003; EU: February 7, 2003	Release years by system: 2003 — Microsoft Windows
The Road to Rome Original release date(s): NA: February 2, 2003; EU: February 7, 2003	Notes: Battlefield 1942 expansion pack
Secret Weapons of World War II Original release date(s): NA: September 4, 2003; EU: September 5, 2003	Release years by system: 2003 — Microsoft Windows; 2005 — Mac OS
Secret Weapons of World War II Original release date(s): NA: September 4, 2003; EU: September 5, 2003	Notes: Battlefield 1942 expansion pack
Battlefield Vietnam Original release date(s): US: March 14, 2004; PAL: March 19, 2004	Release years by system: 2004 — Microsoft Windows
Battlefield 2 Original release date(s): US: June 21, 2005; PAL: June 24, 2005	Release years by system: 2005 — Microsoft Windows
Special Forces Original release date(s): US: November 22, 2005; PAL: November 24, 2005	Release years by system: 2005 — Microsoft Windows
Special Forces Original release date(s): US: November 22, 2005; PAL: November 24, 2005	Notes: Battlefield 2 expansion pack
Euro Force Original release date(s): March 14, 2006	Release years by system: 2006 — Microsoft Windows
Euro Force Original release date(s): March 14, 2006	Notes: Battlefield 2 booster pack
Armored Fury Original release date(s): June 6, 2006	Release years by system: 2006 — Microsoft Windows
Armored Fury Original release date(s): June 6, 2006	Notes: Battlefield 2 booster pack
Battlefield 2: Modern Combat Original release date(s): NA: October 24, 2005; EU: November 18, 2005; JP: January 26, 2006	Release years by system: 2005 — PS2, Xbox; 2006 — Xbox 360
Battlefield 2: Modern Combat Original release date(s): NA: October 24, 2005; EU: November 18, 2005; JP: January 26, 2006	Notes: Uses RenderWare; A PSP version was planned, but later cancelled.
Battlefield 2142 Original release date(s): October 17, 2006	Release years by system: 2006 — Microsoft Windows, Mac OS X
Northern Strike Original release date(s): March 8, 2007	Release years by system: 2007 — Microsoft Windows, Mac OS X
Northern Strike Original release date(s): March 8, 2007	Notes: Battlefield 2142 booster pack; Later made free to owners of 2142
Battlefield: Bad Company Original release date(s): June 23, 2008	Release years by system: 2008 — PlayStation 3, Xbox 360
Battlefield: Bad Company Original release date(s): June 23, 2008	Notes: First title to use Frostbite
Battlefield Heroes Original release date(s): June 25, 2009	Release years by system: 2009 — Microsoft Windows
Battlefield Heroes Original release date(s): June 25, 2009	Notes: Free-to-play
Battlefield 1943 Original release date(s): July 8, 2009	Release years by system: 2009 — Xbox Live Arcade, PlayStation Network
Battlefield 1943 Original release date(s): July 8, 2009	Notes: There was originally supposed to be a PC version, but it was constantly postponed, until it was finally canceled, to concentrate on development for the upcoming Battlefield 3.
Battlefield: Bad Company 2 Original release date(s): March 2, 2010	Release years by system: 2010 — PlayStation 3, Xbox 360, Microsoft Windows
Battlefield: Bad Company 2 Original release date(s): March 2, 2010	Notes: Beta and Demo released for PC, PS3, and 360; The first game in the series to be rated M (Mature).
Battlefield: Bad Company 2: Vietnam Original release date(s): December 18, 2010	Release years by system: 2010 — PlayStation 3, Microsoft Windows, Xbox 360
Battlefield: Bad Company 2: Vietnam Original release date(s): December 18, 2010	Notes: Battlefield: Bad Company 2 expansion pack
Battlefield Online Original release date(s): March 30, 2010	Release years by system: 2010 — Microsoft Windows
Battlefield Online Original release date(s): March 30, 2010	Notes: Officially launched in Neowiz Pmang
Battlefield Play4Free Original release date(s): April 4, 2011	Release years by system: 2011 — Microsoft Windows
Battlefield Play4Free Original release date(s): April 4, 2011	Notes: Free-To-Play
Battlefield 3 Original release date(s): October 25, 2011	Release years by system: 2011 — PlayStation 3, Xbox 360, Microsoft Windows
Battlefield 3: Back to Karkand Original release date(s): PlayStation 3 December 6, 2011 Microsoft Windows & Xbox 360 December 13, 2011	Release years by system: 2011 — PlayStation 3, Microsoft Windows, Xbox 360
Battlefield 3: Back to Karkand Original release date(s): PlayStation 3 December 6, 2011 Microsoft Windows & Xbox 360 December 13, 2011	Notes: Battlefield 3 expansion pack
Battlefield 3: Close Quarters Original release date(s): June 11, 2012	Release years by system: 2012 — PlayStation 3, Microsoft Windows, Xbox 360
Battlefield 3: Close Quarters Original release date(s): June 11, 2012	Notes: Battlefield 3 expansion pack
Battlefield 3: Armored Kill Original release date(s): September 10, 2012	Release years by system: 2012 — PlayStation 3, Microsoft Windows, Xbox 360
Battlefield 3: Armored Kill Original release date(s): September 10, 2012	Notes: Battlefield 3 expansion pack
Battlefield 3: Aftermath Original release date(s): December 3, 2012	Release years by system: 2012 — PlayStation 3, Microsoft Windows, Xbox 360
Battlefield 3: Aftermath Original release date(s): December 3, 2012	Notes: Battlefield 3 expansion pack
Battlefield 3: End Game Original release date(s): March 12, 2013	Release years by system: 2013 — PlayStation 3, Microsoft Windows, Xbox 360
Battlefield 3: End Game Original release date(s): March 12, 2013	Notes: Battlefield 3 expansion pack
Battlefield 4 Original release date(s): October 29, 2013	Release years by system: 2013 — PlayStation 3, Xbox 360, Microsoft Windows, PlayStation 4, Xbox One
Battlefield 4 Original release date(s): October 29, 2013	Notes: Launch title for PlayStation 4 and Xbox One
Battlefield 4: China Rising Original release date(s): December 17, 2013	Release years by system: 2013 — PlayStation 3, Microsoft Windows, PlayStation 4, Xbox One
Battlefield 4: China Rising Original release date(s): December 17, 2013	Notes: Battlefield 4 expansion [ack
Battlefield 4: Second Assault Original release date(s): February 18, 2014	Release years by system: 2014 — PlayStation 3, Microsoft Windows, PlayStation 4, Xbox One
Battlefield 4: Second Assault Original release date(s): February 18, 2014	Notes: Battlefield 4 expansion pack
Battlefield 4: Naval Strike Original release date(s): April 15, 2014	Release years by system: 2014 — PlayStation 3, Microsoft Windows, PlayStation 4, Xbox One
Battlefield 4: Naval Strike Original release date(s): April 15, 2014	Notes: Battlefield 4 expansion pack
Battlefield 4: Dragon's Teeth Original release date(s): July 15, 2014	Release years by system: 2014 — PlayStation 3, Microsoft Windows, PlayStation 4, Xbox One
Battlefield 4: Dragon's Teeth Original release date(s): July 15, 2014	Notes: Battlefield 4 expansion pack
Battlefield 4: Final Stand Original release date(s): November 18, 2014	Release years by system: 2014 — PlayStation 3, Microsoft Windows, PlayStation 4, Xbox One
Battlefield 4: Final Stand Original release date(s): November 18, 2014	Notes: Battlefield 4 expansion pack
Battlefield Hardline Original release date(s): March 17, 2015	Release years by system: 2015 — PlayStation 3, Xbox 360, Microsoft Windows, PlayStation 4, Xbox One
Battlefield Hardline Original release date(s): March 17, 2015	Notes: A spin-off developed by Visceral Games and additional work done by DICE.
Battlefield Hardline: Criminal Activity Original release date(s): June 16, 2015	Release years by system: 2015 — PlayStation 3, Xbox 360, Microsoft Windows, PlayStation 4, Xbox One
Battlefield Hardline: Criminal Activity Original release date(s): June 16, 2015	Notes: Battlefield Hardline expansion pack
Battlefield Hardline: Robbery Original release date(s): September 16, 2015	Release years by system: 2015 — PlayStation 3, Xbox 360, Microsoft Windows, PlayStation 4, Xbox One
Battlefield Hardline: Robbery Original release date(s): September 16, 2015	Notes: Battlefield Hardline expansion pack
Battlefield Hardline: Getaway Original release date(s): January 12, 2016	Release years by system: 2016 — PlayStation 3, Xbox 360, Microsoft Windows, PlayStation 4, Xbox One
Battlefield Hardline: Getaway Original release date(s): January 12, 2016	Notes: Battlefield Hardline expansion pack
Battlefield Hardline: Betrayal Original release date(s): March 1, 2016	Release years by system: 2016 — PlayStation 3, Xbox 360, Microsoft Windows, PlayStation 4, Xbox One
Battlefield Hardline: Betrayal Original release date(s): March 1, 2016	Notes: Battlefield Hardline expansion pack
Battlefield 1 Original release date(s): October 21, 2016	Release years by system: 2016 — Microsoft Windows, PlayStation 4, Xbox One
Battlefield 1: They Shall Not Pass Original release date(s): March 14, 2017	Release years by system: 2017 — Microsoft Windows, PlayStation 4, Xbox One
Battlefield 1: They Shall Not Pass Original release date(s): March 14, 2017	Notes: Battlefield 1 expansion pack
Battlefield 1: In the Name of the Tsar Original release date(s): September 5, 2017	Release years by system: 2017 — Microsoft Windows, PlayStation 4, Xbox One
Battlefield 1: In the Name of the Tsar Original release date(s): September 5, 2017	Notes: Battlefield 1 expansion pack
Battlefield 1: Turning Tides Original release date(s): December 11, 2017	Release years by system: 2017 — Microsoft Windows, PlayStation 4, Xbox One
Battlefield 1: Turning Tides Original release date(s): December 11, 2017	Notes: Battlefield 1 expansion pack
Battlefield 1: Apocalypse Original release date(s): February 20, 2018	Release years by system: 2018 — Microsoft Windows, PlayStation 4, Xbox One
Battlefield 1: Apocalypse Original release date(s): February 20, 2018	Notes: Battlefield 1 expansion pack
Battlefield V Original release date(s): November 20, 2018	Release years by system: 2018 — Microsoft Windows, PlayStation 4, Xbox One
Battlefield 2042 Original release date(s): November 19, 2021	Release years by system: 2021 — Microsoft Windows, PlayStation 5, Xbox Series X/S, PlayStation 4, Xbox One
Battlefield 6 Original release date(s): October 10, 2025	Release years by system: 2025 — Microsoft Windows, PlayStation 5, Xbox Series X/S
Battlefield Mobile Original release date(s): November 2022 (early access)	Release years by system: cancelled — Android
