= BF42 =

BF42 may refer to:

- Battlefield 1942
- Battlefield 2042
- Battlefield 2142
