= Stepping Grounds =

Stepping Grounds is an arts and culture management company founded by Patrick Marín in 2009. After graduating from the Royal Conservatory of the Hague, Marín joined Nederland's Dans Theater 2 in 1993. Marín established Stepping Grounds in The Hague, Netherlands, representing artists worldwide in the performing arts.

== Artists ==
Artists supported by Stepping Grounds are:

=== Choreographers ===
- Alexander Ekman
- Marina Mascarell
- Rafael Bonachela
- Anouk van Dijk
- fr:Thierry Malandain
- Martin Harriague
- Juanjo Arques

=== Composers ===
- Dirk Haubrich
- Chris Lancaster
- Mikael Karlsson
