= Battlefield Online =

2010 video game

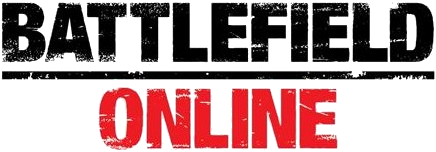
- Developers: Neowiz, DICE
- Publisher: Neowiz
- Series: Battlefield
- Platform: Microsoft Windows
- Release: KOR: March 30, 2010
- Genre: First-person shooter
- Mode: Multiplayer

Battlefield Online (Korean: 배틀필드 온라인) was a free online first person shooter developed by Neowiz Games, Electronic Arts and DICE, and distributed by Neowiz Games. It is the tenth installment in the Battlefield series. It was a remake of Battlefield 2, however, its game engine was Battlefield 2142's modified Refractor Engine 2, with graphic-improvements over Battlefield 2.

== Development and release ==
Battlefield Online was developed by Neowiz Games of South Korea with oversight from license-holder Electronic Arts. Having started its second beta test, the game supported multi-player player versus player matches with up to 100 players simultaneously.

The open beta testing of the game was started on March 25, 2010. The game servers were shut down on May 21, 2013.
