= Battlefield 2: Modern Combat =

2005 video game

- Developer: DICE
- Publisher: Electronic Arts
- Writer: Jeremy Drysdale
- Composers: Rupert Gregson-Williams; Tobias Marberger
- Series: Battlefield
- Engine: RenderWare / Proprietary
- Platforms: PlayStation 2, Xbox, Xbox 360
- Release: PlayStation 2 & Xbox: NA: October 25, 2005; EU: November 18, 2005; Xbox 360: NA: April 11, 2006; EU: April 14, 2006
- Genre: First-person shooter
- Modes: Single-player, multiplayer

Battlefield 2: Modern Combat is a 2005 first-person shooter game developed by DICE and published by Electronic Arts. It is the fourth installment in the Battlefield series. Modern Combat is the first Battlefield game for video game consoles and the first to offer a full single-player campaign. Despite its name, the game is neither a port nor a spin-off of Battlefield 2, which was in development at the same time.

The game was titled Battlefield: Modern Combat until shortly before release, when the numeral was added to evoke a connection with the PC game Battlefield 2, in an attempt to boost sales. The original name was notably used as in game advertising in 2004's Burnout 3: Takedown as the game was originally scheduled to release in fall 2004 as a multiplayer only game. However the game release was later delayed to Fall 2005 due to the addition of the single-player campaign.

The game was initially released for the PlayStation 2 and Xbox in 2005. In 2006, an updated version of the game was released for the Xbox 360, featuring improved graphics and online features. A PlayStation Portable version was developed by EA Bright Light and announced in 2005, but was cancelled.

Battlefield 2: Modern Combat multiplayer on Xbox was shut down on April 15, 2010, as a result of the discontinuation of the Xbox Live service. The Xbox 360 version's multiplayer was shut down by EA the following year on August 11, 2011, due to dwindling player numbers. The PS2 version remained playable online on official servers until the GameSpy online service was shut down on June 30, 2014, although it is still playable via fan-made servers. The single-player campaign mode is still playable on all platforms. The Xbox version had the ability to download the "Warsome Booster Pack" via Xbox Live for free.

== Plot ==
The single-player campaign game revolves around a fictional war between NATO and China that takes place in Kazakhstan. The media on both sides air propaganda that accuses the other of war crimes while the player fights for each nation back and forth. When the player eventually chooses a side to lead to victory, it is revealed that a terrorist organization called Burning Flag is responsible for misleading both NATO and China into starting the war. Various war crimes each side believes the other committed during the fighting were in fact arranged by Burning Flag, which also sabotaged the only known attempt at negotiations. The winning side must then stop Burning Flag's leader, Commander 31, from launching 3 nuclear ICBMs at the United States, Europe, and China; failure would mean neither side would have anything left to fight for or live for. During the course of an intense battle, the ICBM launches are halted and Commander 31 killed, with the player being hailed as the hero who made China's- or NATO's- victory possible.

== Multiplayer gameplay ==
The Multiplayer mode offers two game modes, Conquest, returning from previous games in the series, and the new Capture the Flag game mode. Both support a total of 24 players.

There are four playable factions, the United States Marine Corps (USMC), the European Union (EU), the People's Liberation Army (PLA) and the fictitious Middle Eastern Coalition (MEC). Which faction faces which is determined by the map being played of which there are thirteen in the game, ranging from desert towns to secret Chinese airfields. Three additional maps were later made available for the Xbox and Xbox 360 versions.

=== Conquest ===
In Conquest, the goal is to capture a majority of the flags scattered across the map. There are two counters, which show the tickets remaining on either side. The tickets decrease by 1 for each time a player spawns after death or the initial spawn on the corresponding side, and by progressively more, depending on the number of flags either team has. The more flags one team has, the faster the other's tickets will decrease. If there is only one member alive and all flags have been taken by the other team, the tickets will decrease rapidly until the person is killed or has taken a flag. If both sides have an equal number of flags, neither team's tickets will decrease, unless a member of one team dies, in which case one ticket is subtracted from the victim's team. Vehicles are readily available in this mode, and there are multiple types of maps, such as "Incursion" maps, in which every flag owned by only one of the teams is capture-able.

=== Capture the flag ===
In Capture the flag, players battle on a scaled down version of any one of the maps. There are only two positions, one on each side, which house each team's flag. There are multiple spawns in each position. Instead of the flags being mounted on flagpoles, as in Conquest mode, they are instead small flags perched on small bases. When a player walks over a flag, it is automatically picked up. The player carrying it must return it to their own base. The flag may only be captured if the capturing team's flag is still at their base, and not taken by their opponent. If the player carrying the flag is killed, one of his teammates may pick up the flag he dropped when he died and continue taking it to their base or an enemy may run over it, at which point the flag is automatically returned safely to their base.

Online play also supports the clan option. A single person can create a clan and invite other players into the clan, they are also able to promote, demote, and kick members as well. Customizable options include the clan name, clan motto, and clan news. Both gamemodes are accepted on the clan feature. In starting a clan match is when a challenge gets accepted or, the leader needs someone to "back" him, this means as soon as the challenge is accepted a teammate must check for a clan game and quickly join it in order for the clan match to take place.

=== Downloadable content ===
A pack of three additional maps was made available for download on December 22, 2005, for Xbox Live users. These same three maps were later included on disc for the updated Xbox 360 version.

== Reception ==
Reception

Aggregate score
| Aggregator | Score | | |
| Aggregator | PS2 | Xbox | Xbox 360 |
|---|---|---|---|
| Metacritic | 80/100 | 80/100 | 77/100 |

Review scores
| Publication | Score | | |
| Publication | PS2 | Xbox | Xbox 360 |
|---|---|---|---|
| Edge | 8/10 | 8/10 | N/A |
| Electronic Gaming Monthly | 8.33/10 | 8.33/10 | 7.83/10 |
| Eurogamer | N/A | 7/10 | 8/10 |
| Famitsu | 31/40 | N/A | 32/40 |
| Game Informer | 7.5/10 | 7.5/10 | 7.75/10 |
| GamePro | 3.5/5 | 3.5/5 | 4/5 |
| GameRevolution | B+ | B+ | B |
| GameSpot | 7.3/10 | 7.3/10 | 7.5/10 |
| GameSpy | 3.5/5 | 3.5/5 | 4/5 |
| GameTrailers | N/A | N/A | 7.7/10 |
| GameZone | 8.2/10 | 8/10 | 8/10 |
| IGN | 8.5/10 | 8.5/10 | 7.9/10 |
| Official U.S. PlayStation Magazine | 4/5 | N/A | N/A |
| Official Xbox Magazine (US) | N/A | 7.5/10 | 7/10 |
| Detroit Free Press | 3/4 | N/A | N/A |
| The Sydney Morning Herald | 4/5 | 4/5 | N/A |

Battlefield 2: Modern Combat received "generally favorable reviews" on all platforms according to the review aggregation website Metacritic. In Japan, where the PlayStation 2 version was ported for release on January 26, 2006, followed by the Xbox 360 version on March 30, 2006, Famitsu gave the former console version a score of three eights and one seven for a total of 31 out of 40, while Famitsu X360 gave the latter console version a score of one nine, two eights, and one seven for a total of 32 out of 40.
