= Battlefield 1942: Secret Weapons of WWII =

2003 video game expansion

- Developer: DICE
- Publisher: EA Games
- Series: Battlefield
- Engine: Refractor 1
- Platforms: Microsoft Windows, Mac OS X
- Release: Windows: NA: 4 September 2003; EU: 5 September 2003; Mac OS X: WW: 25 October 2004
- Genre: First-person shooter
- Modes: Single-player, multiplayer

Battlefield 1942: Secret Weapons of WWII is the second of two expansions to the World War II first-person shooter computer game Battlefield 1942. It was released for Microsoft Windows on 4 September 2003 in North America and 5 September 2003 in Europe. It was also released for Mac OS X on 25 October 2004.

Secret Weapons of WWII brings many new features to the original game, such as new weapons, vehicles, battles, factions, and a new gameplay mode that focuses on fulfilling objectives more than destroying the enemy army. These new features help to bring variety to its predecessor's gameplay without overhauling the series. For example, while an Allied engineer may still maintain his original role as being able to repair vehicles, his long-ranged rifle has been replaced with a shotgun, which is effective at short distances.

== Gameplay ==
A screenshot of the jet pack

As in Battlefield 1942, players play the role of a soldier in a two-sided battle and can choose which weapons and/or vehicles they want to use in accomplishing this task of victory on the battlefield. Usually, the team that works together more effectively wins by reducing the enemies' tickets to zero in a classic "Conquest" mode. (A team loses tickets when its members are killed, but also when the other team holds a majority of the capture points on a map.) Even more so than in Battlefield 1942, the weapons in Secret Weapons of WWII are designed to be used in unison with other weapons to compensate for weaknesses and maximize strengths.

A gameplay mode introduced in Secret Weapons of WWII is an objective-based mode in which players focus on accomplishing specific objectives to win the battle. For example, on Essen, the German forces must prevent Allied forces from destroying key portions of a weapons factory. If the Allied forces successfully fulfill these objectives, the German tickets are drastically reduced, usually winning the game for the Allies.

The default Allied (US) Army and Axis (German) Army have received new weapons and vehicles in addition to the creation of two entirely new factions, the SAS (British Commandos) and the German Elite Troops (the Waffen-SS and the Fallschirmjager). The accompanying update package 1.41 introduces an additional three new factions, USMC, RAF, and Luftwaffe. Each faction has unique weapons to their faction that can only be obtained by playing as that faction or picking them off a fallen enemy soldier. They also have unique vehicles that are only available at their bases. Even with the creation of these new factions, all the maps in the expansion pack are Axis versus Allies, as is the custom in the Battlefield series.

Also of special note is the Jet Pack, which allows players to fly in the air while firing a weapon. To maintain gameplay balance, the Jet Pack is very susceptible to blowing up while under fire, instantly killing the player. As opposed to other weapons, the Jet Pack is not unique to one faction, and instead, it can be found at one or more locations throughout a particular map as an item that replaces the player's current equipment. However, there are only four maps which have the Jet Pack in them.

== Development ==
The expansion pack was officially announced at E3 2003; although, there was significant speculation preceding the announcement that Electronic Arts was making a second expansion pack to Battlefield 1942. Nearly six months later Battlefield 1942: Secret Weapons of WWII began to be sold at stores for thirty dollars, ten dollars more than the originally conceived twenty dollar price tag. This sometimes negatively affected reviews.

== Reception ==
Reception

Aggregate score
Aggregator	Score
Metacritic	79/100

Review scores
Publication	Score
Computer Gaming World	4.5/5
Eurogamer	7/10
Game Informer	8.75/10
GamesMaster	71%
GameSpot	8.2/10
GameSpy	3/5
GameZone	9.1/10
IGN	8.8/10
PC Gamer (US)	90%
X-Play	4/5

Battlefield 1942: Secret Weapons of WWII received "generally favorable reviews", albeit less than the original Battlefield 1942 or The Road to Rome, according to the review aggregation website Metacritic.

Almost all reviews reflected positively on the amount of variety added to the game without turning players off from the original draw of the series. GameSpy listed as a pro that it had "lots of fun new vehicles; some outstanding new maps." GameSpot said that "its additions are extremely enjoyable to play around with and, in some cases, really change the gameplay of the original in new and intriguing ways." IGN noted that "the new super weapons are brilliantly incorporated in to the gameplay."

Criticisms included that the proportion of content to retail price was too low. In GameSpot's review of the game, it claimed, "considering how much it retails for, it probably could have offered more." GameSpy listed as the con that "some of the maps are clunkers; $30 is too much for the limited content here." Also, some critics disliked the fanciful nature of many of the new weapons and vehicles introduced by the expansion. IGN summarized its reaction in its review of the game: "Secret Weapons of WWII, while based in historical equipment and encounters, nevertheless offers up a steroid-enhanced version of the regular game with plenty of new weapons that were on the cutting edge of technology (or merely on the drawing board) at the close of the Second World War. For some players this extra touch of Hollywood seems a bit out of place relative to the previous games."

The editors of Computer Gaming World presented Secret Weapons of WWII with their 2003 "Expansion Pack of the Year" award. They wrote, "It's good to see that the folks at Digital Illusions didn't rest on their laurels when putting together this add-on."

At the first Spike Video Game Awards in 2003, Secret Weapons of WWII was nominated in the "Best First Person Action" category, but lost to Call of Duty; at the AIAS' 7th Annual Interactive Achievement Awards, it also received a nomination for "Computer First-Person Action Game of the Year", yet ultimately lost to Call of Duty as well.
