= Mikael Karlsson (composer) =

Swedish composer (born 1975)

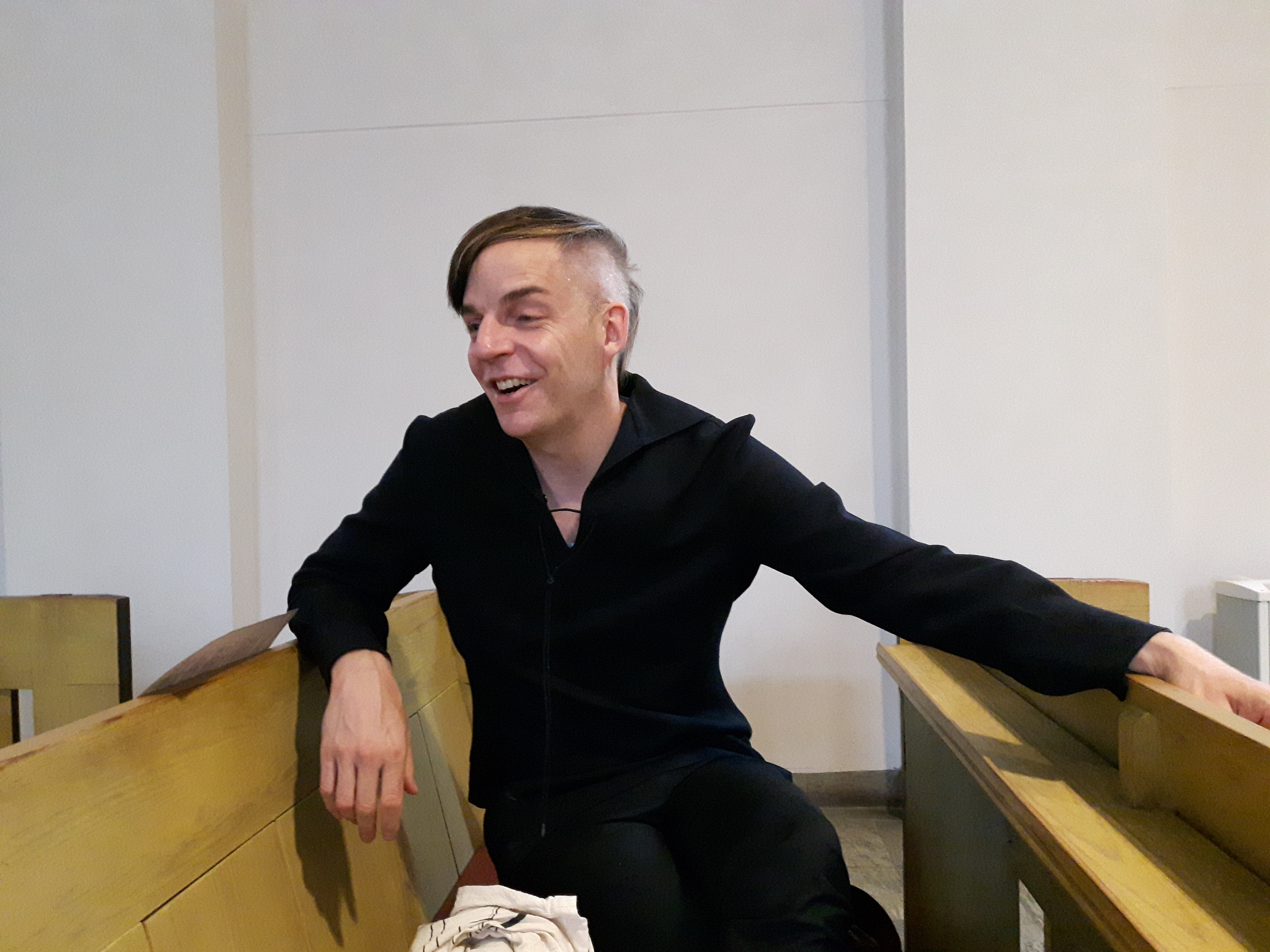
Mikael Karlsson

Mikael Karlsson (Johan Mikael Karlsson; born August 12, 1975, in Halmstad, Sweden) is a Swedish composer based in New York City. He grew up in Gävle, Sweden and moved to NYC in 2001 to study and he took a master's degree in classical composition at the Aaron Copland School of Music 2005.

Before the move, he had come to know Stefan Strandberg, who became the audio designer of the video game developer Digital Illusions CE which led to a request to make the music to Battlefield: Bad Company released in 2008. He also wrote the music for Battlefield: Bad Company 2.

Mikael Karlsson has collaborated with the choreographer Alexander Ekman on several occasions. He has, among other things, written music for Ekman's ballets and sets of Tyll and Midsummer Night's Dream at the Royal Opera in Stockholm, Sweden and Swan Lake on the Oslo Opera in Oslo, Norway. They became good friends when Ekman's sister moved into the apartment that Karlsson inhabited in NYC.

Mikael Karlsson has, in addition to classic sets, also made music for film and TV and collaborated with pop artists such as Andreas Kleerup, Lykke Li and Alicia Keys.

In 2014, he was praised by the American Academy of Arts and Letters when he received the Wladimir and Rhoda Lakond Award as "outstanding composer in the middle of his career".

In 2023, Karlsson's opera Melancholia, after the film of the same name by Lars von Trier, was premiered by the Royal Swedish Opera.

In December 2024, his opera with librettist Royce Vevrek “Fanny and Alexander” based on Ingmar Bergman’s film, premiered at the Brussels Royal Opera house La Monnaie.

== Discography ==
- Dog (with Rob Stephensson), 2006
- Battlefield Bad Company (Official Soundtrack), 2008
- Privacy 2008
- Life Class (for François Rousseau's Atelier), 2009
- Instead EP, 2009
- Battlefield Bad Company 2 (Official Soundtrack), 2010
- Seven Eight EP, 2010
- On This Planet (for Cedar Lake Contemporary Ballet by Benoit-Swan Pouffer), 2010
- Day Comes Apart (song cycle), 2010
- Nattvittje (string quartet), 2011
- Ends (the score for the Cedar Lake Contemporary Ballet performance on So You Think You Can Dance), single, 2012
- Tyll (an Alexander Ekman Ballet for the Royal Swedish Ballet), EP, 2012
- Phantasmata Domestica (with Black Sun Productions), Old Europa Cafe, 2012
- A Swan Lake (Alexander Ekman's A Swan Lake premiered at the Oslo Opera House), 2014
- Midsummer Night’s Dream (two songs from Alexander Ekman's full evening ballet, performed by Anna von Hausswolff), 2015
- Cow (the music to Alexander Ekman's ballet for the Semperoper Ballett in Dresden, Germany), 2016
- The Echo Drift (a chamber opera, performed live at the Prototype Festival), 2018
- Paper Plane (the score to Mari Carrasco's dance piece for Riksteatern, Sweden), 2018
- Internally Black (written for Mari Carrasco's piece Svart Invärtes for Norrdans), Rough State Sound, 2018
- Black Forrest (the score to Mari Carrasco's dance piece “Black Forest” for Norrdans)
- The Eskapist (Alexander Ekman's Contemporary Ballet performance, Royal Swedish Ballet, 2019)
