= Battlefield 1942: The Road to Rome =

2003 video game expansion pack

- Developer: DICE
- Publisher: EA Games
- Series: Battlefield
- Platform: Microsoft Windows
- Release: NA: 4 February 2003; EU: 7 February 2003
- Genre: First-person shooter
- Modes: Single-player, multiplayer

Battlefield 1942: The Road to Rome is an expansion pack for the Battlefield 1942 video game. It was released in February 2003 by Electronic Arts and developed by DICE. Six maps featuring battles that took place in Italy were added (such as Operation Husky and the Battle of Anzio), along with eight vehicles, including the German Bf 110 and the British Mosquito fighter-bombers and the M3 Grant medium tank. French and Italian forces are included. Engineers can mount a bayonet on their rifle for hand-to-hand combat. The Italian Breda 30 and the British Sten SMG have been added. Extra scenes are added to the original Battlefield 1942 intro.

== Reception ==
Reception

Aggregate score
Aggregator	Score
Metacritic	84/100

Review scores
Publication	Score
Computer Games Magazine	4/5
Computer Gaming World	4/5
EP Daily	8/10
Eurogamer	6/10
GameSpot	8.9/10
GameSpy	4.5/5
GameZone	8.5/10
IGN	9.1/10
PC Gamer (US)	90%
X-Play	3/5
The Cincinnati Enquirer	4/4

Battlefield 1942: The Road to Rome received "favorable" reviews according to the review aggregation website Metacritic. What was criticized was the lack of new multiplayer modes, lack of new weapons, (having only the Breda 30 for the Italians and the Sten Mk.II for the British and French), and no stability increases. A favored feature were the map designs.
