= Battlefield: Bad Company =

2008 video game

- Developer: DICE
- Publisher: Electronic Arts
- Producers: Karl-Magnus Troedsson; Patrick Bach; Jamie Keen; Bjorn Johnsson; Patrick Liu
- Designers: Lars Gustavsson; Patrick Bach; David Goldfarb; Jamie Keen
- Programmer: Henrik Karlsson
- Artist: Jens Oras
- Writer: Fredrik Agetoft
- Composer: Mikael Karlsson
- Series: Battlefield
- Engine: Frostbite 1.0
- Platforms: PlayStation 3, Xbox 360
- Release: NA: 23 June 2008; EU/AU: 26 June 2008; UK: 27 June 2008
- Genres: First-person shooter, tactical shooter
- Modes: Single-player, multiplayer

Battlefield: Bad Company is a 2008 first-person shooter game developed by DICE and published by Electronic Arts for the PlayStation 3 and Xbox 360. It is the sixth installment in the Battlefield series. It was released in North America on 23 June 2008, followed by a European release on 26 June.

While previous installments were mostly released for PCs, Bad Company was the first game to be developed for consoles and feature a full single-player campaign. Its story follows protagonist Private Preston Marlowe and his exploits to steal gold from mercenaries along with his squad in the midst of a war between the United States and Russia.

The game emphasizes squad-based combat, while retaining the vehicular and large-scale multiplayer warfare of the previous entries. It also marks DICE's debut of its studio-developed Frostbite engine, which allows for highly-destructible environments, such as the ability to blow holes through walls. The engine has since been updated and used in later titles.

Bad Company received mostly positive reviews from critics, who praised the story's humor and technical aspects such as sound, atmosphere and the game engine. A sequel, Battlefield: Bad Company 2, was released in 2010.

== Gameplay ==
The player is able to use their weapon to damage the environment, enabling the player to create ambush sites or take out a sniper's cover.

In the game, players can hold one primary weapon which each has its own secondary, along with a combat knife, grenades and other picked up explosives and devices. Players start with 100 health, which is reduced by damage. Wounded players heal by using the LIFE-2 auto-injector. The environment is almost entirely destructible, but bullets cannot go through most walls. The ammunition system uses a bullet calculator, shown on the HUD, and players can endlessly repair vehicles with power tools unless they are completely destroyed. Airstrikes and Mortar Strikes can also be utilized.

Battlefield: Bad Company has an assortment of military vehicles from each of the game's three factions that can be used by the player. Tanks, infantry fighting vehicles, armored cars, attack helicopters, patrol boats, mobile anti-aircraft weapon system. Unlike some previous versions in the Battlefield series, fixed-wing aircraft such as fighter jets and bomber planes are not available in this game.

The Frostbite game engine allows 90% of the environment to be destroyed, including buildings, vegetation (including trees, grass, and bushes), vehicles, other players and the ground itself. For gameplay purposes, the frames of some buildings and objects remain indestructible to prevent total destruction of key points and to prevent the map from being completely flat. Additionally, the game features dynamic lighting to correlate with the changing environment.

=== Multiplayer ===
Multiplayer supports up to 24 players. Gold Rush was the only multiplayer mode included in the initial release of Battlefield: Bad Company. The setup of the game is an Attackers vs. Defenders scenario. The eight initial maps are Harvest Day, Over and Out, End of the Line, Ascension, Valley Run, Deconstruction, Oasis, and Final Ignition, each with destructible environments, certain atmospheres, and vehicles. One team must defend two crates filled with gold while the other team attempts to destroy the crates. Once the crates are destroyed, more of the map is available to fight on with new crates appearing, along with added reinforcement numbers. The attacking team has a limited amount of respawns to achieve their goal of capturing the 3-5 gold stashes either by setting charges or simply destroying the two crates of gold at each base. The defending team has an unlimited amount of respawns available, but their goal is to exhaust the attacking teams respawns.

The Conquest game mode returned to Bad Company due to overwhelming requests from players during the beta testing. Conquest was the prevalent game-mode in many of the preceding Battlefield games, and involves reducing the opponents' "ticket" meter by scoring kills and capturing strategically placed flags. This mode was available as a free download post-launch, the release date was 7 August 2008. The Conquest pack included modified versions of the Ascension, End of the Line, Oasis and Harvest Day maps.

A new map pack featuring more conquest maps, and trophies for both offline and online play on the PlayStation 3 version, was released on 30 October 2008, and the Xbox 360 version releasing on 31 October 2008. The maps included 4 modified singleplayer maps such as Acta non Verba, Ghost Town, Par for the Course, and Crossing Over.

The game has 25 ranks, each from the U.S. Army (corporal, sergeant, colonel etc.). Unlock credits may be obtained by ranking up and then the aforementioned credits may be used to unlock weapons. However, the weapons included with the Find All Five program may not be unlocked using these credits. Unlock credits are not granted with every rank. A particular selection of five weapons may be unlocked only by ranking up to Rank 25 or by purchasing the Gold Edition.

Players can earn different types of awards. Trophies are awarded for multiple kills in a certain class, kills to defend an objective and for other team-related actions. These can be awarded to the player multiple times during the game. Patches can be earned for gaining certain trophies and then completing certain criteria in an online match. Patches can only be awarded once to a player. Wildcards are awarded once to a player for a combination of many different criteria. These are harder than trophies and patches to unlock. In addition to these in-game awards, the game is compatible with achievements for the Xbox 360 and trophies for the PlayStation 3.

In a move similar to Battlefield 2142, the number of soldier classes is small compared to previous games in the series, resulting in a combination of the classic soldier classes. The classes in this game are:

- Assault, an all-around good soldier class, armed with an assault rifle, a 40 mm grenade launcher and the ability to heal himself
- Demolition, an anti-vehicle soldier equipped with a shotgun, a rocket launcher, and anti-vehicle land mines
- Recon, a long range class with a sniper rifle, a handgun, a throwable motion sensor and guided smart bomb
- Specialist, a close-range class with a suppressed submachine gun and C4 for destroying objects and environments that can be destroyed, or vehicles such as tanks and armored cars.
- Support, an anti-personnel class with a light machine gun, large ammo capacity, healing equipment for soldiers and vehicles, and an unlockable mortar strike device to call in a bombardment on a particular area.

Each class wields a main weapon of choice (maximum of five optional guns per class), three secondary weapons/gadgets, and a knife for quick kills. With a knife one can rank up faster than with any other weapon, since one receives both the standard points for a kill as well as the slain player's dog tags (which grant a hefty point bonus, depending on their level).

== Plot ==
=== Setting ===
The game is set in the near future and focuses on a war between the United States and Russia near the fictional country of Serdaristan. It follows a four-man fireteam from "B" Company of the 222nd Army battalion, commonly called "Bad Company," composed of troublemakers who are mainly used as cannon fodder. Private Preston Marlowe (David Menkin), newly transferred to the company, is the game's protagonist. The intelligent but nervous Private Terrence Sweetwater (Richard Lynson) serves as a foil to Private George Gordon Haggard Jr. (Nigel Whitmey), a pyromaniac and the comic relief of the story. Sergeant Samuel D. Redford (Bruce Johnson) is the team's leader, who volunteered to be transferred to Bad Company in exchange for shortening his term of service and has only three days left to serve. The campaign takes place in the fictional Caucasian country of Serdaristan, and a fictional Middle Eastern city called Sadiz near the Caspian Sea.

=== Story ===
Marlowe, a recent transferee to Bad Company, meets his new squadmates Redford, Sweetwater, and Haggard. After fighting through Russian positions and capturing the city of Zabograd, the squad encounter the infamous "Legionnaires" mercenary group under the command of the eponymous Legionnaire (Nathan Osgood). While inspecting one of the dead Legionnaires, Sweetwater mentions a rumor that the mercenaries are all paid in gold bricks, intriguing the squad. After scouting ahead, they spot more Legionnaires loading trucks with gold, which then drive past the border into neighboring Serdaristan, a neutral state. Despite Redford's orders to withdraw from the area, Haggard, excited over the prospect of gold, pursues the trucks, unintentionally invading a neutral country; the rest of the squad pursues Haggard to stop him from causing further damage.

After the squad finds Haggard, mission coordinator Mike-One-Juliet (Jennifer Woodward) tells Redford that he will be court martialed for Haggard's actions, as well as delaying his retirement. With nothing left to lose, Redford flippantly suggests that they pursue the trucks to a harbor where they find a ship they believe to contain even more gold. But before the squad can board the ship, they are forced to surrender to U.S Army forces that have caught up with them. Instead of being punished however, the Army makes them an offer: in exchange for exoneration, they are to investigate Serdaristan further and capture its dictator Zavimir Serdar (Stefan Ashton Frank) for questioning. Although their extraction helicopter is shot down, the squad proceeds to fight their way to Serdar's palace, where he tells them that the Legionnaires are also after him due to his outstanding debts to them. As they attempt to escape, Mike-One-Juliet informs them that the U.S. Army has disavowed the squad, and that they must find their own way out. The squad escapes with Serdar using his golden Mil Mi-24, with the Legionnaires in pursuit.

Serdar directs them to Serdaristan's military nexus, where they destroy an oil refinery and the country's internet service station. Afterwards, their helicopter is shot down by a Ka-52 personally operated by The Legionnaire, and they crash land in Russia. Preston wakes up alone and, with help from Mike-One-Juliet, reunites with the squad at a monastery, although Serdar has been captured. They then move to rescue Serdar, and manage to save him from being executed by the Legionnaires. Escaping in a boat, they leave Serdar on a small, isolated island and arrive in Sadiz, a city under construction somewhere in the Caspian Sea, where they spot the same ship they saw in Serdaristan. Fighting their way through enemy lines, they learn that the U.S. Army is also mounting an offensive and fear competition for the gold. They then make a deal to share some of the gold with Mike-One-Juliet in exchange for mission support.

After slowing the U.S. Army's offensive by destroying two bridges, the squad reaches a gold-filled garage but are once again attacked by the Legionnaire in his personal Ka-52. Preston manages to shoot down The Legionnaire, and the squad returns to the gold, only to find the U.S. Army loading it into supply trucks. Dejected, the squad prepare to leave, but they are spotted by an army officer; Preston and Redford convince him that they are part of the unit, and the officer orders them to take a truck of the gold and join the convoy. The squad obliges, but sneak away from the convoy with their truck while celebrating their plans to spend the gold. Meanwhile, The Legionnaire emerges from the burning wreckage of his helicopter unscathed.

== Development ==
=== Promotion ===
Three trailers were released for Bad Company, each parodying popular video game series. The first trailer parodied Metal Gear Solid 4: Guns of the Patriots called "Snake Eyes", the second parodied Gears of War and the song "Mad World" called "Bad World" and the third parodied Rainbow Six Vegas 2 called "Rainbow Sprinkles".

=== Release ===
"Find All Five" is a way for players to unlock specific weapons. The game's official website includes promotional events that give the player codes for unlockable weapons. These "Find All Five" weapons include the F2000 Belgian assault rifle, USAS-12 automatic shotgun, M60 general purpose machine gun, QBU-88 sniper rifle and silenced Uzi sub-machine gun.

The five events from EA's website instructed users to participate in the Battlefield Veteran's program, check the player's stats online after playing the game, register for the BF newsletter, pre-order the game through participating stores, and get to rank 4 in the demo.

Upon learning about this system, many players were angered as it meant that a potential in-game advantage would be given to players willing to pay extra money for pre-orders, or share their personal information when signing up for the newsletter.

On 11 September 2008, Battlefield: Bad Company's website revealed that three of the Find All Five codes would be released due to lack of availability. These three guns were the QBU-88 Sniper Rifle, M60 Light Machine Gun and the Silenced Mini Uzi Sub-Machine Gun. The USAS12 Full-Automatic Shotgun code was leaked later. The F2000 Assault Rifle is being withheld as an exclusive weapon for veterans of the series.

On 21 March 2023, it was announced that the game would be delisted from digital storefronts on 28 April, along with its sequel and Battlefield 1943. The servers were shut down on 8 December 2023.

== Reception ==
Reception

Aggregate score
| Aggregator | Score |
|---|---|
| Metacritic | PS3: 84/100; X360: 83/100 |

Review scores
| Publication | Score |
|---|---|
| 1Up.com | B |
| GameSpot | 8.5/10 |
| IGN | 8.6/10 |
| PlayStation Official Magazine – UK | 7/10 |
| GamePlanet | 9.0/10 |

Battlefield: Bad Company received positive reviews from critics. A large portion of praise went to the game's realistically destructible environments, impressive weapons, variety of gameplay and vehicles, and its "extraordinary" multiplayer gameplay. Criticism was mainly on a sluggish opening and graphics.

IGN noted several flaws in the game, but still gave the game a very positive score of 8.6.

Giant Bomb gave it a 5/5 saying, "It looks great, has fun characters, a load of interesting weaponry, and works nicely whether you're playing alone or with a squad."

Official PlayStation Magazine gave it a score of 7 saying "[p]ersonality, guns and destruction are Bad Company's strongest cards and it plays them hard" while also noting the "killjoy" A.I. opponents with a "clairvoyant ability to spot you from what seems like miles away".

GameSpot praised the game with a score of 8.5 ("Great"), noting that the game "is the most fun, addictive shooter released so far this year".

1UP criticized the game's poor AI with an average score "75" saying "With a thumping sound and sudden cloud of dust, grenades erase whole sections of houses. Bullets, however, stop dead in the thinnest wood slat. But what Bad Company needs isn't a trip to a real-life firing range – it's its inflexible A.I. that requires the lessons".

== Sequel ==
EA released a direct sequel, Battlefield: Bad Company 2, in March 2010.
