= Battlefield 1943 =

2009 video game

- Developer: DICE
- Publisher: Electronic Arts
- Designer: Sebastian Armonioso
- Series: Battlefield
- Engine: Frostbite 1.5
- Platforms: Xbox 360; PlayStation 3
- Release: Xbox 360: WW: 8 July 2009; PlayStation 3: WW: 9 July 2009
- Genre: First-person shooter
- Mode: Multiplayer

Battlefield 1943 is a 2009 first-person shooter game developed by DICE and published by Electronic Arts for Xbox 360 and PlayStation 3 through digital distribution. It is the eighth installment in the Battlefield series. It takes place in the Pacific Theater of Operations of World War II. A Microsoft Windows version was planned but later cancelled.

The game received generally favorable reviews from critics.

== Setting ==
Battlefield 1943 casts players as either being Marines with the United States Marine Corps (USMC) or the Imperial Japanese Navy (IJN) with up to 24 players on three maps: Wake Island, Guadalcanal, and Iwo Jima. After all players collectively reached 43 million kills, players received access to an additional Coral Sea map.

== Gameplay ==
An example of the Scout class fighting in Wake Island. Note the destructible environment.

Like Battlefield: Bad Company, 1943 features the Frostbite Engine for its environmental damage. The game only features the series' signature Conquest mode and a new game type called Air Superiority which was unlocked when the online gaming community reached a combined total of 43 million kills in Conquest. Similar to Battlefield Heroes, 1943 features only three classes: Infantryman, armed with an SMG and anti-tank rocket; Rifleman, armed with a semi-automatic rifle and rifle grenade; and Scout, armed with a scoped rifle, pistol, and dynamite. Each class has an unlimited supply of ammunition. Explosive ordnance, however, does take time to replenish. The game also features a regenerating health system.

There are four types of vehicles in the game; fighter, tank, car and landing craft. Each team's main base has two one-man fighter aircraft, with A6M2 Zeros for the Imperial Navy and F4U Corsairs for the United States Marine Corps. On every map there is also an airfield for either team to capture where a third plane can be used to a team's advantage. Each airplane has four machine guns and can also drop bombs. Tanks can accommodate two players, a driver who can use a tank cannon and a coaxial machine gun, and a passenger who can use a mounted machine gun. Cars can accommodate up to three players: a driver, a gunner in the back who operates a machine gun, and a passenger who can fire their own weapon. Landing craft (boats) are used to deliver troops from the carriers to the beaches. Players can also use air raid bunkers to attack with three bomber aircraft to clear an area of a map. To operate these, the player must enter a bunker with a large spinning dish on top. Planes can be shot down by fighter pilots and anti-aircraft guns, reducing the amount of bombs that the air raid can deliver, or destroying it entirely.

== Development, marketing and release ==
According to the game's development team, accessibility and value were the main reasons the game went digital as opposed to an ordinary retail launch.

At the time of the Xbox Live Arcade version's release, issues with server joining and statistic recording functionality were reported. DICE's Gordon Van Dyke and EA responded to the situation, noting that the player volume was much higher than expected and server capacity was exceeded. To remedy the issues, EA and DICE added more servers. Van Dyke also noted that there were problems with players having trouble using their EA accounts. Despite launch problems, DICE reported that after the first day of release players had accumulated 29.45 years worth of game time and over 5 million kills. In 2011, DICE announced that development of the PC version of the game was cancelled, in order to focus on Battlefield 3.

At Sony's conference at E3 2011, Sony announced that a copy of Battlefield 1943 would be included on every disc of Battlefield 3 for the PlayStation 3, but upon release it was not included. EA stated through Battlefield's Twitter account by telling a customer that "In lieu of [Battlefield 1943] being available on [disc] for [PlayStation 3] customers, EA has made all [Battlefield 3] expansions available early to [PlayStation 3] customers." Ultimately, EA decided to honor the pre-order announcement.

On 21 March 2023, it was announced that the game would be delisted from digital storefronts on 28 April, along with Battlefield: Bad Company and Battlefield: Bad Company 2. Servers for Battlefield 1943 were shut down on 8 December 2023.

== Reception ==
Reception

Aggregate score
Aggregator	Score	
Aggregator	PS3	Xbox 360
Metacritic	84/100	83/100

Review scores
Publication	Score	
Publication	PS3	Xbox 360
Destructoid	N/A	(Jordan) 8/10 (Brad) 7/10
Edge	N/A	9/10
Eurogamer	N/A	8/10
Game Informer	8.5/10	8.5/10
GamePro	4.5/5	4.5/5
GameRevolution	B+	B+
GameSpot	8/10	8/10
GameSpy	4.5/5	4.5/5
GameTrailers	N/A	7.6/10
GameZone	N/A	8/10
Giant Bomb	4/5	4/5
IGN	8.5/10	8.5/10
PlayStation Official Magazine – UK	8/10	N/A
Official Xbox Magazine (US)	N/A	7.5/10
411Mania	9.3/10	9.3/10
The A.V. Club	A−	N/A

The game received "favorable" reviews on both platforms according to the review aggregation website Metacritic. In addition to having the best sales on the first day it was released, Battlefield 1943 went on to become the fastest selling download-only game after the first week. Battlefield 1943 was the top selling Xbox Live Arcade game of 2009, as reported by Xbox Live Director of Programming Larry Hryb. It sold over 268,000 units in 2010. As of May 2010, the game sold 1.5 million copies.

== Trivia ==
"Battlefield 1943 Main Theme" by: Ian Livingstone, has a small appearance in Battlefield 6. The song has a small chance to play while the player is in the firing range.
