= Battlefield 2042 =

2021 video game

- Developer: DICE (Note: Additional work by Ripple Effect Studios, EA Gothenburg, and Criterion Games)
- Publisher: Electronic Arts
- Director: Lars Gustavsson
- Producers: Jeremy Chubb; Mattias Hansson; Craig McLeod
- Designers: Thomas Jansson; Sam Hayter; Alexander Formoso; Fawzi Mesmar; Daniel Berlin; Ross Darvill; Jesper Hylling; Manuel Llanes
- Programmers: Johan Allanson; Gustav Joelsson; Kevin Moore; Vidir Reynisson; Mikael Uddholm; Erik Westerlund
- Artists: Joseph McLamb; Jhony Ljungstedt
- Writers: Flora Barre; Alexander Freed; Michael Hartin; Justin Langley; Cathleen Rootsaert
- Composers: Hildur Guðnadóttir; Sam Slater
- Series: Battlefield
- Engine: Frostbite
- Platforms: Microsoft Windows; PlayStation 4; PlayStation 5; Xbox One; Xbox Series X/S
- Release: November 19, 2021 (Note: The Gold and Ultimate Edition of the game were released on November 12, 2021, while the Standard edition was released on November 19.)
- Genre: First-person shooter
- Mode: Multiplayer

Battlefield 2042 is a 2021 online-only multiplayer first-person shooter game developed by DICE and published by Electronic Arts. The seventeenth installment in the Battlefield series, it was released on November 19, 2021, for Microsoft Windows, PlayStation 4, PlayStation 5, Xbox One, and Xbox Series X/S. Unlike previous games in the series, Battlefield 2042 is solely multiplayer and does not have a single-player campaign. It is also the first installment to feature support for cross-platform play. It was the final Battlefield game to be released for the PlayStation 4 and Xbox One platforms.

The game received mixed reviews from critics and a negative reception from players for its technical issues, lack of features, and certain changes to the gameplay. The game failed to meet the sales expectations of Electronic Arts. A new Battlefield installment, titled Battlefield 6, developed by Battlefield Studios (DICE, Motive Studios, Ripple Effect Studios and Criterion Games), was released on October 10, 2025.

== Gameplay ==
As with its predecessor, Battlefield 2042 is a team-based first-person shooter in which players compete against each other in large maps that can accommodate up to 128 players.

Similar to its predecessors, Battlefield 2042 is a multiplayer-focused first-person shooter. As the game is set in the near future, it features futuristic weapons and gadgets like deployable turrets and drones, as well as vehicles that players can control. Players can request a vehicle air-drop to any location. The game introduced a "Plus" system which allows players to customize their weapons on the spot. The class system is significantly overhauled and removes the four defined classes from previous games; instead, players can assume control of a specialist who falls under the four traditional Battlefield gameplay classes of Assault, Engineer, Medic, and Recon. These characters can wield any of the weapons and gadgets that a player has unlocked. Each operator has their own unique skills and gadgets. For instance, one of the specialists, Emma "Sundance" Rosier, is equipped with a wingsuit, while another, Maria Falck, is equipped with a healing pistol. There are extreme weather effects such as tornadoes and sandstorms which may affect gameplay. The game featured seven maps at launch, including 'Breakaway', the largest map in the history of the Battlefield franchise.

The game has three main gameplay modes. "All-Out Warfare" encompasses "Breakthrough" and "Conquest", two staple modes of the series. In Conquest, two teams combat against each other to capture control points; once all control points in a sector are captured, the team controls said sector. In Breakthrough, one team must try to capture another team's control points, while another team must defend them. Both modes can be played with and against AI-controlled players. The PlayStation 5, Windows, and Xbox Series X/S versions support matches with up to 128 players, whereas the PlayStation 4 and Xbox One versions support up to 64 players. For the first time in the series, Battlefield 2042 features support for cross-platform play with the PlayStation 5, Windows, and Xbox Series X/S versions. While the PlayStation 4 and Xbox One versions also support the feature, it is restricted to only players on the two aforementioned platforms.

The second main mode included in the game is a community-driven platform called "Battlefield Portal". Portal allows players to create customized multiplayer modes and features select maps from past Battlefield games such as Battlefield 1942, Battlefield: Bad Company 2, and Battlefield 3. In addition, players can modify core gameplay elements such as health, weapon loadouts, and movement through a web-based scripting application.

The third mode is a cooperative multiplayer mode called "Hazard Zone". In this mode, players are divided into teams, and they must compete with each other to retrieve and extract data drives from the debris of fallen satellites. These data drives are guarded by enemy combatants controlled by AI-controlled players. Players earn "dark market credits" after successfully extracting a data drive. These credits can be spent on purchasing new weapons and upgrades in this mode.

== Synopsis ==
=== Setting and characters ===
Battlefield 2042 takes place 22 years after the events of Battlefield 4. Unlike previous installments, it does not have a single-player campaign. Instead, the story is told through multiplayer gameplay. Decades of devastation caused by collapsing economies, rising sea levels and broken alliances (including the collapse of the European Union due to Germany's bankruptcy and subsequent refugees known as "No-Pats") come to a peak in 2040 when a Kessler syndrome event occurs, causing 70% of orbiting satellites to crash to Earth. The resulting permanent global blackout causes tensions between the United States and Russia to skyrocket, with war breaking out by the year 2042.

Outside of multiplayer gameplay, the story is also told on Electronic Arts' official website for Battlefield 2042. A standalone short film titled Exodus, which depicts events leading up to the War of 2042 and features returning Battlefield 4 character Irish, premiered on August 12, 2021, via Battlefield's YouTube channel.

The 10 specialists announced were:

- Webster Mackay, a former Canadian soldier who is agile on his feet and uses a grappling hook to traverse the landscape.
- Maria Falck, a German medic who has a pistol that shoots healing darts and can revive teammates to full health.
- Wikus "Casper" Van Daele, a South African ghillie suit-wearing sniper.
- Pyotr "Boris" Guskovsky, a Russian combat engineer who can place sentry guns.
- Kimble "Irish" Graves, a former United States Marine (and recurring character from Battlefield 4) who can defend his teammates with a deployable bulletproof shield or an APS.
- Navin Rao, a skilled Indian hacker who can bring down enemy networks.
- Santiago "Dozer" Espinoza, a tough Mexican soldier who can tank damage.
- Emma "Sundance" Rosier, a French aerial specialist skilled with explosives who uses their (Note: Rosier is confirmed to be non-binary and uses they/them pronouns.) wingsuit to fly around.
- Ji-Soo Paik, a South Korean whose abilities allow her to spot enemies with ease.
- Constantin "Angel" Anghel, a Romanian who can revive his teammates with full ammunition quickly and call in loadout drops.

New specialists were added every season from season 1 onwards, with season 4 introducing the last specialist to the game. Specialists introduced in post-launch patches include:

- Ewelina Lis, a Polish special force soldier who is equipped with a rocket launcher that shoots remote-controlled projectiles. She can also highlight the damaged enemy vehicles on the player's screen with a red overlay. (Season 1: Zero Hour)
- Charlie Crawford, a former British MI6 agent who also moonlighted as an arms dealer for the Dark Market organization. He can deploy a stationary minigun, as well as refill his squadmates' gadget ammunition when reviving them. (Season 2: Master of Arms)
- Rasheed Zain, an Egyptian security expert who can use an airburst launcher to flush out enemies behind cover while recovering health after defeating an enemy. (Season 3: Escalation)
- Camila Blasco, a Spanish reconnaissance agent who specializes in ambush and infiltration with a device that can scramble enemy systems. (Season 4: Eleventh Hour)

== Development ==
The game is developed by series developer DICE in Sweden, with Ripple Effect Studios, EA Gothenburg, and Criterion Games assisting development. It has the largest development team for a Battlefield game, and Criterion had to put the production of the next Need for Speed game on hold in order to assist DICE. Unlike previous installments in the series, the game does not have a traditional single-player campaign. This allowed DICE to allocate more resources to develop the multiplayer portion, which was considered to be the studio's area of expertise. Instead, the story is told through the specialists, which are named and fully-voiced characters who have their own stories and perspective. The narrative was described as "evolving" as new operators and locations would be added to the game post-release. While the narrative of the game depicts a world ravaged by climate apocalypse, DICE added that the game was not a commentary on climate change and the team only chose this setting for "gameplay reasons".

As each match can now accommodate more players, the team had significantly expanded the size of the maps. However, instead of simply creating huge maps, the locations in the game were designed based on the idea of "clustering" in order to funnel players towards a particular direction where they can engage with other players. Daniel Berlin, the design director of the game, described the maps as "several smaller maps stitched together". The decision to include artificial intelligence for the All-out Warfare mode was made early during the game's development as the team believed that it would be a good entry point for beginners. Ripple Effect, formerly DICE Los Angeles, led the development of Battlefield Portal. The game runs on the latest iteration of the Frostbite engine.

A short work-in-progress demonstration of the game was shown at the 2020 EA Play Live event, teasing large scale battles and detailed facial animations. The game was announced on June 9, 2021. An open beta took place from October 6 to 9, 2021, ahead of the game's launch on November 19, 2021, for PlayStation 4, PlayStation 5, Windows, Xbox One, and Xbox Series X/S. The launch was delayed from its original October 22 release date due to impacts from the ongoing COVID-19 pandemic.

== Marketing ==
The game's first trailer was released on June 9, 2021; it featured a remix of Mötley Crüe's "Kickstart My Heart" by 2WEI. The trailer was noted for including in its climatic moment a "rendezook" - a classic Battlefield trick shot whereupon during a dogfight, a player ejects from their jet, shoots down their pursuer using a rocket launcher while airborne, and then re-enters their jet.

== Post-launch content ==
EA supported the game extensively with downloadable content after launch; Battlefield 2042 utilizes the battle pass model. Gameplay content would be free for all players, whereas players who purchased the battle pass would receive additional cosmetic items. Before the release of Season 1, DICE released several updates for the game; Update 4.1 removed the 128-player Breakthrough mode, which was deemed to be too chaotic.

As of March 2024, DICE had released a total of seven seasons. The last Specialist was added in Season 4, and DICE announced on April 9, 2024, that Season 7 would be the last official season, but it will continue to maintain the game. Numerous different limited-time modes were made available during the game's update cycle, most notably a limited-time crossover based on Dead Space. Following the conclusion of seasonal updates, the game began to offer previous battle pass items in the in-game store and transitioned to a "best of" playlist system, offering numerous different variants of the game's multiplayer modes. Leading up to the release of Battlefield 6, the game received a final update that added Iwo Jima, a returning map from previous Battlefield titles, new weapons, a battle pass, and numerous changes to equipment. Progression through the battle pass rewards players with items that can be used in Battlefield 6.

Seasons of Battlefield 2042
Season number	Season name	Release date	Description
Year 1
1	Zero Hour	June 9, 2022	The update introduced new weapons and vehicles, a new map named "Exposure", set in the Canadian Rockies, and a new, Polish specialist named Ewelina Lis, who is equipped with a rocket launcher that can shoot player-guided projectiles. A 12-week battle pass was also included in season 1. DICE also decided to shift development resources away from the Hazard Zone mode. While the mode will remain playable, no further content would be developed for it.
2	Master of Arms	August 30, 2022	The content update introduced a new map called "Stranded", set in the Panama Canal, with its centerpiece being a shipwrecked tanker, new weapons, gadget and vehicles, and a new British specialist named Charlie Crawford, who is equipped with a Mounted Vulcan stationary minigun. The update also introduce weapons that were previously exclusive to the "Portal" mode to the main "All-Out Warfare" mode under the name "Vault Weapons", with the first two being the M16A3 assault rifle and the M60E4 light machine gun, originally from Battlefield 3.
3	Escalation	November 22, 2022	A new map set in Sweden titled "Spearhead" was introduced, with its centerpiece being two megafactories. Alongside the new map, new weapons, gadgets and vehicles, along with a new Egyptian specialist named Rasheed Zain, were introduced. After the initial rollout of the update, which also saw the game be added to the EA Play subscription service, more changes are planned to roll out during the season, including a rework to the specialist system - which marks the return of the class system of past Battlefield titles - and reworks to the "Manifest" and "Breakaway" maps. These map reworks were released as part of Update 3.1. In addition to these changes, future updates as part of Season 3 introduced more legacy "vault" weapons from both Battlefield: Bad Company 2 and Battlefield 3, with Update 3.2 in particular introducing the aforementioned reintroduction of the class system.
4	Eleventh Hour	February 28, 2023	This season added a new Spanish "recon" specialist named Camila Blasco. She is the last Specialist to be added to the game. New weapons and gadgetry, the new map "Flashpoint", set in the deserts of northern South Africa, and a new vehicle were also added. Throughout this season, more weapons from Battlefield 3 returned.
Year 2
5	New Dawn	June 7, 2023	A new map set in the Czech Republic, "Reclaimed", depicting an abandoned factory was added. This map first appeared as "Zavod 311" in Battlefield 4. Three new weapons, the XCE Bar, GEW-46, and BFP.50 were added, alongside new grenade types. A new squad management system, akin to previous titles, was added. A rework of the map "Hourglass" was introduced. "New Dawn" marks the start of Year 2 of Battlefield 2042, with a new "Elite Edition" being introduced in lieu of the "Ultimate Edition".
6	Dark Creations	October 10, 2023	"Redacted", set at the Scottish Hebrides and inspired by fan-favorite close quarters maps from previous titles, was introduced. Three new weapons, the G428, L9CZ and VHX D3, new portable pouches for ammo and health, and a new vehicle named the YUV-2 “Pondhawk” were introduced.
7	Turning Point	March 19, 2024	"Turning Point" was the game's final season. It featured two maps rather than one: "Haven", set in Chile, and "Stadium", a returning location from "Hourglass" set in Doha, Qatar, that was previously removed in the rework of "New Dawn". Three new weapons were introduced, the AK 5C, SCZ-3 & DFR Strife LMG. The Predator SRAW, last seen in Battlefield 4, also made a return. The XFAD-4 Draugr stealth bomber was the final new vehicle.
Post-Season
8	Circle of Hell	October 29, 2024	New night variants of "Battle of the Bulge" and "El Alamein" have been released. While the event does not feature any new weapons or vehicles, it does include cosmetic skins in the new "Event Pass". The M1 Garand has also been added as a vault weapon in Tier 15, alongside the UH-60, BMP-2, and M3A3 Bradley, which are classified as "Vault Drops" that were introduced before and after the event.
9	War Machine	March 18, 2025	Much like the "Circle of Hell", the "War Machine" event does not feature any new weapons or vehicles, aside from cosmetic items. The AN-94 vault weapon was made available at Tier 15.
10	Road to Battlefield 6	August 18, 2025	"Road to Battlefield 6" unveils a new map, "Iwo Jima", a returning location from past games. New weapons, including the KFS2000 and Lynx, has been introduced. Additionally, two more vault drops, the A-10 Warthog and Su-25TM Frogfoot, are part of the game. This event also includes exclusive rewards that can be redeemed in Battlefield 6 until March 31, 2026.

== Reception ==
Reception

Aggregate scores
Aggregator	Score
Metacritic	(PC) 68/100 (PS5) 63/100 (XSXS) 61/100
OpenCritic	33% recommend

Review scores
Publication	Score
Destructoid	6/10
Electronic Gaming Monthly	5/5
GameSpot	7/10
GamesRadar+	3.5/5
Hardcore Gamer	3/5
IGN	7/10
Jeuxvideo.com	18/20
PCGamesN	7/10
PCMag	3/5
Push Square	6/10
Shacknews	5/10
The Guardian	2/5
VG247	3/5

=== Critical response ===
Battlefield 2042 received "mixed or average reviews" on all platforms, according to the review aggregator website Metacritic, making it the lowest-rated installment in the Battlefield series. Fellow review aggregator OpenCritic assessed that the game received weak approval, being recommended by 33% of critics.

Electronic Gaming Monthly gave the game five out of five stars, writing: "Battlefield 2042 brings the sandbox back to the series in bold and controversial ways. The new Specialist system might seem like sacrilege at first, but it opens up gameplay opportunities that weren't possible in previous titles. The massive, well-designed maps offer plenty of room for experimentation and emergent stories, and the modes are a blast." Hardcore Gamer summarized its 3/5 review by saying: "Battlefield 2042 should have been a triumphant return of the franchise and developer. In some respects, Battlefield 2042 delivers on its promises thanks to fantastic gameplay, a suite of new features and improvements, and a presentation that looks as good as it plays. Unfortunately, the game falls short just as much, if not more."

Jordan Devore of Destructoid wrote, "Battlefield 2042 feels like it could become a cool game, but it's tantalizingly out of reach today. There's enough promise with the satisfying-when-it-works gunplay, large-scale chaos [...] It didn't have to be this way though." GamesRadar+ praised Battlefield 2042's All-Out War, the visuals, and the Portal mode, but criticized the Hazard Zone mode and the removal of classes. IGN thought similarly, concluding, "For a game claiming to be the future of Battlefield, 2042's impressive Portal options make it clear that it doesn't stack up to the past. Instead, it's those same customization tools that could come to define it in time." GameSpot felt the game had a lot of variety but that many of the glitches hampered the experience, especially on PC. Christian Vaz of PCGamesN gave the game a 7/10 and criticized it for feeling rushed, stating, "This near-future sequel has all the components it needs to become a classic entry in the multiplayer series, but it feels like 2042 is many updates away from reaching its full potential."

Phil Iwaniuk writing for The Guardian gave the game two out of five stars, feeling that 128-player matches were too chaotic and granted little accomplishment for individuals, while noting criticism of the game's numerous bugs and netcode issues. VG247's Sherif Saed also criticized the game's bugs and poor technical state, adding that many of the same bugs had been present in recent Battlefield games. Chris Jarrard of Shacknews described the game's Specialist system as "befuddling" and described maps as "uninspiring" and "painful to traverse" on foot, further criticizing technical issues. Writing for Push Square, Liam Croft compared the game to a starter meal, stating that what the game offered at launch was too little for the asking price.

=== Audience response and changes ===
Player reception was much more critical. Battlefield 2042 became one of the worst-reviewed games on Steam, garnering almost 30,000 negative reviews by November 21, 2021. Players criticized extensive bugs, a lack of features previously included in older Battlefield games, and several changes to gameplay. Some also panned the inclusion of Christmas-themed skins, including a leaked Santa Claus example, as conflicting with the series' "dark and gritty" tone. Despite becoming one of its most played games on Steam at launch, the game's player count sharply declined in the following weeks from about 105,400 concurrent peak players to an average peak of 52,000. On November 28, 2021, Kotaku journalist Zack Zwiezen noted that Battlefield 2042 had been overtaken in player numbers on Steam by Farming Simulator 22, considering it notable that "one of the biggest games of the year on one of the most popular digital stores in the world on one of the biggest gaming platforms in the world [...] isn't able to keep up with Farming Simulator 22". By 2 December, Battlefield 2042 had lost 70% of its initial players on Steam. By the end of December, the Steam concurrent player base for Battlefield 2042 decreased to about 19,000, being overtaken by 2018's Battlefield V in daily player numbers. By mid-April 2022, the game's player count had declined even further, dropping below 1,000 at certain points. Following the release of update 4.00, the Steam player count increased to an average of over 2,000 players.

In January 2022, DICE removed the popular "Rush" mode from the featured playlist in Battlefield 2042's Portal mode, resulting in more backlash from players. Meanwhile, EA global communications director Andy McNamara criticized the audience's expectations as "brutal" on Twitter, causing hostile responses from players and harassment of DICE developers. On Reddit, discourse about Battlefield 2042 became adversarial enough that moderators threatened to shut down the game's official subreddit. In response to the outcry, "Rush" was restored to the game later the same month. In February 2022, a Change.org petition advocating for all buyers of Battlefield 2042 to be refunded reached more than 200,000 signatures within a month. The author of the petition cited the game's numerous technical issues that had rendered it "unplayable", while claiming that the developers failed to keep promises with improving the game at launch.

In response to fan feedback, DICE released an update for the game in April 2022, version 4.00, which brought over 400 changes, including bug fixes, improvements to gameplay balancing, and other additions. In May, DICE announced Battlefield 2042's Season 1 and released a video explaining their commitment to improving the game through changes to maps, modes, and Specialists, new items, a focus on smaller player-counts, and improving the controls and animations of player characters; DICE also announced they would no longer be supporting the game's Hazard Zone mode. In June, EA denied reports from Giant Bomb's Jeff Grubb that the development team was "down to a skeleton crew", saying, "There is a significant team across studios focused on evolving and improving the Battlefield 2042 experience for our players, and at the heart of that is our team at DICE." In September, Vince Zampella, head of Respawn Entertainment and the Battlefield series, stated that the game had "strayed a little too far from what Battlefield is".

=== Sales ===
Battlefield 2042 was the third best-selling retail game in the UK on its week of release, only behind Pokémon Brilliant Diamond and Shining Pearl. It was the second best-selling game in November 2021 in the US, according to NPD Group. It went on to become the fifth best-selling game in 2021 in the US.

During an earnings call in February 2022, EA revealed that the game had failed to meet sales expectations. EA blamed the game's performance on remote work during the COVID-19 pandemic, leading to unexpected technical issues during the launch period of the game, and remarked that some of the design choices made by the team "did not resonate" with the Battlefield community.

=== Accolades ===
Year	Award	Category	Nominee(s)	Result	Ref.
2022	25th Annual D.I.C.E. Awards	Outstanding Technical Achievement	Daniel Berlin, Mikael Uddholm	Nominated	
2022	Visual Effects Society Awards	Outstanding Visual Effects in a Real-Time Project	Anders Egleus, Jeremy Chubb, Gray Horsfield, Sean Ellis	Nominated	
2022	Society of Composers & Lyricists Award	Outstanding Original Score for Interactive Media	Hildur Guðnadóttir & Sam Slater	Won	

== See also ==
- List of video games notable for negative reception
