= Battlefield Vietnam =

2004 video game

- Developer: Digital Illusions Canada
- Publisher: Electronic Arts (Note: Released under EA Games imprint)
- Designer: Armando Marini
- Artist: Riccard Linde
- Series: Battlefield
- Platform: Microsoft Windows
- Release: NA: 15 March 2004; EU: 19 March 2004; Redux: NA: 15 March 2005
- Genre: First-person shooter
- Modes: Single-player, multiplayer

Battlefield Vietnam is a 2004 first-person shooter game developed by Digital Illusions Canada and published by Electronic Arts for Microsoft Windows. It is the second installment of the Battlefield series, coming after Battlefield 1942. Battlefield Vietnam takes place during the Vietnam War and features a large variety of maps based on historical settings, such as the Ho Chi Minh Trail, Battle of Huế, Ia Drang Valley, Operation Flaming Dart, the Battle of Khe Sanh and Fall of Saigon. On 15 March 2005, EA re-released the game as Battlefield Vietnam: Redux, which includes new vehicles, maps and an EA-produced World War II mod, based on the previous installment Battlefield 1942.

== Gameplay ==
In the game's playable maps, the player's primary objective is to occupy Control Points to enable allies and controllable vehicles to spawn. Battlefield Vietnam employs similar point-by-point objectives to Battlefield 1942 as well as a form of asymmetrical warfare gameplay. The two teams, the U.S. and North Vietnam, are provided different equipment and vehicles. The U.S. relies on heavy vehicles, employing heavy tanks, helicopters, and bombers. The Vietnamese rely on infantry tactics, utilizing anti-tank weapons. The developers intended to reflect the actual conditions of war throughout the game. The game features a "Sipi Hole" as a mobile spawn point, which is representative of the vast tunnel networks utilized by Vietnam forces. Similar to previous games in the Battlefield series, spawn tickets (reinforcements) play a vital role in defeating the opposing team.

Battlefield Vietnam features the United States with Marines, Army and the Navy; South Vietnam with Army of the Republic of Vietnam; and North Vietnam with People's Army of Vietnam and the Viet Cong.

Built on a modified version of the Battlefield 1942 engine, Battlefield Vietnam has new and improved features compared to its predecessor. The game gives the player a variety of weapons based on the war and features various contemporary weapons and concepts, such as the AK47 assault rifle and punji stick traps. The game introduced several vehicle improvements over its predecessor, such as air-lifting vehicles and working vehicle radios. The radios feature 1960s music and an option for the player to import their own audio files into a designated directory. Unlike in Battlefield 1942, players are able to fire their weapons from vehicles when in the passenger seat of a vehicle. The game is the first in the Battlefield series to utilize a 3D map, allowing players to see icons that represent the position of control points or friendly units, giving the player increased situational awareness.

== Reception ==
Reception

Aggregate score
Aggregator	Score
Metacritic	84/100

Review scores
Publication	Score
Computer Gaming World	4/5
Edge	8/10
Game Informer	8/10
GamePro	5/5
GameRevolution	B+
GameSpot	8.5/10
GameSpy	4/5
GameZone	9/10 (Redux) 6.5/10
IGN	8.2/10
PC Gamer (US)	90%
Maxim	8/10
Playboy	88%

In June 2004, Battlefield Vietnam received a "Gold" certification from the Verband der Unterhaltungssoftware Deutschland, indicating sales of at least 100,000 units across Germany, Switzerland and Austria. Overall sales of Battlefield Vietnam reached 990,000 copies by that November, by which time the Battlefield series had sold 4.4 million copies.

The game received "generally favorable reviews" according to the review aggregation website Metacritic.

Battlefield Vietnam was a runner-up for Computer Games Magazine's list of the 10 best computer games of 2004. It won the magazine's special award for "Best Soundtrack". It also won GameSpot's 2004 "Best Licensed Music" award.
