= Battlefield (video game series) =

First-person shooter video game franchise by EA DICE

- Genre: First-person shooter
- Developers: Battlefield Studios: DICE; Criterion Games (2025–); Ripple Effect Studios (2025–); Motive Studio (2025–); Other: Easy Studios (2009, 2011); Neowiz Games (2010); Visceral Games (2015)
- Publisher: Electronic Arts
- Creator: Johan Persson
- Platforms: Microsoft Windows, macOS, PlayStation 2, Xbox, PlayStation 3, Xbox 360, PlayStation 4, Xbox One, PlayStation 5, Xbox Series X/S, Android, iOS, Kindle Fire
- First release: Battlefield 1942; September 10, 2002
- Latest release: Battlefield 6 October 10, 2025

Battlefield is a military first-person shooter video game franchise developed by Battlefield Studios, primarily led by Swedish company DICE, and published by American company Electronic Arts. The series mainly focuses on online multiplayer, with gameplay taking place across large maps, and emphasizes teamwork and combined arms warfare.

The first installment of the franchise, Battlefield 1942, was released for Microsoft Windows and OS X computers in 2002. Since then, the series' installments have sold 88.7 million copies worldwide as of November 2022.

== Gameplay ==
The Battlefield games usually focus on large-scale, online multiplayer battles between two conflicting military forces; in Battlefield Hardline, the military setting is replaced with a "war on crime" between the police Special Response Units and the criminals. Playing in squads has become a major element of games in the series. Apart from infantry, tanks, airplanes, and other vehicles may participate in these battles. Since Battlefield 2, the series centrally recorded online stats for each player, allowing users to receive rank promotions and weapon unlocks based on their performance as well as awards such as medals, ribbons, and pins. While continuing to focus on large, online multiplayer battles, 2008's Battlefield: Bad Company introduced full single-player campaigns with more fleshed-out storylines. (Note: A single-player mode was first featured in Battlefield 2: Modern Combat) It was also the first game to use the studio-developed game engine, Frostbite, which introduced almost fully destructible environments; a feature that has since become one of the most well-known staples of the series.

The series' flagship game mode is "Conquest", where two teams of players attempt to gain control of the most control points until the other team's tickets (respawns) run out. To capture a control point, players must stand within the capture area until their team captures it. Should a control point be captured already by the enemy team, or should any enemy players contest it, players must eliminate all enemy players and/or neutralize the control point first by standing within the capture area. Captured control points may act as respawn points for players, though they can also respawn on squad members who are not in combat and specialized equipment carried by certain classes. Vehicles cannot spawn at a command post and must be obtained from the team's "headquarters", which act as the team's main spawn point. Battlefield V introduces the battle royale game mode to the Battlefield series, which merges the franchise's "core pillars of destruction, team play, and vehicles" with common elements seen in traditional battle royales. Battle royale did not return in Battlefield 2042 in favor of "Hazard Zone", a cooperative multiplayer extraction game mode. Battle royale, now titled "RedSec", returns in Battlefield 6, along with a new knockout elimination mode titled "Gauntlet" where eight squads of four players seek to complete four sets of objectives while trying not to fall into the bottom two teams. Gauntlet was replaced in Season Five with Rapid Royale, a faster version of battle royale.

Outside of early versions of Battlefield 2042, (Note: The class system was reintroduced into Battlefield 2042 in a post-launch update.) the Battlefield series features a class system. Different classes are suited to different roles in combat. Historically, the series featured the Anti-tank, Demolition, Medic, Specialist, and Special Forces classes, before these were merged into other classes in later games. The classes as seen in modern titles was first introduced in Battlefield: Bad Company 2: the Assault, who specializes in all-round combat, Engineer, who carries out in-field repairs to vehicles while being equipped with anti-vehicular weapons, Medic (later Support), who resupplies and revives fallen allies, and Recon, who specializes in spotting enemies and using sniper rifles to engage in long-distance combat. The ability to engage other players in melee combat with a knife has been present in Battlefield games, but since Battlefield 2142, the series has included an award of dog tags for each player killed using a knife.

== Games ==
Release timeline Battlefield series for main installments, italic text for DLCs
2002	Battlefield 1942
2003	Battlefield 1942: The Road to Rome
2003	Battlefield 1942: Secret Weapons of WWII
2004	Battlefield Vietnam
2005	Battlefield 2
2005	Battlefield 2: Modern Combat
2005	Battlefield 2: Special Forces
2006	Battlefield 2: Euro Force
2006	Battlefield 2: Armored Fury
2007	Battlefield 2142
2007	Battlefield 2142: Northern Strike
2008	Battlefield: Bad Company
2009	Battlefield Heroes
2010	Battlefield 1943
2010	Battlefield: Bad Company 2
2010	Battlefield: Bad Company 2: Vietnam
2011	Battlefield Online
2011	Battlefield Play4Free
2011	Battlefield 3
2012	Battlefield 3: Back to Karkand
2012	Battlefield 3: Close Quarters
2012	Battlefield 3: Armored Kill
2012	Battlefield 3: Aftermath
2012	Battlefield 3: End Game
2013	Battlefield 4
2013	Battlefield 4: China Rising
2013	Battlefield 4: Second Assault
2014	Battlefield 4: Naval Strike
2014	Battlefield 4: Dragon's Teeth
2014	Battlefield 4: Final Stand
2014	Battlefield 4: Weapons Crate
2014	Battlefield 4: Night Operations
2014	Battlefield 4: Community Operations
2014	Battlefield 4: Legacy Operations
2015	Battlefield Hardline
2015	Battlefield Hardline: Criminal Activity
2015	Battlefield Hardline: Robbery
2015	Battlefield Hardline: Blackout
2016	Battlefield Hardline: Getaway
2016	Battlefield Hardline: Betrayal
2016	Battlefield 1
2017	Battlefield 1: They Shall Not Pass
2017	Battlefield 1: In the Name of the Tsar
2017	Battlefield 1: Turning Tides
2017	Battlefield 1: Apocalypse
2018	Battlefield V
2018	Battlefield V: Overture
2018	Battlefield V: Lightning Strikes
2018	Battlefield V: Trial by Fire
2019	Battlefield V: Defying the Odds
2019	Battlefield V: War in the Pacific
2020	Battlefield V: Into the Jungle
2020	Battlefield V: Summer Update
2021	Battlefield 2042
2022	Battlefield 2042: Zero Hour
2022	Battlefield 2042: Master of Arms
2022	Battlefield 2042: Escalation
2023	Battlefield 2042: Eleventh Hour
2023	Battlefield 2042: New Dawn
2023	Battlefield 2042: Dark Creations
2024	Battlefield 2042: Turning Point
2024	Battlefield 2042: Circle of Hell
2025	Battlefield 2042: War Machine
2025	Battlefield 2042: Road to Battlefield 6
2025	Battlefield 6
2025	Battlefield 6: Season 1
2026	Battlefield 6: Season 2
2026	Battlefield 6: Season 3
2026	Battlefield 6: Season 4
2026	Battlefield 6: Season 5

Titles in the Battlefield series
Year	Title	Platform(s)	Engine
2002	Battlefield 1942	Windows, Mac OS X	Refractor 1
2003	■ Battlefield 1942: The Road to Rome	Windows, Mac OS X	Refractor 1
2003	■ Battlefield 1942: Secret Weapons of WWII	Windows, Mac OS X	Refractor 1
2004	Battlefield Vietnam	Windows	Refractor 1
2005	Battlefield 2	Windows	Refractor 2
2005	Battlefield 2: Modern Combat	PlayStation 2, Xbox, Xbox 360	RenderWare
2005	■ Battlefield 2: Special Forces	Windows	Refractor 2
2006	■ Battlefield 2: Euro Force	Windows	Refractor 2
2006	■ Battlefield 2: Armored Fury	Windows	Refractor 2
2006	Battlefield 2142	Windows, Mac OS X	Refractor 2
2007	■ Battlefield 2142: Northern Strike	Windows, Mac OS X	Refractor 2
2008	Battlefield: Bad Company	PlayStation 3, Xbox 360	Frostbite 1.0
2009	Battlefield Heroes	Windows	Refractor 2
2009	Battlefield 1943	PlayStation 3, Xbox 360	Frostbite 1.5
2010	Battlefield: Bad Company 2	Windows, PlayStation 3, Xbox 360, Android, iOS	Frostbite 1.5
2010	■ Battlefield: Bad Company 2: Vietnam	Windows, PlayStation 3, Xbox 360	Frostbite 1.5
2010	Battlefield Online	Windows	Refractor 2
2011	Battlefield Play4Free	Windows	Refractor 2
2011	Battlefield 3	Windows, PlayStation 3, Xbox 360	Frostbite 2
2011	■ Battlefield 3: Back to Karkand	Windows, PlayStation 3, Xbox 360	Frostbite 2
2012	■ Battlefield 3: Close Quarters	Windows, PlayStation 3, Xbox 360	Frostbite 2
2012	■ Battlefield 3: Armored Kill	Windows, PlayStation 3, Xbox 360	Frostbite 2
2012	■ Battlefield 3: Aftermath	Windows, PlayStation 3, Xbox 360	Frostbite 2
2013	■ Battlefield 3: End Game	Windows, PlayStation 3, Xbox 360	Frostbite 2
2013	Battlefield 4	Windows, PlayStation 3, Xbox 360, PlayStation 4, Xbox One	Frostbite 3
2013	■ Battlefield 4: China Rising	Windows, PlayStation 3, Xbox 360, PlayStation 4, Xbox One	Frostbite 3
2013/2014†	■ Battlefield 4: Second Assault	Windows, PlayStation 3, Xbox 360, PlayStation 4, Xbox One	Frostbite 3
2014	■ Battlefield 4: Naval Strike	Windows, PlayStation 3, Xbox 360, PlayStation 4, Xbox One	Frostbite 3
2014	■ Battlefield 4: Dragon's Teeth	Windows, PlayStation 3, Xbox 360, PlayStation 4, Xbox One	Frostbite 3
2014	■ Battlefield 4: Final Stand	Windows, PlayStation 3, Xbox 360, PlayStation 4, Xbox One	Frostbite 3
2015	■ Battlefield 4: Weapons Crate	Windows, PlayStation 3, Xbox 360, PlayStation 4, Xbox One	Frostbite 3
2015	■ Battlefield 4: Night Operations	Windows, PlayStation 3, Xbox 360, PlayStation 4, Xbox One	Frostbite 3
2015	■ Battlefield 4: Community Operations	Windows, PlayStation 3, Xbox 360, PlayStation 4, Xbox One	Frostbite 3
2015	■ Battlefield 4: Legacy Operations	Windows, PlayStation 4, Xbox One	Frostbite 3
2015	Battlefield Hardline	Windows, PlayStation 3, Xbox 360, PlayStation 4, Xbox One	Frostbite 3
2015	■ Battlefield Hardline: Criminal Activity	Windows, PlayStation 3, Xbox 360, PlayStation 4, Xbox One	Frostbite 3
2015	■ Battlefield Hardline: Robbery	Windows, PlayStation 3, Xbox 360, PlayStation 4, Xbox One	Frostbite 3
2015	■ Battlefield Hardline: Blackout	Windows, PlayStation 3, Xbox 360, PlayStation 4, Xbox One	Frostbite 3
2016	■ Battlefield Hardline: Getaway	Windows, PlayStation 3, Xbox 360, PlayStation 4, Xbox One	Frostbite 3
2016	■ Battlefield Hardline: Betrayal	Windows, PlayStation 3, Xbox 360, PlayStation 4, Xbox One	Frostbite 3
2016	Battlefield 1	Windows, PlayStation 4, Xbox One	Frostbite 3
2017	■ Battlefield 1: They Shall Not Pass	Windows, PlayStation 4, Xbox One	Frostbite 3
2017	■ Battlefield 1: In the Name of the Tsar	Windows, PlayStation 4, Xbox One	Frostbite 3
2017	■ Battlefield 1: Turning Tides	Windows, PlayStation 4, Xbox One	Frostbite 3
2018	■ Battlefield 1: Apocalypse	Windows, PlayStation 4, Xbox One	Frostbite 3
2018	Battlefield V	Windows, PlayStation 4, Xbox One	Frostbite 3
2018	■ Battlefield V: Overture	Windows, PlayStation 4, Xbox One	Frostbite 3
2018	■ Battlefield V: Lightning Strikes	Windows, PlayStation 4, Xbox One	Frostbite 3
2019	■ Battlefield V: Trial by Fire	Windows, PlayStation 4, Xbox One	Frostbite 3
2019	■ Battlefield V: Defying the Odds	Windows, PlayStation 4, Xbox One	Frostbite 3
2019	■ Battlefield V: War in the Pacific	Windows, PlayStation 4, Xbox One	Frostbite 3
2020	■ Battlefield V: Into the Jungle	Windows, PlayStation 4, Xbox One	Frostbite 3
2020	■ Battlefield V: Summer Update	Windows, PlayStation 4, Xbox One	Frostbite 3
2021	Battlefield 2042	Windows, PlayStation 4, Xbox One, PlayStation 5, Xbox Series X/S	Frostbite
2022	■ Battlefield 2042: Zero Hour	Windows, PlayStation 4, Xbox One, PlayStation 5, Xbox Series X/S	Frostbite
2022	■ Battlefield 2042: Master of Arms	Windows, PlayStation 4, Xbox One, PlayStation 5, Xbox Series X/S	Frostbite
2022	■ Battlefield 2042: Escalation	Windows, PlayStation 4, Xbox One, PlayStation 5, Xbox Series X/S	Frostbite
2023	■ Battlefield 2042: Eleventh Hour	Windows, PlayStation 4, Xbox One, PlayStation 5, Xbox Series X/S	Frostbite
2023	■ Battlefield 2042: New Dawn	Windows, PlayStation 4, Xbox One, PlayStation 5, Xbox Series X/S	Frostbite
2023	■ Battlefield 2042: Dark Creations	Windows, PlayStation 4, Xbox One, PlayStation 5, Xbox Series X/S	Frostbite
2024	■ Battlefield 2042: Turning Point	Windows, PlayStation 4, Xbox One, PlayStation 5, Xbox Series X/S	Frostbite
2025	■ Battlefield 2042: Road to Battlefield 6	Windows, PlayStation 4, Xbox One, PlayStation 5, Xbox Series X/S	Frostbite
2025	Battlefield 6	Windows, PlayStation 5, Xbox Series X/S	Frostbite
2025	■ Battlefield 6: Season 1	Windows, PlayStation 5, Xbox Series X/S	Frostbite
2026	■ Battlefield 6: Season 2	Windows, PlayStation 5, Xbox Series X/S	Frostbite
2026	■ Battlefield 6: Season 3	Windows, PlayStation 5, Xbox Series X/S	Frostbite
2026	■ Battlefield 6: Season 4	Windows, PlayStation 5, Xbox Series X/S	Frostbite
2026	■ Battlefield 6: Season 5	Windows, PlayStation 5, Xbox Series X/S	Frostbite
Notes: ■ DLC located directly below the title it was released for. † Was released exclusively for Xbox One in 4th quarter 2013, then was released for the remaining platforms in 1st quarter 2014.

== Development history ==
Aggregate review scores
Game	Year	Metacritic
Battlefield 1942	2002	89/100
Battlefield Vietnam	2004	84/100
Battlefield 2	2005	91/100
Battlefield 2142	2006	80/100
Battlefield 3	2011	PC: 89/100; PS3: 85/100; X360: 84/100
Battlefield 4	2013	PC: 81/100; PS3: 80/100; PS4: 85/100; X360: 79/100; XONE: 81/100
Battlefield 1	2016	PC: 88/100; PS4: 89/100; XONE: 87/100
Battlefield V	2018	PC: 81/100; PS4: 73/100; XONE: 78/100
Battlefield 2042	2021	PC: 68/100; PS5: 63/100; XSX/S: 64/100
Battlefield 6	2025	PC: 82/100; PS5: 83/100; XSX/S: 84/100

Battlefield 1942 was released on September 10, 2002, using the Refractor game engine, and set in World War II. It introduced the "Conquest" gameplay mode, in which players fought for "control points" throughout the map. Two expansion packs were released.

Battlefield Vietnam, released in 2004, moved the setting to the Vietnam War, and was built on an updated Refractor engine with various gameplay improvements, such as the ability to fire personal weapons while seated in vehicles, and visualizing dense foliage.

The 2005 release Battlefield 2 takes place in the modern day, depicting a war between the United States and China and the fictional Middle Eastern Coalition (MEC). Despite requiring numerous patches due to a large number of bugs and glitches in the game upon its release, it was a large commercial success, selling more than 2,250,000 copies worldwide, by July 2006. One expansion pack, Special Forces, which added Russia, exclusive missions, and new weapons and gadgets, and two booster packs, Armored Fury (adding three new battles in the USA) and Euro Force (adding the European Union), were also released. A similar game called Battlefield 2: Modern Combat was released for consoles, with a larger single player mode but limited online play.

Battlefield 2142 was released in 2006, taking place during a global ice age in the 22nd century. While most of it is graphically similar to Battlefield 2, it introduced a variety of equipment to unlock and battles between two giant "Titan" airships. The Northern Strike expansion pack was later released, adding new maps, vehicles, and a new game mode. Its use of in-game advertising was controversial among players and not well received.

Battlefield: Bad Company, released in 2008, is set in a near-future war between the United States and Russia, and follows a US Army company's escapades and their search for hidden gold. This new Battlefield game had a variety of vehicles for land, air and sea. It had a new destruction system that allowed the player to break and destroy environments, based on a new game engine named Frostbite, which replaced the Refractor engine used in earlier releases (with the exception of Battlefield 2: Modern Combat, which used RenderWare).

In 2009, EA released two download-only games, Battlefield Heroes, a free-to-play Refractor 2 engine game, supported by advertising and micropayments and Battlefield 1943, a Frostbite engine game, released in July 2009, for Xbox 360 and PlayStation 3, and was scheduled for release in Q1 2010, for PCs, but was cancelled.

In 2010, a sequel to Battlefield: Bad Company, Battlefield: Bad Company 2, was released, involving "B" Company's search for an electromagnetic pulse weapon. It features a larger multiplayer than its predecessor Bad Company, with updated graphics and realistic effects (e.g. bullet-drop). The game introduced the rush game mode and brought in weapons. It features a "VIP" system of content distribution where player with VIP codes gain early access to new maps. DICE also released an expansion for Bad Company 2, Battlefield: Bad Company 2: Vietnam, setting the game in the Vietnam War.

Battlefield 3 was announced in 2009, and in 2010 it was confirmed that gamers who pre-ordered Medal of Honor Limited Edition would receive Battlefield 3 forty-eight hours before the open beta was released. On February 4, 2011, the first teaser trailer for the game was revealed, with a preliminary release in the Fall of 2011. Among the new features that are introduced in the game include fighter jets, attack aircraft, and the ability to go prone. The game allows 64 (on the PC) players as in all previous Battlefield titles, though the consoles allow for 24-player matches. The Battlefield 3 Beta was released on September 29, 2011. Battlefield 3 was released on October 25, 2011, and has received high review scores and has received awards from IGN.

On November 5, 2010, EASY Studios announced a follow-up to its free-to-play Battlefield Heroes, Battlefield Play4Free. EASY develops the free-to-play variants of Battlefield. Its latest offering gives players the same free-to-play pricing structure of Heroes, while still offering a more serious, core Battlefield experience (as opposed to Heroes' lighthearted, cartoon-styled environment). Battlefield Play4Free went into open beta on April 4, 2011.

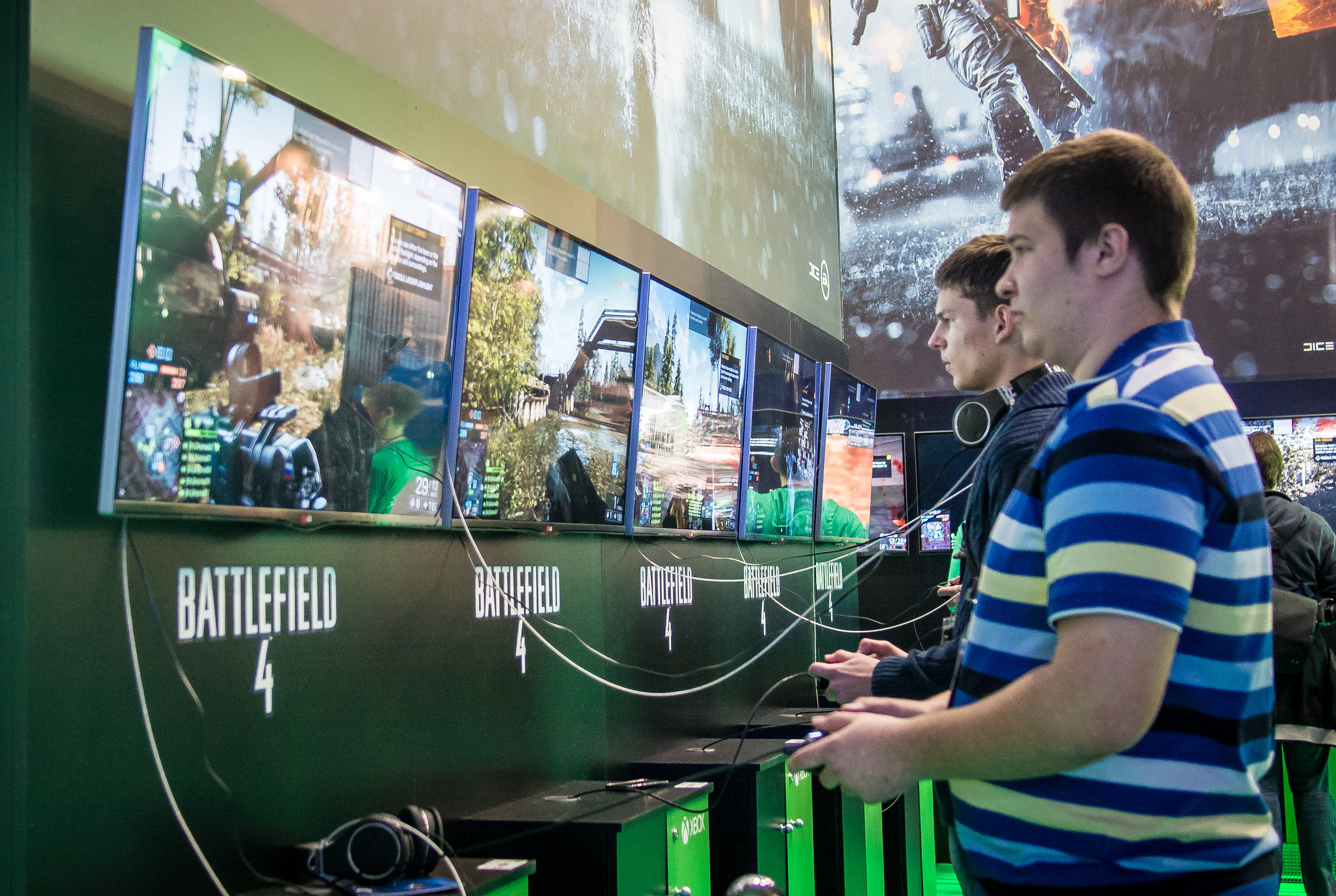
Players playing Battlefield 4 for Xbox

Battlefield 4 was announced on March 26, 2013. On July 17, 2012, it was announced that players who pre-order Medal of Honor: Warfighter would receive access to a Battlefield 4 beta. The beta for the game began on October 1 and ended on October 15 with a full release on October 29, 2013.

Information about the next entry in the series, Battlefield Hardline, was leaked on May 27, 2014, and officially unveiled on June 9, 2014, during E3. The game was developed by Visceral Games and, unlike previous installments in the franchise, is centered around a cops-and-robbers theme.

Battlefield: Bad Company 3 was an upcoming entry into the series, a follow-up to 2010's Battlefield: Bad Company 2. General Manager of DICE, Karl-Magnus Troedsson stated in a 2014 interview with Eurogamer that the game is not in active development as the studio doesn't know what exactly fans loved about the series as there has never been a clear line of the matter and they do not want to risk destroying the series. Despite this, DICE has made it clear that they will be developing Bad Company 3 at some point.

In July 2015, CFO of EA Blake Jorgensen announced a new Battlefield title would be released in 2016. This was followed up by Dan Vaderlind, EA DICE Development Director, announcing that since Star Wars Battlefront has been released, he will now be focused on the upcoming Battlefield title. On May 6, 2016, Battlefield 1 was officially announced, with an official reveal trailer on YouTube, and was released on October 21, 2016.

In a May 2018 live reveal event it was confirmed that it the next installment would be a World War II game after several leaks suggested it would be set during this period, with the title revealed as Battlefield V. Battlefield V was released later that year on November 20, 2018, while also offering certain players early access to the game as early as November 9, 2018.

Battlefield 2042 was released on November 19, 2021. During EA's 2020/2021 Q3 earnings call it was revealed that the game will be the first to release on PlayStation 5 and Xbox Series X|S, utilizing their processing power to feature more players than ever in the online portion of the game. Additionally, it saw multiple innovations in multiplayer, social, and competition aspects that are new to the franchise. After 2042 was met with a poor launch, it was announced that Oskar Gabrielson, the general manager of DICE, would be stepping down from his position, and Rebecka Coutaz, former managing director of Ubisoft Annecy, would replace him. Vince Zampella of Respawn Entertainment and Ripple Effect Studios (the latter of which had created 2042's Portal Mode) will be heading the Battlefield franchise. It was also reported that EA game director Marcus Lehto is building a new Seattle-based studio focused on story content for Battlefield, while Ripple Effect is developing a new "Battlefield experience" set in the game's universe.

Battlefield 6 was released on October 10, 2025. Following the critical derision to 2042, Vince Zampella of Respawn Entertainment was installed as Battlefield creative director. DICE developed the title; numerous studios under EA worked under the Battlefield Studios name, including Ripple Effect Studios (formerly DICE Los Angeles), Criterion Games, and Motive Studio. Zampella stated that the game was aiming for a grounded, serious tone, similar to Battlefield 3 and Battlefield 4. The game launched to critical and financial success, becoming the biggest launch in the series' history; a free battle royale mode, titled RedSec, was released on October 28. Battlefield 6 was Zampella's only title as Battlefield creative director, as he died in December 2025.

Battlefield Mobile was a cancelled free-to-play game for the Android, with an iOS release initially planned before the game's cancellation on January 31, 2023. An open beta was released in November 2022. The game was cancelled on January 31, 2023. The developer of the game, Industrial Toys, was also shut down.

== Other media ==
=== Canceled television series ===
In October 2012, Fox Broadcasting Company announced their intentions to make a one-hour-long television show based on Battlefield: Bad Company. The show was to be written by executive producer John Eisendrath and co-produced by Patrick Bach and Patrick O'Brien of Electronic Arts, and Doug Robinson of Happy Madison. Nothing has been developed after their announcement.

In July 2016, Paramount Television announced that it will adapt the game series for television. Anonymous Content's Michael Sugar and Ashley Zalta will executive produce. Nothing became of that, but Electronic Arts discussed a spinoff TV show or movie in September 2024.

=== Film ===
In April 2026, a film adaptation was announced with Christopher McQuarrie directing and Michael B. Jordan producing and possibly starring. A bidding war is currently taking place for distribution rights, with a priority for a theatrical release. In October 2026, Sony Pictures became the frontrunner to acquire distribution rights.
