= Battlefield 2142 =

2006 video game

- Developer: DICE
- Publisher: Electronic Arts
- Director: Lars Gustavsson
- Designer: Linus Josephson
- Composer: Gregor Narholz
- Series: Battlefield
- Platforms: Microsoft Windows, Mac OS X
- Release: Microsoft Windows: NA: October 17, 2006; AU: October 19, 2006; EU: October 20, 2006; Northern Strike: NA: March 8, 2007; EU: March 9, 2007; Mac OS X: NA: August 17, 2007; AU: November 5, 2007
- Genre: First-person shooter
- Modes: Single-player, multiplayer

Battlefield 2142 is a 2006 first-person shooter game developed by DICE and published by Electronic Arts. It is the fifth installment in the Battlefield series. Battlefield 2142 is set in 2142 and depicts a cold war between two military superpowers – the European Union (EU) and Pan Asian Coalition (PAC) – over the remaining unfrozen land during a new ice age.

The game was designed primarily for multiplayer gameplay and allows for a maximum of 64 players on a server or a maximum of 16 players in single player mode against bots on Conquest mode. It has its own ranking system to keep track of the user's statistics similar to the one used in its predecessor, Battlefield 2. It opens up new categories of vehicles and weapons not seen in Battlefield 2. Battlefield 2142 has an unlock system that allows the player to choose a new unlock every time they achieve a new rank instead of forcing the player to purchase items. A booster pack called Northern Strike contains new maps, unlocks, and vehicles; a deluxe edition was released that contains Battlefield 2142 and Northern Strike.

In July 2014, all online components of the game were deactivated following the shutdown of GameSpy. The game's online multiplayer was revived by the Project Revive community in 2016. However, the project was shut down in 2017 following a legal notice from Electronic Arts. Alternatives were made available shortly after Project Revive was shut down, including the 2142 Novgames Alliance project or the 2142 Reclamation Project.

== Gameplay ==
The player character looks towards an armoured walker that is being piloted by another player.

Battlefield includes two gameplay modes, Conquest and Titan, the latter of which can only be played online in multiplayer maps (without using modifications). Both modes support varying numbers of players, up to 64, depending upon the server a player chooses to join online. The single player mode consists of a maximum of 16 players, which includes 15 AI bots. Commander Mode from Battlefield 2 returns, as one player from each team can apply and either accept or turn down the role of becoming commander. The player in the commander position has vital roles in the game, such as deploying UAV's, artillery strikes, airdropping supplies or vehicles for their team.

=== Classes ===
Battlefield 2142 features four different playable kits (now known as classes). These kits can be selected at any time during gameplay. The kits are a combination of the kits in Battlefield 2, which had seven playable kits, but were less customizable and upgradeable in comparison. Each kit has different weapons and equipment that are unique. Each contains a basic weapon, a secondary weapon, and a knife. The knife differs in this game from Battlefield 2 because when a player is killed with a knife, the killer acquires the player's dogtag. The player is able to gain rank, options, and equipment by acquiring points in the game.

Battlefield 2142 has customization, allowing the player to gain more unlocks for one kit, which makes it more effective. Each class has two unlockable weapons and one passive unlock which upgrades the soldier's helmet, each helmet upgrade having different functions. The benefits of one soldier's helmet upgrade will be shared with their squadmates.

- Assault: The Assault and Medic classes from Battlefield 2 are combined as the Assault kit in Battlefield 2142. The main weapons are assault rifles with unlockable rocket or shotgun add-ons. Other unlocks include advanced first-aid kits which can be deployed to restore the health of anyone standing close to it, smoke grenades for screening, and a defibrillator for reviving fallen comrades.
- Engineer: The Engineer class works the same way it was intended since Battlefield 1942. Engineer can still repair vehicles and have the access to heavy weapons that can damage and destroy enemy vehicles, such as rocket launchers and mines.
- Support: The Support class provides ammunition with ammo boxes and can deploy turret guns and electric shields to help the team in the close quarters combat.
- Recon: The Recon kit is aimed to provide perimeter support for the team with high velocity sniper rifles. In the other hand the Lambert-carbine is a full-automatic carbine weapon suitable for the assault gameplay style and combined with RDX explosives and the cloaking device recon turns into special ops class.

=== Conquest ===
Conquest mode, similar to its predecessors, involves two teams of players fighting each other while working to capture and defend spawn points. Spawn points are represented by flags and display the color of the controlling faction. To hold a simple majority of flags will initiate a ticket drain on the opposing faction, which will only speed up if one faction controls all the flags. Both teams begin the match with a preset number of tickets. Each time a soldier dies, a ticket is removed from their team. Players have the opportunity to reduce their number of lost tickets by reviving their "critically wounded" teammates with the Assault class' defibrillator. By reviving a teammate within 15 seconds (or the amount of time the server has been set to), no ticket will be lost and the player will not need to respawn (the player who killed the now revived player will keep their kill point). The team that has no tickets, or no places to spawn with no one alive, loses the match.

There are several types of Conquest modes: Head-on, Assault, Assault Lines, and Double Assault Lines, Conquest Assault, No Vehicles.

- In Head-on, both teams start with one flag that cannot be captured. The rest of the flags are neutral.
- In Assault, play in either of the Assault Lines modes.
- In Conquest Assault, which is identical to normal Assault in both its coding and function, the PAC starts with one uncapturable flag (an immobile Titan), while the EU starts off with the rest of the flags and an immobile Titan which can be captured by the PAC.
- In No Vehicles, infantry are the only option, which will stack with the conquest mode that the map uses. No vehicles will spawn, including static ground turrets.

=== Titan ===
The Titan mode involves players from opposing teams whose objective is to destroy the other team's Titan, while trying to defend their own. Titans are massive, heavily armored, flying warships that have powerful force fields protecting them from enemy intrusion or conventional weapons fire. As the force fields are up during the first part of a battle, players must fight to control the anti-Titan missile silos scattered about the battlefield on the ground. Titans can be moved around the battlefield, but only by the team's Commander. Each Titan can defend itself and contribute to the fight on the ground with 4 anti-ground guns and 2 anti-aircraft guns. Titan movement can cause latency issues, so some players prefer not to move them at all. Some servers even disable the commander's ability to move the Titan.

After the shields are down, there are two methods to destroy the enemy Titan. One way is to simply remain on the ground and hold the anti-Titan missiles until they wear down the hull. A quicker alternative is to board the Titan using "assault pods" launched from an APC (Armored Personnel Carrier), air transport, Titan, or spawn beacon, spawn on your squad leader, or land an air transport on a Titan as a mobile spawn point. Once inside, the players must destroy 4 reactor consoles to gain access to the reactor room. There, they can blow up the reactor, and have 30 seconds to flee the Titan before it is destroyed.

During the beta release of the game, players who managed to escape the destroyed Titan before the 30-second timer ended received an award. In the retail game, the round ends when the Titan is destroyed, and because player deaths triggered by the end of a round do not count, the evacuation of the Titan had little significance aside from inciting a rush in the player. In patch 1.05, DICE reinstated the award for those attacking players who escaped the destruction in the "Titan Survival Pin." However, receiving the pin requires very precise timing to land on the ground, causing confusion amongst players initially.

=== Vehicles ===
The vehicles of Battlefield 2142 are similar to those in Battlefield 2 except for a more futuristic design. For example, the PAC team tank, the Type 32 Nekomata, has a hovercraft driving system. The air vehicles are more futuristic, propelled by turbines instead of rotors. Almost all vehicles have a short duration protective shield called active defense. The active defense protects the vehicle from all attacks (except for electromagnetic attacks) for about five seconds.

=== Statistics tracking ===
The ranking and points system of Battlefield 2142 is similar to Battlefield 2, however, different ranks are featured. As with Battlefield 2, a key feature of the game is "Character Persistence", which saves and tracks almost every aspect of gameplay for players. Unlike Battlefield 2, however, the user is given the option to create up to four soldiers, as opposed to Battlefield 2's limitation of one per account. When playing the game in online multiplayer mode on specified servers, a master server tracks player points, ranks, equipment, and other statistics.

=== Ranks ===
The Battlefield 2142 rank system consists of a number of partially fictitious, partially realistic military ranks, and are (for the most part) each divided by a silver/gold format, with players attaining the silver version of the rank (e.g. Corporal Silver) before reaching the gold rank (e.g. Corporal Gold). New ranks are earned by attaining experience points, which can be earned for actions on a ranked server such as killing an enemy soldier/vehicle, healing/resupplying teammates, repairing ally vehicles/strategic objects (SAT Track, UAV, Orbital Strike, and EMP Strike which are located at the main base), capturing/neutralizing control points/missile silos, assisting in kills (such as piloting a gunship) or carrying out orders given by the Squad Leader/Commander (negative points may be earned by actions such as teamkilling).

The rank system is designed to be progressive so ranks are earned faster when a player begins (for example, 40 points are needed to climb from the lowest to the 2nd lowest rank while 3600 points are needed to advance from the 2nd highest to the highest rank). This provides new players with a number of unlocks straight away to give them an edge (as well as ambition). Later ranks require more effort, time, and skill from the player as the extremely high number of points can usually be attained only through awards (which may give up to 2000 points apiece). The final three ranks of the game are only given to a certain number of players at a time, with Major General given to 50 players, Lieutenant General given to 25 players, and the highest rank, Supreme Commander, given to only one player at a time. These top three are brevet ranks; players retain those ranks until other players surpass them.

=== Awards ===
Awards can be earned only in multiplayer mode, with each award having its own specific criteria. Most awards typically have two to five criteria, composed of In A Round (IAR) criteria and Global criteria. IAR criteria must be accomplished within a single round, not through multiple rounds. Global criteria are accumulated by playing on a ranked server. For example, the Titan Commander badge (silver) requires a player to be the commander in Titan mode for twenty minutes in one round after accumulating 1000 commander points in Titan mode globally. Each award (with the exception of medals, which are more for prestige, since they are the hardest to obtain) delivers a certain number of experience points, which go towards attaining a new rank. Badges, which have three levels of achievement (bronze, silver, and gold), and ribbons deliver the most points, while pins offer very few points since they are relatively easy to get, and may be obtained more than once.

=== Unlocks ===
In Battlefield 2142, every time a player earns a new rank, they are able to choose a new unlock. Players with the Northern Strike Booster Pack are also able to earn unlocks by earning the badge or ribbon awards associated with Northern Strike. There are a total of 50 unlocks (40 Battlefield 2142 Core Game, 10 Northern Strike) and there are different categories of unlocks including class unlocks, squad unlocks, and ability unlocks. Class unlocks are specific to the class type which is being used. Ability unlocks are universal for all the classes. Squad unlocks can be equipped by anybody but they may only be used by squad leaders who have the required number of members in their squad. Unlocks are in tiers and require the player to progress up through the tree to unlock higher-level equipment. The player can test the other unlocks by picking up a dead soldier's equipment who is higher rank and contain more unlocks than the player.

A "Field Upgrade" is a temporary unlock which can be awarded to all members of a squad when they either kill, resupply, heal or revive a teammate while they are following an attack or defend order. The Field Upgrade is a sort of 'try before you buy' feature (while the player has their own customizable inventory), allowing players to experience certain unlocks before they use one of their hard earned unlock credits to unlock it. They only allow players to test the equipment one level higher on their original unlock tree. Field Upgrades will be available to the player until the player disconnects from the server. If a player unlocks a new item which they have already Field Upgraded on their current server, the next unlock will not become available to them for a Field Upgrade until they leave the server. Certain unlocks are only available after purchasing the Northern Strike booster pack, and they are on top of all the other unlocks in the unlock trees of the core game. Field Upgrades also allow players without Northern Strike to have temporary access to the upgrades that are only available in Northern Strike. Field Upgrades are only applicable on ranked servers.

== Synopsis ==
In the year 2106, a new ice age began. As the ice expanded, millions of people all over the world were displaced, particularly in Russia and Japan. Combined with their increasing inability to find sufficient natural resources, the Pan Asian Coalition grows desperate. Meanwhile, the European Union is able to withstand the displacements and find sufficient resources, mostly from North Africa due to their relationship with the Union of African States (Africa remaining mostly ice-free). Seeing this, the PAC launches a full-scale invasion of Europe and North Africa in 2139, beginning the Cold War of the 22nd century, a war for the world's last remaining land and resources.

The Final Stand multiplayer expansion pack for Battlefield 4 gives new insight about the cold war, revealing that the PAC was formed as early as 2020 (the year Battlefield 4 takes place) as early versions of the coalition's symbol can be seen. Furthermore, early prototypes of Titans and other vehicles and futuristic technology were already in development in 2020 by the PAC in remote regions of Russia.

== Development ==
Battlefield 2142 was rumored to be in development ever since a 30-second video was leaked to the Internet in January 2006. The video described itself as an "internal test." The proof of concept depicts the game's various vehicles storming through a futuristic city. A screenshot depicting the walker was taken from this video and subsequently used in marketing for the game. The rumors began in earnest following a February 2006 interview with Dan Blackstone, a senior producer from Electronic Arts, in which he mentioned "We're about to announce something very big, so stay tuned. One other interviewer asked this and I gave him a hint, so it's only fair that I do the same for you: 3213/3*2. Or said another way: S.R. 4588164."

The square root ("S.R.") of 4588164 is 2142 (3213÷3×2 equals 2142 as well), hence the rumors. The only proof of existence was the cover story of the PC Gamer magazine and the trailer, published on the very same magazine, until March 21, 2006, when Electronic Arts and DICE announced that the next game in the Battlefield series would be Battlefield 2142, in their March 21, 2006 Community Update.

Several pieces of early concept art were released onto the internet. However, during a hacking attack on the board where the images were posted, most of the images were lost. Early in the development process, the game was set on a different planet, as hinted by three moons in the sky in one piece of concept art. Additionally, it was to be the United States, rather than the European Union, versus the Pan-Asian Coalition, and several files within the game indicate the U.S. (most notably the texture files used by the EU and PAC, with the EU folder being labeled 'US' rather than 'EU').

In the Battlefield 2 Armored Fury Booster Pack map Midnight Sun, there was a drivable muscle car with license plate number 2142. Additionally in Armored Fury, there was a billboard advertising a digital wrist watch, which displays '21:42' as the time, and a Mushroom cloud with the caption message, "Watch For The Future." Additionally in Armored Fury, the drivable semi-truck had a magazine on the passenger seat that reads "Ice Age Approaches."

Battlefield 2142 was officially announced and playable at E3 2006."

The Battlefield 2142 beta was released in the third week of August. However, it was revealed that the beta was not a complete "open" beta upon its release. At first, the general belief was that it was to be a FilePlanet subscriber-only beta, but it was later revealed to additionally have an invite system. At that time the beta was only available to certain FilePlanet subscribers (keys were given out on a first-come, first-served basis) and those who were invited. Some fan-sites had been holding contests giving out invitations to the BF2142 beta as prizes. On August 31, a large number of keys were given out by FilePlanet for free, and the beta client was upgraded. The FilePlanet beta ended on September 12, 2006. It was noted by many users that at the beginning of the beta the game worked great, but by the end it was horribly broken, with players getting stuck in walls and titans disappearing into thin air. It was decided to ship it anyway.

At the 2007 WWDC, it was announced that Battlefield 2142 would be released for Macintosh computers in July 2007. It was released in 2007, for Mac OS X. Since the game uses Cedega it will only work with Intel based Macintosh systems and not PowerPC.

=== Advertising components ===
Battlefield 2142 shipped with dynamic in-game advertising provided by IGA Worldwide. A similar system is featured in games such as Battlefield 2, Splinter Cell: Chaos Theory, and PlanetSide. The system changes advertisements on objects such as billboards in-game. These in-game advertisements have been dubbed adware by some, and there has been a vocal backlash against this element of the game.

Additionally, much of the recent "advertising space" has been used to show propaganda for new in game features and helping to feed rumors of a new game type in the works. Intel has advertised in the game, and recently the Discovery Channel has placed advertising in the game for their Future Weapons series. More recently advertisements for the DVD release of the movie Ghost Rider have appeared.

An in-house advertisement for Battlefield: Bad Company have appeared recently, stating such things as "Celebrating the 134th anniversary of the Battlefield: Bad Company demo."

Another current one is advertising the DVD and Blu-ray release of I Am Legend. Billboards without paid advertisements generally have recruitment posters for the factions, and ads for "DICE Travel." These travel ads sell the reader into going to the various maps, such as Verdun or Berlin, for £2142, with taglines such as "Gun not included" and "One-way." Some billboard ads recently added after the new year can be found during the gameplay saying "Happy 2143 EU Soldiers!" Additionally there is a reference to the sci-fi film Starship Troopers, and by extension, World War II recruitment posters, on billboards featuring the slogan – "He's Doing His Part. Are You?"

Ads have also recently appeared for the Northern Strike booster pack, displaying pictures like those of the Goliath, with a tag line of "A soldier's best friend", and PAC propaganda posters with the faction flag and a line reading "Европа завоёвана!" ("Europe is conquered!"), in Russian. In the UK, ads consist almost entirely of ads for Intel Core 2 Duo which states "Battle-Tested" and EA's own Northern Strike. More recently in Britain (August 2007), the bank Lloyds TSB placed adverts in-game showing various accounts and products available from them. Also recently, billboards sporting ads for Battlefield: Bad Company have been popping up. The most recent of which being advertisements for Bad Company's free Conquest mode addition.

=== Updates ===
EA Games released five updates for Battlefield 2142. These addressed various issues in-game, some of which are causes of minor imbalance (for example, a bug causing the missiles of one faction's gunships to be homing while the other faction's gunship had "dumb" missiles). However some players complained that minor issues (such as small bullet deviation adjustments to guns) were repeatedly tweaked while major issues (exploits which allowed sentry guns to locate players behind walls, allowed critically wounded players to "see through" the whole Titan, and "Pod Surfing" which would allow players who altered their controls to extend the APCs' and Squad Leader Beacons' drop pod range almost infinitely) remained unaddressed. Certain fixes have also created more problems. For instance, an exploit that allows players to reach normally inaccessible locations such as high rooftops was remedied in the 1.25 update. However, the fix had repercussions in the form of equipment that can kill the player or become stuck on map geometry. Patch 1.4 fixed many of these exploits and enhanced certain features of the game. Three major additions (in 1.40) are the new map Highway Tampa, and an auto save feature that saves the last kit layout used for each class (although there have been noted problems with certain weapons and gadgets randomly being saved incorrectly). The 1.40 update allows a second gunship to spawn on each titan after the first one has taken off. In the Highway Tampa map, there are a total of three gunships per faction. Patch 1.50 was released for Windows-based systems on May 30, 2008, and includes 2 new maps – Wake Island and Operation Shingle – as well as numerous bug fixes and game enhancements; a mid-June 2008 announcement on the Battlefield website indicated that Patch 1.50 would eventually also be released for the Mac OS; the Mac patch became available. The latest patch to date, Version 1.51, featured the 4 new maps of Molokai, Yellowknife, Operation Blue Pearl, and Strike at Karkand as well as a Northern Strike booster pack.

=== Music ===
An official soundtrack has been released, containing 14 songs, including a new version of the classic Battlefield: 1942 theme. Each song (excluding tracks 1, 6, 7, and 14) corresponds with a map from the game. All tracks were composed by Gregor Narholz.

Battlefield: 2142 (Original Game Soundtrack)

Soundtrack album by Gregor Narholz
- Genre: Video game soundtrack
- Length: 34:05

Battlefield: 2142 (Original Game Soundtrack) (34:05)
No.	Title	Writer(s)	Length
1.	"Battlefield: 2142 Main Theme"	Gregor Narholz	3:18
2.	"Belgrade"	Gregor Narholz	2:12
3.	"Camp Gibraltar"	Gregor Narholz	2:28
4.	"Cerbere Landing"	Gregor Narholz	2:34
5.	"Fall of Berlin"	Gregor Narholz	2:14
6.	"Lose Round"	Gregor Narholz	0:37
7.	"Menu Music"	Gregor Narholz	5:28
8.	"Minsk"	Gregor Narholz	2:19
9.	"Shuhia Taiba"	Gregor Narholz	2:32
10.	"Sidi Power Plant"	Gregor Narholz	2:30
11.	"Suez Canal"	Gregor Narholz	2:32
12.	"Tunis Harbor"	Gregor Narholz	2:37
13.	"Verdun"	Gregor Narholz	2:17
14.	"Win Round"	Gregor Narholz	0:36

== Release ==
=== Demo ===
EA released an online-only standalone demo of the retail game, featuring the Sidi Power Plant map, with either conquest or Titan modes. Demo versions were limited to demo-only servers, of which a few were initially run by EA, but were quickly supplanted by player run servers.

Ranked points or unlocks could not be earned in the demo, though several demo servers ran their own ranking system. The demo was not updated in parallel with the complete game, and so several exploitable glitches and bugs existed, though most were patched or policed by the demo modding community and server admins. Unlike in the full game, a modding community thrived within the demo servers, primarily because of the static frozen environment untouched by patches, and the desire and competition between server administrators, to create fresh and diverse features to add to an otherwise limited gaming environment.

EA discontinued support for the demo August 11, 2011; it is no longer possible to create a player character in the demo game client, or login with an existing demo account to an EA player database server, which essentially renders the demo game no longer functional.

=== Retail bonuses ===
- Collector's Edition: A Collector's Edition of the game was released on DVD, which came in a numbered metal box. This edition came with a Battlefield 2142 chain and handphone strap, as well as a free rank.
- Best Buy: Players who pre-ordered Battlefield 2142 from Best Buy were not only given a free 64MB dog tag styled flash drive, but also a free "downloadable assault weapon", which replaced the existing standard EU assault rifle (Scar 11), with the "Bofors Defense Machine Gun", which was a cosmetically changed version of the same weapon. The Bofors Defense Machine Gun causes many players to reinstall the game and sell the code for the price difference because of the massive size of the weapon compared to the SCAR 11.
- GameStop: Players who pre-ordered Battlefield 2142 from GameStop received a free in-game rank. This rank was stackable with the Battlefield 2 Veteran's Program promotion, allowing players to begin halfway through the second rank upon release of the retail game.
- BF2 Veterans Program: People that played Battlefield 2 could participate in a "Veterans Program" that let them reserve their name for Battlefield 2142 before launch, get an immediate in-game rank-up, placed the red '2' from the Battlefield 2 logo next to their in-game BF2142 username during play, and receive exclusive verbal taunts to use against other players in Battlefield 2.

== Reception ==
Battlefield 2142

Aggregate score
Aggregator	Score
Metacritic	80/100

Review scores
Publication	Score
Edge	8/10
Eurogamer	7/10
Game Informer	8.5/10
GamePro	3.75/5
GameRevolution	B+
GameSpot	8.1/10
GameTrailers	8.4/10
GameZone	8/10
IGN	8.4/10
PC Format	78%
PC Gamer (UK)	83%
PC Gamer (US)	86%
PC Zone	86%
411Mania	8.8/10

Battlefield 2142 received a "Silver" sales award from the Entertainment and Leisure Software Publishers Association (ELSPA), indicating sales of at least 100,000 copies in the United Kingdom.

Battlefield 2142 generally received positive reviews according to review aggregator Metacritic. Hyper's Kosta Andreadis commended the game for its "Titan Mode, refined reward and promotion system [and] well designed maps". However, he criticized it for "lag issues when boarding Titans".

Months after the buggy initial release, EA released a patch which resolved most of the game's bugs; official widescreen support didn't come until the 1.5 patch was released for the PC version of the game on May 30, 2008. The Mac version of the patch was released two months later, on August 1, 2008.

During the 10th Annual Interactive Achievement Awards, the Academy of Interactive Arts & Sciences nominated Battlefield 2142 for "Computer Game of the Year" and "Outstanding Achievement in Online Gameplay".

== Northern Strike ==
On March 8, 2007, Electronic Arts released the Northern Strike booster pack for the Battlefield 2142 game. Northern Strike was made available for all players with the game's final patch, released 2011.

In Northern Strike, the battle moves to northern and central Europe and is set in 2145. The PAC has set up strongholds in the urban areas left abandoned due to their constant assault, and the advancing ice sheets. The EU launches an offensive to take back its land from the PAC. This fictional invasion greatly resembles the 1944 invasion of Normandy, when Europe was finally reclaimed by Allied Forces.

The booster pack contains ten new unlocks, three new maps, two new vehicles, and a new game mode called Assault Lines. The booster pack was exclusively available through the EA Link for $9.95 US$; Since January 2008, Battlefield 2142 Deluxe Edition contains Northern Strike. It is now available from retailers outside the U.S.

=== Awards and unlocks ===
Northern Strike contains eleven new awards: Four new ribbons, two new badges (with three ranks each), and a new pin. Each new award in Northern Strike is worth one equipment unlock credit including each level of the badges for a total of ten unlock credits (except the pin, which is worth 10 career points toward a player's in-game rank). While these unlocks can be used to unlock Northern Strike items, they can also be used to unlock items from the core game. While it is not possible to permanently acquire Northern Strike unlocks without purchasing the expansion, they can be chosen as Field Upgrades if the unlocks preceding them are unlocked, or can be used by picking up the equipment of a fallen soldier if that soldier had a Northern Strike unlock equipped when they died.

=== Maps ===
Northern Strike offers three new maps, Bridge at Remagen, Liberation of Leipzig, and Port Bavaria. The new maps, which are the only available maps for Assault Lines (excepting the Highway Tampa map, obtained through the 1.40 patch), are the only maps that spawn either of the new vehicles, and feature relatively large numbers of Battlewalkers but no tanks and little air support outside of Titan Mode, which is also available on the Port Bavaria and Bridge at Remagen maps. They also feature a new "Horizontal Pod Launcher" structure that functions similarly to the Pod Launchers found on the Titans (but with reduced range and a maximum time after the player gets in until the pod is automatically launched).

=== Assault Lines ===
Assault Lines mode is similar to Conquest, but with a couple of major differences. Most asymmetrical Conquest maps feature the PAC as the attacking force with the EU defending, whereas Assault Lines reverses the roles. In Assault Lines, the APCs on Port Bavaria and the Goliath are spawn points for troops, much like they are in Titan mode, however the Goliath may not be stolen by the other team. Finally, the PAC home base cannot be captured until every other base on the map belongs to the EU team before they can begin claiming the base as their own. Completion of this awards a pin to those playing as EU at the time, players who switch teams after the home base has been captured do not receive the pin. If the PAC successfully recaptures the base and controls at least one other point on the map then it becomes locked again while the EU can not lock this point even through controlling all other points on the map.

=== Reception ===
Battlefield 2142: Northern Strike

Aggregate score
Aggregator	Score
Metacritic	77/100

Review scores
Publication	Score
Eurogamer	7/10
GameSpot	7.7/10
GameZone	8/10
PC Format	70%
PC Gamer (UK)	81%
PC Zone	65%

Northern Strike received "generally favorable reviews", albeit slightly less than the original Battlefield 2142, according to Metacritic.
