= Index of DOS games (P) =

This is an index of DOS games.

This list has been split into multiple pages. Please use the Table of Contents to browse it.

Title	Released	Developer(s)	Publisher(s)
P-38 Lightning Tour of Duty	1991	Lucasfilm Games	LucasArts
P-80 Shooting Star Tour of Duty	1991	LucasArts	LucasArts
Pacific Islands	1992	Oxford Digital Enterprises	Empire Interactive
Pacific Strike	1994	Origin Systems	Electronic Arts
Pac-in-Time	1994	Kalisto	Mindscape
Pac-Man	1983	Designer Software	Atarisoft
Paganitzu	1991	Keith Schuler	Apogee Software
Palace of Deceit, The: The Secret of Castle Lockemoer	1991	Cliff Bleszinski	Atomic Revolution Software
Paladin	1988	Omnitrend Software	Omnitrend Software
Paladin II	1992	Impressions Games	Omnitrend Software
Pandora Directive, The	1996	Access Software	Access Software
Pang	1990	Mitchell Corporation	Ocean Software
Pango	1983	Sheng-Chung Liu	Sheng-Chung Liu
Panzer General	1994	Strategic Simulations	Strategic Simulations
Paparazzi!: Tales of Tinseltown	1995	Museworthy	Activision
Paperboy	1988	Magpie Computer Developments Ltd	Elite Systems
Paperboy 2	1991	Manley & Associates	Mindscape
Paranoia	1993	Phoenix Arts	Phoenix Arts
Paratrooper	1982	Greg Kuperberg	Orion Software
Patrician, The	1993	Triptychon	Ascon GmbH
Patriot	1993	Artech	Three-Sixty Pacific
Patton Versus Rommel	1987	Chris Crawford	Electronic Arts
Pawn, The	1986	Magnetic Scrolls	Rainbird Software
PC Fútbol	1993	Dinamic Multimedia	Dinamic Multimedia
PC Fútbol 5.0	1996	Dinamic Multimedia	Dinamic Multimedia
Pepper's Adventures in Time	1993	Sierra On-Line	Sierra On-Line
Perestroika	1989	LocIS	LocIS
Perry Mason: The Case of the Mandarin Murder	1985	Telarium Corp.	Telarium Corp.
Personal Nightmare	1989	Horror Soft	Box Office, Inc.
PGA Tour Golf	1990	Sterling Silver Software	Electronic Arts
PGA Tour Golf: Tournament Course Disk	1991	Sterling Silver Software	Electronic Arts
PGA Tour Golf 486	1994	Hitmen Productions	Electronic Arts
PGA European Tour	1994	Polygames	Electronic Arts
PGA Tour 96	1995	Hitmen Productions	Electronic Arts
Phantasie	1985	Strategic Simulations	Strategic Simulations
Phantasie Bonus Edition	1991	Strategic Simulations	WizardWorks
Phantasie III : The Wrath of Nikademus	1988	Strategic Simulations	Strategic Simulations
Phantasmagoria	1995	Sierra On-Line, Kronos Digital	Sierra On-Line
Phantasmagoria: A Puzzle of Flesh	1996	Sierra On-Line	Sierra On-Line
Phantasmagoria Stagefright	1999	Sierra On-Line	Sierra On-Line
Pharaoh's Revenge	1988	Manley & Associates	Publishing International
Pharaoh's Tomb	1990	Micro FX Software	Apogee Software
PHM Pegasus	1988	Lucasfilm Games	Electronic Arts
Pickle Wars	1993	Karen Crowther	MVP Software
Pictionary	1989	Oxford Mobius	Domark
Pinball Construction Set	1985	Electronic Arts	Electronic Arts
Pinball Dreams	1993	21st Century Entertainment	Digital Illusions
Pinball Dreams II	1994	Spidersoft	21st Century Entertainment
Pinball Fantasies	1994	Digital Illusions	21st Century Entertainment
Pinball Fantasies Deluxe	1994	Digital Illusions	21st Century Entertainment
Pinball Illusions	1995	Digital Illusions	21st Century Entertainment
Pinball Mania	1995	Spidersoft	21st Century Entertainment
Pipe Mania	1989	The Assembly Line	Empire Interactive, LucasArts
Pirates! Gold	1993	MicroProse	MicroProse
Pirates of the Barbary Coast	1987	Starsoft Development Laboratories	Keypunch Software
Pitfall II: Lost Caverns	1984	Activision	Activision
Pit-Fighter	1991	Oxford Mobius	Domark
Pitstop II	1984	Synergistic Software	Epyx
Pizza Tycoon	1994	Cybernetic Corporation	Software 2000
Plan 9 From Outer Space	1992	Gremlin Graphics	Gremlin Graphics
Planetfall	1983	Infocom	Infocom
Planet's Edge	1991	New World Computing	New World Computing
Planet X3	2019	David Murray	David Murray
Platoon	1987	Quicksilver Software	Data East
Playroom, The	1989	Broderbund	Broderbund
Plundered Hearts	1987	Infocom	Infocom
Pole Position	1983	Atari	Atarisoft
Pole Position II	1988	Mindscape	Mindscape
Police Quest: In Pursuit of the Death Angel	1987, 1992	Sierra On-Line	Sierra On-Line
Police Quest 2: The Vengeance	1988	Sierra On-Line	Sierra On-Line
Police Quest 3: The Kindred	1991	Sierra On-Line	Sierra On-Line
Police Quest 4: Open Season	1993	Sierra On-Line	Sierra On-Line
Pool of Radiance	1988	Strategic Simulations	Strategic Simulations
Pools of Darkness	1991	Strategic Simulations	Strategic Simulations
Populous	1989	Bullfrog Productions	Electronic Arts
Populous: The Promised Lands	1989	Bullfrog Productions	Electronic Arts
Populous II: Trials of the Olympian Gods	1993	Bullfrog Productions	Electronic Arts
Portal	1986	Nexa Corporation	Activision
Ports of Call	1987	Martin Ulrich, Rolf Dieter Klein	Aegis Interactive Entertainment
Power Dolls	1994	Kogado Software Products	Kogado Software Products
Power Drift	1990	Activision	Activision
Powermonger	1990	Bullfrog Productions	Electronic Arts
PowerSlave	1996	Lobotomy Software	Playmates Interactive
Pray for Death	1996	Light Shock Software	Virgin Interactive
Predator 2	1990	Oxford Mobius, Arc Developments	Konami
Prehistorik	1991	Titus Interactive	Titus Interactive
Prehistorik 2	1993	Titus Interactive	Titus Interactive
Premier Manager	1992	Realms of Fantasy	Gremlin Interactive
Premier Manager 2	1993	Realms of Fantasy	Gremlin Interactive
Premier Manager 3	1994	Realms of Fantasy	Gremlin Interactive
President Elect: 1988 Edition	1987	Strategic Simulations	Strategic Simulations
President Is Missing, The	1988	Cosmi Corporation	MicroProse
Press Your Luck	1989	The Williams Carruthers Company	GameTek
Presumed Guilty!	1989	Cosmi Corporation	Cosmi Corporation
Primal Rage	1994	Probe Entertainment	Time Warner Interactive
Prince of Persia	1989	Broderbund	Broderbund
Prince of Persia 2: The Shadow and the Flame	1994	Broderbund	Broderbund
Princess Maker	1993	Gainax	Gainax
Princess Maker 2	1996	Gainax	Adventions
Prisoner 2	1983	Edu-Ware	Edu-Ware
Prisoner of Ice	1995	Chaosium	Infogrames
Privateer 2: The Darkening	1996	Origin Systems	Electronic Arts
Project-X	1992	Team17	Team17
Prophecy 1: The Viking Child	1991	Imagitec Design	Imagitec Design
Prophecy of the Shadow	1992	Strategic Simulations	Strategic Simulations
Prophecy, The	1993	Coktel Vision, MDO	Sierra On-Line
Prophecy: The Fall of Trinadon	1989	Activision	Activision
Pro Pinball: The Web	1995	Cunning Development	Empire Interactive
Pro Pinball: Timeshock	1997	Cunning Development	Empire Interactive
Pro Tennis Tour	1989	Blue Byte	Ubi Soft
Pro Tennis Tour 2	1991	Blue Byte	Ubi Soft
Protostar: War on the Frontier	1993	Tsunami Media	Tsunami Media
Psi-5 Trading Company	1986	Accolade, Inc.	Accolade, Inc.
Psionics	1993	Adam Stanchos	
Psychic Detective	1995	Colossal Pictures	Electronic Arts
Psycho Pinball	1994	Codemasters	Codemasters
PT-109	1987	Digital Illusions	Spectrum Holobyte
P.T.O.: Pacific Theater of Operations	1993	Koei	Koei
P.T.O. II: Pacific Theater of Operations	1993	Koei	Koei
Pulse	1996	Albino Frog Software	Albino Frog Software
Punisher, The	1990	Paragon Software	MicroProse
Pure Wargame, The	1995	Quantum Quality Productions	Quantum Quality Productions
Purple Saturn Day	1989	ERE Informatique	Epyx
Pushover	1992	Red Rat Software	Ocean Software
Putt-Putt and Fatty Bear's Activity Pack	1994	Humongous Entertainment	Humongous Entertainment
Putt-Putt Goes to the Moon	1993	Humongous Entertainment	Humongous Entertainment
Putt-Putt Joins the Parade	1992	Humongous Entertainment	Humongous Entertainment
Putt-Putt's Fun Pack	1993	Humongous Entertainment	Humongous Entertainment
Puzznic	1990	Banana Development Corporation	Taito
Pyrotechnica	1995	Psygnosis	Psygnosis
