= Analogue 3D =

Home video game console

- Developer: Analogue
- Manufacturer: Analogue Inc.
- Type: Home video game console
- Generation: Eighth generation
- Released: November 18, 2025
- Introductory price: $249.99 (launch), $269.99 (post-tariff)
- Media: Nintendo 64 Game Paks
- CPU: Intel Cyclone 10 GX (220,000 logic elements)
- Storage: 16 GB microSD card (pre-installed)
- Graphics: HDMI 2.1 (4K, HDR, VRR)
- Sound: 48 kHz 16-bit PCM
- Controller input: Up to 4 N64 controllers (or compatible)
- Connectivity: Dual-band Wi-Fi, Bluetooth 5.0 LE, 2× USB-A
- Power: 30W
- Current firmware: 1.5.0
- Dimensions: 180 by 230 by 49 millimetres (7.1 in × 9.1 in × 1.9 in)
- Weight: 837 grams (1.845 lb; 29.5 oz)
- Marketing target: Retro gamers
- Backward compatibility: 100% N64 library, region-free
- Related: Analogue Pocket, Analogue Super Nt, Analogue Nt mini

The Analogue 3D (stylized as Analogue^{3D}) is a video game clone designed by Analogue, that is marketed as a reimagining of the Nintendo 64 (N64).

It was released on November 18, 2025 and uses field-programmable gate array (FPGA) technology to play N64 game cartridges in 4K resolution. It is the first fully FPGA-based recreation of the Nintendo 64 hardware.

== History ==
The Analogue 3D was first announced on October 16, 2023, with Analogue CEO Christopher Taber claiming it would offer a superior experience compared to Nintendo's own N64 emulation on Nintendo Switch Online, stating that software emulation "results in an experience that feels unjustly and wrongly aged." It was initially referred to as the "Analogue 64" before the official name was announced.

On October 16, 2024, one year after the initial announcement, Analogue revealed the full specifications and pricing. Pre-orders opened on October 21, 2024, at $249.99, and the console quickly sold out.

The release was delayed multiple times. Initially scheduled for Q1 2025, it was pushed to July 2025 in March (for development refinements), then to late August 2025 (citing tariff complications), and finally to Q4 2025 in August (for the final 1% completion). Analogue stated the console was "99% complete" and that the delays were to ensure quality standards. Customers were given the option to cancel their pre-order until the final confirmation in November 2025.

Pre-orders began shipping on November 18, 2025, with all pre-orders fulfilled before December 1, 2025. A restock was announced for November 24, 2025, with an increased price of $269.99 due to tariffs.

== Design ==
The Analogue 3D is built around an Intel Cyclone 10GX FPGA chip. Unlike software emulation, which attempts to mimic hardware through software, the FPGA recreates the original N64 hardware at the circuit level, allowing for direct interfacing with original cartridges and accessories. According to Analogue, the console was developed over nearly four years of dedicated FPGA engineering to achieve 100% compatibility with the entire N64 game library.

The console's design is physically based on a minimalist version of the original N64 and launched with black and white color options, while a limited-edition version of the system with a transparent casing was later sold in additional colors. It includes four original-style N64 controller ports that accept original controllers and accessories without adapters, including the Transfer Pak, Controller Pak, and Rumble Pak. The Analogue 3D has built-in Expansion Pak support, which can be toggled on or off in the settings.

The operating system, called 3DOS, is an evolution of Analogue OS used by the Analogue Pocket, redesigned in 4K exclusively for the Analogue 3D. It includes features for managing screenshots, saves, and a game library system.

=== Original Display Modes ===
A key feature of the Analogue 3D is its Original Display Modes (ODMs), which provide meticulously reproduced recreations of various CRT display types. The console offers five display mode options:

Mode	Description
BVM	Simulates a high-line-count professional broadcast video monitor with customizable beam convergence and edge settings
PVM	Simulates a medium-line-count professional video monitor
CRT	Replicates consumer CRT televisions that most N64 players originally used
Scanlines	Provides prominent scanline effects without RGB masks
Clean	Removes all filters for sharp pixel edges

Each display mode features extensive customization options including horizontal and vertical beam convergence (consumer, professional, or off), edge overshoot, edge hardness (soft or hard), and image size/fit settings.

=== Performance Modes ===
The Analogue 3D includes several performance enhancement modes that allow overclocking of the emulated N64 hardware:

Mode	Description
Auto	Default settings matching original hardware behavior
Enhanced	Moderate performance improvements
Enhanced+	Greater performance improvements
Unleashed	Maximum overclocking with up to 50% faster RCP and 33% faster CPU

These modes can significantly improve frame rates in CPU-intensive games like Perfect Dark and GoldenEye 007, which were notorious for slowdown on original hardware.

== Firmware ==
Analogue has released several firmware updates since launch:

Version	Date	Notable changes
1.1.0	2025-11-18	Initial 3DOS update release
1.1.9	2025-11-28	Substantial upgrades to Unleashed mode overclock; manual region selection; "Disable Texture Filtering" feature; improved compatibility for Bomberman Hero (PAL) and Super Smash Bros.; enhanced SD connect mode support
1.2.0	2026-01-30	Fixed HDMI issues; Forced disabled Expansion Pak with Space Station Silicon Valley (USA) to prevent game breaking bug; Library now tracks and displays when a game is added as well as total playtime per game; Introduced 'Force Progressive Output'; Adds Support for Switch Online N64 controller and alerts when 8BitDo controller has old firmware.
1.2.1	2026-02-13	Fixed when game playtime is over 24 hours.
1.2.2	2026-02-27	Added startup options to allowing starting the game that's currently inserted at boot; Added 'Power Off" to system menu.
1.2.3	2026-03-13	Fixes Gameshark compatibility and game detection.
1.2.4	2026-03-28	Added game header change detection, if a game changes the header it is properly detected and added to the library; Added 'Ready' label above currently inserted game and the ability to press 'B' to jump to the currently inserted game in the library.
1.2.5	2026-04-10	Advanced HDR and Max Luminence settings are added; Alphabetical listing of the library is added, pressing 'UP' in the Library to display the alphabetical index and select a letter by moving Left and Right. Press Down to return to the Library.
1.2.6	2026-04-24	Cartridges in the library now have colors and can be customized to Gray, Red, Green, Blue, Yellow, Gold, Black, Purple, or Pink; Long game titles now scroll.
1.3.0	2026-05-15	Save States, called Memories, are introduced.
1.4.0	2026-06-23	Screenshots are now supported, and a gallery is introduced.
1.5.0	2026-07-21	Internal Graphical Upscaling is introduced, alongside significant speed and QoL improvements on Memories/Save State loading.
1.5.1	2026-09-23	Overclocking and Force Original Hardware settings can be toggled while in a game. Unknown cartridges can now have custom names and other info in the Library now.
1.6.0	2026-11-18	NEW: WiFi is enabled with support for automatic OS updates and automatic time synchronization. Fixed "USA" tab not being displayed in the library.
1.6.1	2026-11-20	Improved bindings for on screen keyboard. Enabled support for very long WiFi cradentals. Fixed intermittent Wi-Fi connection with mixed WPA2/WPA3 and PMF is set to Optional.

== Hardware ==
=== Specifications ===
Component	Specification
Dimensions	180 × 230 × 49 mm (7.1 × 9.1 × 1.9 in)
Weight	837 g (1 lb 13.5 oz)
FPGA	Intel Cyclone 10GX with 220,000 logic elements
Video output	HDMI 2.1 with 4K resolution, HDR support, VRR
Audio	48 kHz 16-bit PCM
Connectivity	Dual-band Wi-Fi, Bluetooth 5.0 (Classic and LE)
I/O	4× N64 controller ports, N64 cartridge slot, 2× USB-A ports, USB-C (power), microSD card slot, HDMI output
Power	USB-C with 30W PD 3.0 (GaN, 100–240V, 50/60 Hz)
Compatibility	100% N64 game library, region-free, supports original controllers and accessories

=== Box contents ===
- Analogue 3D console
- 16 GB microSD card (pre-installed)
- HDMI cable
- USB cable
- Worldwide USB-C power supply

Note: Controllers are sold separately.

=== Compatible controllers ===
Officially compatible controllers include:

- 8BitDo 64 Controller (wireless)
- 8BitDo Mod Kit for Original N64 Controller
- Original N64 Controller
  - Rumble Pak
  - Controller Pak
  - Transfer Pak
- Nintendo Switch Online N64 Controller
- Tsuricon 64
- Densha de Go! 64 Controller
- ASCII Wheel
- N64 Mouse
- Bio Sensor
- Voice Recognition Unit

==== 8BitDo 64 Bluetooth Controller ====
Analogue partnered with 8BitDo to create the 8BitDo 64 Bluetooth Controller, designed specifically for use with the Analogue 3D. The controller features:

- Hall-effect joysticks with metal joystick rings to prevent the degradation issues that plagued original N64 controllers
- Original-style N64 gate for the joystick
- D-pad, A/B buttons, and C-buttons retaining original size and sub-layouts
- Turbo function
- Vibration support
- Bluetooth 5.0 and USB-C connectivity
- Compatibility with Analogue 3D, Nintendo Switch, Android, and Windows

The controller is priced at $39.99 and is sold separately.

== Compatibility ==
=== Flash cart compatibility ===
At launch, some flash cartridge compatibility issues were reported, particularly with EverDrive X5 and X7 models. EverDrive creator Krikzz released firmware OS-V3.09 and subsequently V3.10 to address these issues, though updating requires access to an original N64 console to install a new bootloader. Some older EverDrive models work without modification.

=== openFPGA support ===
Unlike the Analogue Pocket, the Analogue 3D does not support openFPGA, Analogue's framework that allows third-party developers to create FPGA cores for other systems. This means the console can only play N64 games and cannot be expanded to play games from other consoles through community-developed cores.

== Reception ==
The Analogue 3D received favorable reviews from critics. In November 2025, various reviewers received a review kit consisting of an Analogue 3D console and matching 8BitDo 64 controller.

Writing for IGN, Seth G. Macy gave the console an 8/10, praising its refined industrial design, display flexibility, and filter options, calling it "the best possible way to play your N64 library outside of the original hardware hooked up to a CRT." The review criticized the interlaced video "combing" issue visible in certain games when using the clean display mode. Matt Kamen of Wired awarded the console a 9/10, praising its ability to perfectly handle any original N64 game, original accessory support, broad controller compatibility, and elegant physical design. However, he criticised the system-level functionality for being lacking and the omission of bundled controllers. Digital Foundry described the Analogue 3D as "the most impressive Analogue 'FPGA' console yet," highlighting the overclocking features and CRT filter implementation as particularly noteworthy. The review noted that the console "over-delivers beyond what its initial advertising promised."

Damien McFerran of Time Extension awarded the console 9/10, calling it "the ultimate way to play Nintendo 64" and praising the FPGA technology, image quality, and HDR support. Eurogamer reviewer Alex Donaldson described it as "another best-in-class retro experience" in their positive review.

== See also ==
- Analogue Pocket
- Analogue Nt
- Analogue Super Nt
- Nintendo 64
- Field-programmable gate array
