= Olof Gustafsson =

Swedish video game composer and sound designer

- Other name: Blaizer
- Occupations: Video game composer, sound designer, video game developer
- Known for: Co-founding Digital Illusions

Olof Gustafsson is a Swedish video game composer and sound designer who was one of the founders of Digital Illusions, later known as DICE. He composed the music for Pinball Dreams, Pinball Fantasies and Pinball Illusions.

== Career ==
=== Demoscene and DICE ===
Gustafsson began making computer music in the Amiga demoscene under the name Blaizer and was a member of the Swedish demo group The Silents in the late 1980s. He and several other members of The Silents later moved into commercial game development, creating Pinball Dreams and founding Digital Illusions in May 1992. Pinball Dreams was released for the Amiga in 1992, with music by Gustafsson. He continued as composer on Pinball Fantasies, released later that year, and Pinball Illusions in 1995.

During the 1990s and early 2000s, Gustafsson continued to work in music and audio at Digital Illusions. In a 2004 interview, he described his role at DICE as a sound engineer responsible for music and sound effects. His later work included additional sound for Battlefield 1942 and serving as audio lead, composer and gameplay designer on Midtown Madness 3.

=== Later career ===
Gustafsson left DICE in 2005 and co-founded EPOS Game Studios later that year. EPOS developed Crash Commando for the PlayStation 3, for which he created the original concept, music and sound effects.

In 2024, Gustafsson worked on the sound package for Pinball Brothers' ABBA pinball machine. He composed and performed additional music for the company's Predator machine, released in 2025.

== Selected video game music ==
The following is a selection of Gustafsson's video game music credits.

Year	Title	Role
1992	Pinball Dreams	Music and sound effects
1992	Pinball Fantasies	Music and sound effects
1994	Benefactor	Music
1995	Pinball Illusions	Music and sound effects
1996	True Pinball	Music and sound effects
1998	Motorhead	Music and sound
2000	Michelin Rally Masters: Race of Champions	Music and sound effects
2002	Shrek: Extra Large	Music and sound effects
2003	Midtown Madness 3	Composer
2008	Crash Commando	Music and sound effects
2015	Guns Up!	Music and sound effects
2019	Ultracore	Music and sound effects

== Selected discography ==
Year	Album	Contribution
2000	Merregnon Soundtrack Volume 1	"Burning Lascest" and "Meeting for the Hunt" – composer
2004	Merregnon Soundtrack Volume 2	"Answers Unearthed" and "Grand Finale" – composer
2006	Immortal 3	Pinball Dreams and Pinball Fantasies – composer and arranger
2011	Immortal 4	Benefactor – composer and arranger
2020	Amiga Power: The Album With Attitude	Pinball Fantasies: Party Land – composer and arranger
