= Kevin Horton =

Electrical engineer (born 1973 or 1974)

- Born: 1973 or 1974 (age 52–53)
- Other name: Kevtris
- Occupation: Electrical engineer
- Known for: Analogue Nt Mini, Super Nt, Mega Sg

Kevin "Kevtris" Horton is an American electrical engineer known for his work with Analogue on the Analogue Nt Mini, Super Nt and Mega Sg.

== Early work ==
Before working full-time for Analogue, Horton worked in cryogenics and developed video-game hardware in his spare time.

In 1996, he released Kevtris, a Tetris-like game for the ColecoVision. He produced 100 cartridges, and the game's name became his online handle.

In the late 1990s, Horton built HardNES, a hardware player for music from Nintendo Entertainment System games. It combined a NES processor with a field-programmable gate array (FPGA) and other components. For the project, he developed the Nintendo Entertainment System Music (NESM) file format, also known as NES Sound Format (NSF), which packaged a game's sound data and sound engine with a header.

== Analogue ==
Horton developed Hi-Def NES, an HDMI modification for the Nintendo Entertainment System, and adapted the design for the Analogue Nt. Unlike the original Nt, which used Nintendo chips, the Analogue Nt Mini recreated the NES hardware in an FPGA. Horton developed its FPGA implementation and joined Analogue as a full-time hardware and software developer.

In 2017, Motherboard included Horton in its "Humans of the Year" series for his work on the Nt Mini.

Horton subsequently developed the FPGA implementation of the Super Nintendo Entertainment System used in Analogue's Super Nt. During development, he compared the FPGA implementation with original SNES chips using custom test hardware. He also developed FPGA cores for the Mega Sg, Analogue's recreation of the Sega Genesis.

Analogue identifies Horton as its director of FPGA development. Its Duo FAQ describes the company's FPGA cores as developed or directed by Horton together with its engineering team.

== Other contributions ==
The release notes for MAME 0.183 credit Horton among the contributors to support for the electronic games GAF Melody Madness, Lakeside Le Boom and Ideal Maniac.
