= S40 Racing =

Freeware PC game

- Developer: Digital Illusions CE
- Composer: Olof Gustafsson
- Platform: PC
- Release: WW: October 1997
- Genre: Racing

Gameplay screenshot

S40 Racing is a freeware game developed by Digital Illusions CE (DICE) and released in October 1997 for the personal computer. The game was made as part of the promotion for the S40 and was shown at a number of large car exhibitions and motor shows in 1997. It has one selectable car and two tracks on which to race, one of which is the Nolby Hills racetrack.

It is based on the same software code as Motorhead (1998). The entire game was completed in fewer than 45 days and sold 16,000 copies through Volvo dealerships throughout Sweden.
