= Ultracore =

2019 video game

- Developers: DICE; Strictly Limited Games
- Publishers: Strictly Limited Games; Columbus Circle (Genesis)
- Producer: Greg Duddle
- Designers: Joakim Wejdemar; Bo Lankinen; Olof Gustafsson; Frederik Liliegren; Markus Nystroem
- Programmer: Bo Lankinen
- Artists: Joakim Wejdemar; Markus Nystroem
- Composer: Olof Gustafsson
- Platforms: Mega Sg; Switch; PlayStation 4; Vita; Genesis; Xbox One; Xbox Series X/S
- Release: Mega Sg: WW: March 25, 2019; Genesis/Mega Drive: JP: October 17, 2019; Switch, PS4: WW: June 23, 2020; PlayStation Vita: NA: July 21, 2020; EU: July 24, 2020; Xbox One, Series X/S: WW: December 7, 2023
- Genre: Run and gun
- Mode: Single-player

Ultracore (originally known as Hardcore) is a run and gun video game developed by DICE. Originally due to be released for Amiga, Genesis, and Sega CD platforms, the game was canceled by its publisher, Psygnosis, in 1994 after it had been almost finished. The game was salvaged by publisher Strictly Limited Games and released together with the Mega Sg aftermarket console in March 2019. A version compatible with original Sega Genesis systems was released in Japan in October 2019. Ports for Nintendo Switch, PlayStation 4, and PlayStation Vita were released in 2020; ports for Xbox One and Xbox Series X/S were released in December 2023.

== Gameplay ==
Ultracore is a run and gun game. The player collects weapon power-ups while moving through levels.

== Development ==
Digital Illusions initially developed Hardcore for Amiga, Genesis, and Sega CD platforms. Despite being "about 99 percent finished", the game's publisher, Psygnosis, ultimately canceled the game in 1994. With the then-upcoming release of the 32-bit PlayStation console, Psygnosis expected sales for 16-bit Sega Genesis games, including Hardcore, to wane. A few videos of its gameplay also leaked over the years. Andreas Axelsson and Olof Gustafsson, two of DICE's founders, presented a demo of the game at the 2010 Datastorm exposition for Commodore enthusiast.

In August 2018, German publisher Strictly Limited Games announced plans to finish and release the game. The company's team of nine people, including DICE co-founder Fredrik Liljegren and other former DICE employees, used an original Sega Genesis development kit to finish the game's production, porting the game to PlayStation 4 and PlayStation Vita, two modern systems, afterwards. At the time, Sony, the makers of the PlayStation, owned the Psygnosis back-catalog. Strictly Limited Games also attempted to add tank levels that were missing from the game with input from its original designers. Prior to release, Hardcore was retitled Ultracore due to licensing issues. Ultracore was first released as part of the Mega Sg, an aftermarket console for Sega Genesis games developed by Analogue, on March 25, 2019. Ultracore was released for PlayStation 4 and Nintendo Switch on June 23, 2020, with a PlayStation Vita version releasing at a later date. A physical version compatible with original Sega Genesis systems was also planned. In Japan, this version was released by Columbus Circle on 17 October 2019. The game was released for Xbox One and Xbox Series X/S on 7 December 2023.
