= Pinball Mania =

- front of box of Amiga version
- Developer: Spidersoft
- Publishers: 21st Century Entertainment (Amiga and PC versions); GameTek (Game Boy version)
- Platforms: Amiga; MS-DOS; Windows; Game Boy
- Release: 1995
- Genre: Pinball

Pinball Mania is a 1995 video game developed by Spidersoft and published by 21st Century Entertainment. In addition to the Amiga release, ports were created for MS-DOS and Windows, with the Game Boy version published by GameTek.

== Gameplay ==
The player controls a silver pinball across four themed scrolling pinball tables, using flippers to keep the ball in play while aiming for targets, ramps, bumpers, and scoring features. Each table has its own layout and objectives, including football-themed, spider-themed, prison-themed, and casino-themed elements, and gameplay focuses on maintaining the ball in play and accumulating points by striking the various table features. All tables include at least four flippers. Options are included to adjust the number of balls (to three or five), and the angle of the tables.

== Release ==
part of "Tarantula" table in Amiga version

The game was included as a pack-in title in the "Amiga Magic" A1200 package, released September 1995. An Amiga A1200 or better was required to run this version of the game.

Two PC ports were released, one for pure MS-DOS, and one for Windows which only runs under Windows 95. Additional resolution options were added to the Windows version.

The version for the Game Boy was published by GameTek.

== Reception ==
Reception (Amiga)

Review scores
Publication	Score
Amiga Dream	72%
Amiga Games	68%
Amiga Magazine	5/10
Amiga Joker	86%
CU Amiga	75%
Evening Chronicle	85%
Liverpool Echo	4/5
The One	74%

The One called the game better than Obsession, but less polished than earlier 21st Century Entertainment pinball games. The layout of the tables was praised, but found them relatively primitive when compared to arcade pinball machines. It was found to be too easy to keep balls in play.

CU Amiga declared it to be an average game, criticizing "limp" and "erratic" flippers making it hard to reach the top of tables. The lack of playfield features was disappointing. The music was praised, but some sound effects were absent.

Amiga Dream criticized the options menu, and that Workbench was displayed when a disk swap was required. The ball movement was called bizarre. Only the "Tarantula" and "Jackpot" were found worth playing, and the graphics engine worse than preceding games.

Amiga Games recommended games such as Pinball Dreams instead. The display was noted to mostly include only "dull" scores and speech almost non-existant. The ball physics were called unrealistic with precise shots rarely possible.

Amiga Magazine criticized the game, stating it did not belong in the A1200 "Amiga Magic" bundle, calling the game subpar with a lack of creativity.

Evening Chronicle liked the music and sound effects in Pinball Mania. Liverpool Echo called Pinball Mania a well designed game with a number of extra features.

Reception (other platforms)

Review scores
Publication	Score
Consoles +	GB: 80%
PC Games (DE)	PC: 69%
Total!	GB: 56%
Pelit	MS-DOS: 72%, Windows: 50%
Software Gids	MS-DOS: 38/50

Reviewing the PC version, PC Games called the game a no frills pinball experience, recommending players to choose Pyscho Pinball instead. Software Gids encountered technical difficulties with the Windows version. They only recommended the DOS version to those without a CD-ROM drive due to the same tables also being released in a compilation with the tables from Pinball Fantasies. Pelit found the ball movement and collisions to be realistic with the tables extremely colorful.

Total! found the Game Boy version to be below average with bland tables. The sound was criticized and the ball moved sluggishly. Consoles+ found the animation to be fluid, but the ball to lack speed. The graphics were called sparse and although the game was called decent its long-term appeal was limited.

== Legacy ==
The four tables from this game were reused in the 1996 game Total Pinball 3D (also known as Pinball 3D-VCR), and three further games.
