= Obsession (video game) =

1994 video game

- Original Atari STe cover art
- Developer: Unique Development Sweden
- Publisher: Unique Development Sweden
- Designers: Peter Zetterberg; Magnus Zetterburg (uncredited)
- Programmers: Hans Härröd; Kalle Lundqvist; Michael Brunnström; Tord Jansson
- Artist: Jimmy Gustafsson
- Composer: Per Almered
- Platforms: Amiga, Atari STe
- Release: Atari STe: EU: December 2, 1994; Amiga: EU: June 1, 1995
- Genre: Pinball
- Modes: Single-player, multiplayer

Obsession is a pinball video game developed and originally published by Unique Development Sweden for the Atari STe on December 2, 1994. It was the first video game created by UDS and one of the last official releases for the Atari ST line after being discontinued in 1993 by Atari Corporation. An Amiga conversion was released on June 1, 1995. Players can choose from four pinball tables which have their own themes and objectives to obtain the highest score possible.

Obsession was the debut title of Unique Development Sweden, a development company consisting of Atari ST demosceners, composers and artists founded in 1992 by Peter Zetterberg and Michael Brunnström, both of which began writing games for the Atari STe and found the idea of earning money from their hobby as appealing. The original idea was to develop a shareware game inspired by Pinball Dreams for the STe at the level of an earlier release by Zetterberg before the project was expanded upon, as UDS settled with developing a pinball project with a "no compromise" approach due to the lack of quality pinball titles on the ST but its scope grew too much during development and the team struggled to get the title working and ship it on schedule.

The Atari STe version of Obsession received praise from critics for pushing limits of the STe hardware, audiovisual presentation, controls, and gameplay, but criticized for various design aspects such as lack of multiball, and sold very few copies. The Amiga version was commended by reviewers but received criticism for certain aspects compared to the STe original while others drew comparison with both the Pinball series by Digital Illusions and 21st Century Entertainment, as well as Dragon's Fury. Ports to the for the Amiga 1200, Atari Falcon, MS-DOS, and Jaguar were under development but never released. The MS-DOS version evolved into a follow-up with new tables and features titled Absolute Pinball (1996).

== Gameplay ==
Atari STe version screenshot

Obsession is an arcade-style pinball game for one or eight players reminiscent of the Pinball game series by Digital Illusions and 21st Century Entertainment, featuring four types of pinball tables and each one has their own main objectives, gameplay mechanics and thematic. The player can set a number of settings in the options menu or during gameplay by pressing key commands on the computer.

"Aquatic Adventure", a table included in the April 1994 covermount of ST Review magazine, is oriented around Bobby Bubble searching for a treasure using a map stolen from Captain Notpolite. "X-ile Zone" is focused on an assassination mission against an enemy tribe leader taking place in a post-nuclear war setting. "Balls 'n Bats" is a baseball-style table where players attempt to win a world series. "Desert Run" is based on racing, where players start from Paris and reach Dakar. Each table has their respective letters that must be lit to start a high-scoring event.

== Development ==
Obsession was the first project to be developed by Unique Development Sweden (now Unique Development Studios), a Swedish video game developer consisting of Atari ST demosceners, composers and artists founded in 1992 by Peter Zetterberg and Michael Brunnström, both of which began writing games for the STe and found the idea of earning money from their hobby as appealing. Its development was helmed by a crew of approximately seven to eight members with Zetterberg as both project manager and designer along with Magnus Zetterburg. Brunnström also served as programmer alongside Kalle Lundqvist, Hans Härröd and Tord Jansson, who acted as sound programmer and wrote the replay routines. Jimmy Gustafsson was responsible for the table artwork, while the soundtrack was composed by Per Almered. The team recounted its creation process and history through various publications.

The team stated that the original idea behind Obsession was to develop a simple shareware pinball game inspired by Pinball Dreams for the STe at the level of an earlier release by Zetterberg titled Smash Hit, starting early design work before the project was expanded upon. Jansson was brought to the team due to his proprietary sound driver called "Octalyser" but also suggested bringing Almered to compose music and Härröd to use his routines for border breaking and raster colors. Gustafsson was later brought in after the staff realized they needed improved visuals. Because of the lack of quality pinball games on the ST besides Starball, the team settled with developing a pinball project with a "no compromise" approach for the STe as both Zetterberg and Brunnström had previously discussed creating a game that made use of the hardware features in the STe computer, while Jansson stated they did not wanted to make a "bad copy" of Pinball Dreams.

Gustafsson drew each table using four layers instead of using one layer to save time and avoid redesigning tables when minor changes were required. Almered composed the music under general guidelines provided by Zetterberg using the Octalyser sound driver to set the mood for each table, while sampling instruments from sample CDs and multiple synthesizers. Zetterberg told Almered that he wanted to reflect a post-war scenario when composing music for the "X-ile Zone" table. Lundqvist coded the ball routine but proved difficult and took a year for him to program the routine. Despite receiving governmental startup support, however, Jansson stated that the scope of Obsession had grown too much during development and the team struggled to get the game working and ship it in time.

== Release ==
Obsession was first showcased in a playable state at the 1994 Bristol Atari Show and initially slated for an October 1994 launch. The game was first released by Unique Development Sweden for the Atari STe on December 2, 1994. It was also distributed in France by Frontier Software. The title was later ported to the Amiga by UDS and released on June 1, 1995. A conversion for the Amiga 1200 featuring a new table and a multiball mechanic was planned but never released. According to Tord Jansson in a 2018 interview, work on Atari Falcon and PC port began after the release of the Amiga version but the latter version evolved into a new project with new tables and features titled Absolute Pinball, while the rights to the unreleased Falcon version were sold to a French company. Jansson also stated that Atari Corporation gave the team an Atari Jaguar development kit which he and Ulrik Lindahl, another programmer at Unique Development Sweden spent time with it and created a conversion of Obsession with only three out of the four tables to the Jaguar in a few days except the music and sound effects. However, UDS decided not to support the system due to its low sales and sent back the development kit to Atari Corp.

== Reception ==
Reception

Review scores
Publication	Score
Amiga Action	(AGA) 86%
Amiga Computing	(AGA) 87%
Amiga Format	(AGA) 74%
Amiga Power	(AGA) 78%
ST Format	(ST) 94%
ST Review	(ST) 98%
Amiga Concept	(AGA) 73%
Amiga Dream	(AGA) 90%
Amiga Games	(AGA) 72%
Amiga Joker	(AGA) 78%
Atari Inside	(ST) 94%
Datormagazin	(AGA) 2/5
The One for Amiga Games	(AGA) 72%
STart Micro	(ST) 98%

Obsession garnered critical acclaim from reviewers when it was released on the Atari STe. ST Review's Tina Hackett praised the visual presentation of each table for pushing the limits of the STe hardware, sound, controls and addictive gameplay but criticized the lack of a multiball system and a double set of flippers on the tables. German magazine Atari Inside commended Unique Development Sweden for creating a "great" pinball simulator, praising the ball and table physics as well as the overall audiovisual presentation. ST Format's Trenton Webb also commended Unique Development for making use of the STe hardware, praising the physics, graphics, sound, speed and accessibility, regarding it as one of the best games for the computer alongside Zero-5 but criticized the "Ball & Bats" table for being dull and relying heavily on its main gimmick. STart Micro's Arnaud Pignard gave positive remarks to the colorful graphics, playability and soundtrack as well. Despite having positive reviews, Tord Jansson stated that very few copies were sold due to its late release on the STe.

Obsession was also met with mostly positive critical reception when it was ported to the Amiga but many drew comparison with the Pinball game series by Digital Illusions and Dragon's Fury. Amiga Power's Jonathan Nash commended the variety of tables but criticized the "Exile Zone" table in particular for its overall design and ball physics in the Amiga conversion. Amiga Format's Stephen Bradley stated that the Amiga version was not as slick as the Pinball games by Digital Illusions and criticized the occasionally sluggish playability but ultimately regarded it as a fine game, praising the audiovisual presentation as well as the "Desert Run" and "Ball 'n' Bats" tables for being addictive. Amiga Action's Steve McNally and Paul Roundell drew comparison with Digital Illusions' Pinball releases but nevertheless stated that "Obsession is a fine example of what the Amiga is capable of", giving positive remarks to the graphics, sound, playability and difficulty.

Both Amiga Concept's Sébastian Mézière and Amiga Dream's Yann Sera commended the Amiga version of Obsession for its animated visuals, audio design, longevity and difficulty. When reviewing the Amiga version for Amiga Computing and comparing it to Digital Illusions' Pinball titles, Hackett stated that the port was let down by the lack of a multiball mechanic and a double set of flippers, regarding the music to be not as good as the STe original but gave positive comments to the graphical presentation for being impressive, ball physics and multiplayer.
