= Mega Sg =

Home video game console by Analogue

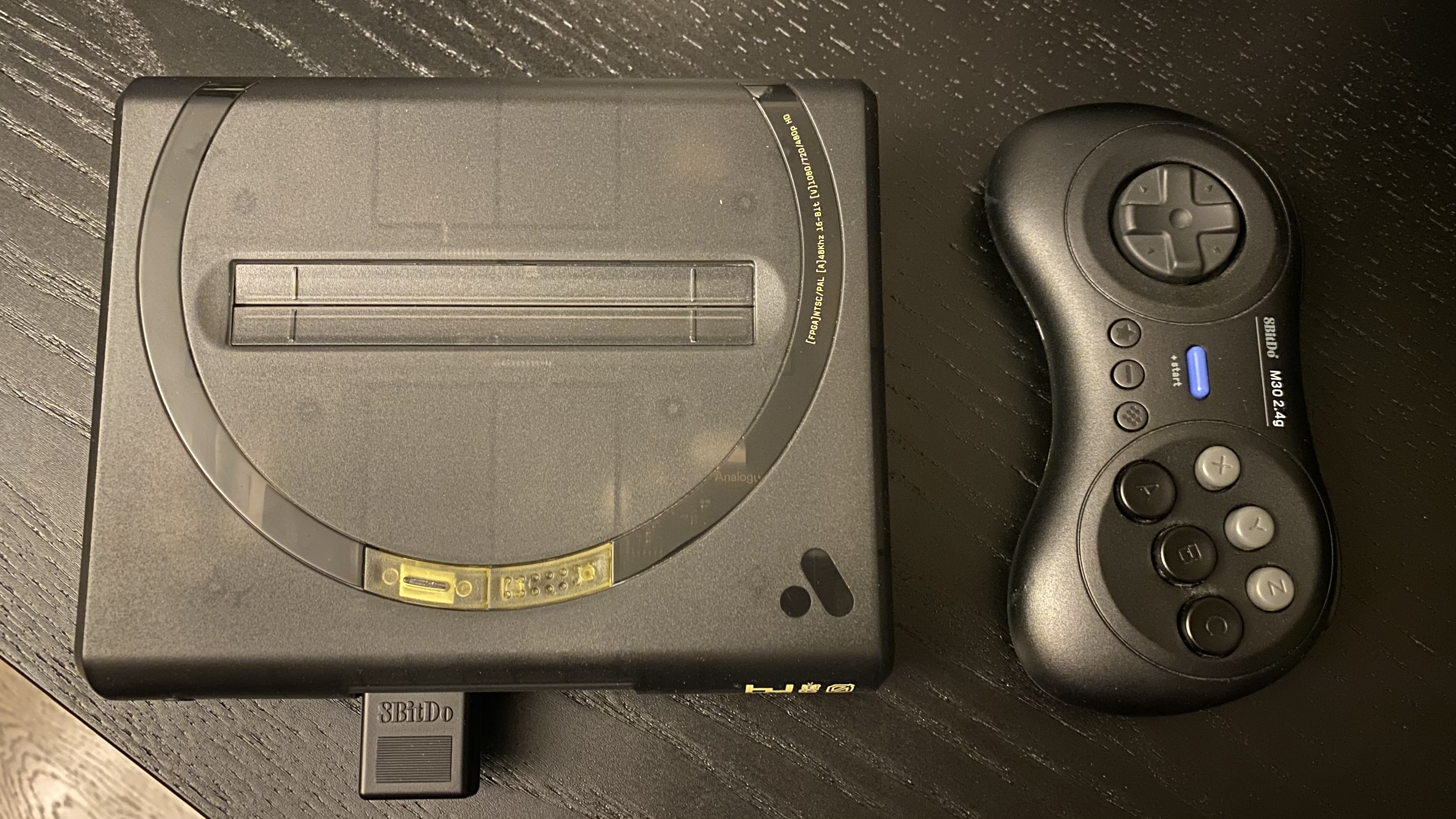
- Manufacturer: Analogue
- Type: Home video game console
- Released: March 25, 2019
- Lifespan: 2019 - 2022
- Introductory price: $190
- Media: Game cartridges, Game cards, SD card
- CPU: Altera Cyclone V
- Display: HDMI (1080p, 720p, 480p) at 50/60 Hz
- Sound: 48kHz, 16-bit, digital over HDMI
- Connectivity: Sega Genesis & Sega Mega Drive style controller ports (2), HDMI output, Micro USB input (power only)
- Website: www.analogue.co/mega-sg/

The Mega Sg is a home video game console manufactured by Analogue, released in 2019. It runs games developed for the Sega Genesis, Master System, Game Gear and SG-1000, systems released by Sega in the 1980s and early 1990s during the fourth generation of consoles. Rather than use software emulation the Mega Sg uses FPGA chips to reimplement the original machine's behaviour. The Mega Sg was discontinued alongside the Super Nt in 2022.

== Features ==
The Mega Sg features 1080p HDMI, digital audio (48 kHz 16-bit), and original Genesis-style controller ports. Kevin Horton engineered Mega Sg to use an Altera Cyclone V to match the Genesis hardware logic with very high accuracy and also provided extra features, such as the option to scale the original 240p video output to different resolutions up to 1080p 60 Hz. Phil Fish, the designer of Fez, designed the user interface, and Arca composed the startup audio. It includes an unreleased Genesis game from 1994, Hardcore, renamed Ultracore due to licensing problems.

== Limited edition ==
Konsolation cover art

Record label Hyperdub collaborated with Analogue on a limited edition Mega Sg with a Sega Genesis music cartridge called Konsolation featuring unreleased music from artists such as Burial, Scratcha DVA, and Ikonika. Konsolation was created in an edition of 1,000 units as part of Hyperdub's 15th anniversary celebration.

=== Track listing ===
| No. | Title | Artist | Length |
|---|---|---|---|
| 1. | "Starlore" | Burial | 6:58 |
| 2. | "Mega Wasp" | Scratcha DVA | 3:29 |
| 3. | "Git Gud" | Ikonika | 2:31 |
| 4. | "Bobby" | Jessy Lanza & Jeremy Greenspan | 4:30 |
| 5. | "Flakier Whelk" | Proc Fiskal | 4:06 |
| 6. | "Segatrack" | Lee Gamble | 2:16 |
| 7. | "Altered Interzone" | Mana | 3:25 |
| 8. | "Check Check" | Cooly G | 2:42 |
| 9. | "Yula" | Nazar | 2:05 |
| 10. | "FF" | DJ Taye | 2:18 |
| 11. | "Spiral Unlock" | Kode9 | 2:12 |

== Reception ==
The Guardian gave the Mega Sg four out of five, writing: "Playing Streets of Rage 2 or Comix Zone on this thing is like experiencing a remastered recording of a favourite album, or a digitally restored version of a classic movie ... the Mega Sg makes Sonic and all the other games I have tried feel fresh and contemporary."

The Mega Sg was named the Time best inventions of 2019 award, an Editor's Choice Award from Wired, an Editor's Choice Award from Tom's Guide, an Editor's Choice Award from IGN and an Editor's Choice Award from PCMag.

Engadget gave the console an 86/100, with one of the only complaints being a lack of 32X compatibility.
