= Red Jade =

Video game console

- Developer: Red Jade
- Manufacturer: Ericsson
- Type: Handheld game console
- Generation: Sixth generation of video game consoles
- Released: ~2002 (planned)
- Lifespan: Cancelled
- Introductory price: Between $100 and $300
- Discontinued: April 2001
- Media: Digital distribution
- CPU: 32-bit or 64-bit MIPS architecture processor
- Display: Reflective TFT (non-backlit)
- Graphics: Custom chipset
- Sound: Stereo
- Connectivity: Bluetooth; 900 MHz or 2.4 GHz wireless Cellular (optional)
- Power: Integrated rechargeable battery
- Website: Redjade.com (Archived)

The Red Jade was Ericsson's unreleased handheld console, intended to compete with the Game Boy Advance.

== History ==
=== Development ===
Fredrik Liljegren founded Red Jade as a startup company in February 2000. The startup included other notable developers such as RJ Mical. Originally the developing team for the Red Jade approached Sony and Sega as potential partners but both declined. Ericsson decided to invest US$10 million in the Red Jade, It was to be released by Christmas season 2002 and would have retailed for $150.

=== Cancellation ===
When overall sales plummeted, Ericsson cancelled the Red Jade before production in April 2001 and cut 22,000 employees to help minimize losses. The collapse of the Dot-com bubble left the startup in a position where it was unable to find other investors to continue development. The number of existing prototype units is unclear along with possibility of games made for them. Quake III Arena was said to have received a port. Ericsson's mobile phone division later divested into joint venture with Sony and rebranded as Sony Ericsson, until Sony acquired Ericsson's share and became Sony Mobile Communications. In 2006 Red Jade as a company would be restarted by Liliegreen to operate as a game development studio.

== Specifications ==
The Red Jade which was supposed to have PDA functions, wireless connectivity, DivX movies, cell phone capabilities, a GPS server, MP3 audio playback, a web browser, the ability to download games from the website, game sharing utilizing Bluetooth technology, and graphics equivalent to the PlayStation or Nintendo 64.

The system used a 32-bit or 64-bit MIPS architecture processor 3D polygon graphics were said to possibly be handled by an NVIDIA chipset. Graphics were displayed on a TFT LCD that supported 65536 colors. The system used multi-channel PCM audio. Bluetooth technology enabled wireless communication between 2 or more machines. The system was powered by a Lithium-ion battery.
