= Analogue (video game company) =

Video game hardware company

Analogue, Inc.
- Type: Private
- Industry: Video game hardware; Consumer electronics
- Founded: 2011; 15 years ago
- Founder: Christopher Taber
- Area served: Worldwide
- Key people: Christopher Taber (CEO); Ernest Dorazio III; Marshall Hecht; Kevin Horton (Director of FPGA Development)
- Website: www.analogue.co

Analogue, Inc. is a company that develops and sells video game hardware. Its hardware products include the Analogue Pocket, Analogue Mega Sg, Analogue Super Nt, Analogue Nt Mini, Analogue Nt, Analogue Duo and Analogue 3D. Founded by Christopher Taber in 2011, the company initially adapted original console and arcade components for new systems, before developing consoles based on field-programmable gate arrays (FPGAs).

== History ==
=== Founding and early products ===
Analogue was founded in 2011 by Christopher Taber. In a 2018 interview, Taber traced the business to collecting, reselling and repairing older games and consoles while attending college in Montana. He said that proceeds from this work helped finance the company's first Neo Geo product.

Operating under the name Analogue Interactive, the company released the Analogue CMVS in 2011. The system adapted an original SNK Neo Geo MVS arcade motherboard for home use and enclosed it in walnut. A revised CMVS Slim and a matching wooden arcade stick followed that year.

The Analogue Nt began shipping in June 2015. It played Nintendo Entertainment System and Famicom cartridges and used an aluminium enclosure. Unlike the later Nt mini, the original Nt used Nintendo CPU and picture-processing chips recovered from Famicom consoles.

In 2016, Analogue collaborated with 8BitDo on the Retro Receiver, a Bluetooth receiver for connecting wireless controllers to the NES, followed by a version for the SNES.

=== FPGA hardware and later systems ===
Analogue hired engineer Kevin Horton, known as kevtris, full-time and developed hardware that did not depend on a supply of original console chips. The FPGA-based Nt mini began shipping in January 2017. The Super Nt, compatible with Super Nintendo and Super Famicom cartridges, followed in 2018. Its plastic enclosure and approximately US$190 launch price marked a departure from the company's more expensive wood- and aluminium-cased systems. The Sega-compatible Mega Sg was released in 2019.

Analogue announced the Pocket handheld in October 2019, initially targeting a 2020 release. It launched in December 2021, with support for Game Boy, Game Boy Color and Game Boy Advance cartridges. A separately sold Game Gear cartridge adapter was also available at launch. In July 2022, the company introduced openFPGA through a Pocket operating-system update, allowing third-party developers to distribute additional FPGA cores. The launch included a third-party implementation of the PDP-1 computer for playing Spacewar!.

The Duo, which supports the PC Engine and TurboGrafx-16 families and their CD-based games, was released in December 2023.

On 1 March 2024, Pocket firmware version 2.2 added support for the separately sold Pocket Adapter Set, covering Neo Geo Pocket and Neo Geo Pocket Color, Atari Lynx, and TurboGrafx-16/PC Engine/SuperGrafx cartridges.

The Nintendo 64-compatible Analogue 3D followed in November 2025 after several delays. Analogue worked with 8BitDo on the 64 Controller, a wireless controller designed for the 3D and sold separately.

In October 2022, Analogue announced final production runs of the original Super Nt and Mega Sg. On 16 October 2026, it announced revised models, the Super Nt+ and Mega Sg+. The announced changes included built-in wireless-controller connectivity and revised enclosures and connections. As of November 2026, the company listed both for shipment in December 2026.

=== Personnel and design ===
Christopher Taber is Analogue's founder and chief executive officer. Taber has also served as chief marketing officer of 8BitDo.

Kevin Horton developed FPGA implementations for its consoles; Analogue identifies him as director of FPGA development and describes FPGA work that he performs or directs with an engineering team.

In 2015, Taber identified Ernest Dorazio as lead designer and credited him with hand-routing the Nt circuit board. A 2023 equipment-authorisation filing for the Duo listed Dorazio as director of manufacturing and programs. The 2022 Red Dot award record for Pocket credits Taber, Dorazio and Marshall Hecht as its in-house design team. Reporting on the Analogue 3D in November 2025 identified Hecht as the company's lead hardware engineer.

Analogue has also worked with game designers and musicians. Phil Fish designed the Super Nt's menu interface and startup animation, with startup audio by Squarepusher.

=== Corporate presence ===
Analogue was described as Seattle-based in contemporary reporting, including coverage of the Nt in 2014. In 2020, Design Milk described its newly opened Causeway Bay office in Hong Kong as its Asia headquarters. The office's architect, JJ Acuna, said that Taber had established a presence in Hong Kong to be closer to production in China; the office fit-out was completed in December 2019.

The company's website terms name Analogue Enterprises Limited as the contracting entity and give a Hong Kong address. A Hong Kong Companies Registry report lists that entity with an incorporation or registration date of 26 September 2016. Analogue's privacy policy also lists a Seattle postal contact.

== Products ==
Products and cartridge formats supported as of November 2026
Product	Compatible console formats	First release
Analogue CMVS	Neo Geo MVS arcade cartridges	2011
Analogue Arcade Stick	Neo Geo controller accessory; not a console	2011
Analogue Nt	Nintendo Entertainment System and Famicom cartridges	2015
Analogue Nt Mini	Nintendo Entertainment System and Famicom cartridges	2017
Analogue Super Nt	Super Nintendo Entertainment System and Super Famicom cartridges	2018
Analogue Mega Sg	Sega Genesis/Mega Drive; Master System through the included adapter; Game Gear, Mark III, SG-1000 and Sega MyCard through additional adapters	2019
Analogue Pocket	Without adapters: Game Boy, Game Boy Color and Game Boy Advance cartridges. With separately sold cartridge adapters: Game Gear, Neo Geo Pocket and Neo Geo Pocket Color, Atari Lynx, and TurboGrafx-16/PC Engine/SuperGrafx HuCards. The Game Gear adapter was available at launch; firmware support for the other adapters was added in March 2024.	2021
Analogue Duo	TurboGrafx-16, PC Engine and SuperGrafx HuCards; TurboGrafx-CD, CD-ROM², Super CD-ROM² and Arcade CD-ROM² discs	2023
Analogue 3D	Nintendo 64 cartridges	2025

The Mega Sg can connect to original Sega CD or Mega-CD hardware; it does not contain a CD drive. Pocket's optional Dock provides television output and support for external controllers. Separately, Pocket supports additional systems through third-party openFPGA cores. These are distributed as files for a microSD card and can load assets from the card.

=== Announced products ===
Product	Announced compatibility	Scheduled shipment as of November 2026
Super Nt+	Super Nintendo Entertainment System and Super Famicom cartridges	December 2026
Mega Sg+	Sega Genesis/Mega Drive and Master System, with adapters for additional Sega formats	December 2026

== Reception ==
Analogue's work has received positive coverage for its focus on video game preservation. Scott Meslow of GQ discussed the Nt mini as a way to retain access to the NES and Famicom libraries, while Bijan Stephen of The Verge placed the company's cartridge-compatible systems in the context of preserving the experience of older hardware.

Reviews have also addressed the systems' cost and limitations. Kyle Orland of Ars Technica praised the original Nt's construction and presentation but described its price as a barrier for all but dedicated enthusiasts. In 2018, Peter Brown of GameSpot praised the Super Nt's video output and configuration options while reporting a small number of compatibility problems during testing; Analogue fixed one reported issue before publication. In a November 2025 review, Damien McFerran of Time Extension praised the 3D's image quality and performance options, while noting its repeated delays and interface limitations.

Fast Company included Analogue in its list of the ten most innovative consumer electronics companies of 2022, recognising the Pocket. Pocket received a Red Dot Product Design award in 2022 and was a CES 2021 Innovation Awards honoree in the Gaming category. It was also shortlisted for the 2020 Life-Enhancer of the Year award by Wallpaper.

Time included the Mega Sg in its Best Inventions list in November 2019 and included the Analogue 3D in its Best Inventions list in October 2026.
