= Fredrik Liljegren =

Swedish programmer

- Born: December 5, 1969 (age 56); Lund
- Known for: having founded DICE

Fredrik Liljegren, also known as Fredrik Liliegren, is a Swedish programmer and businessman. He has worked at RedJade and co-founded the studio Digital Illusions and the demogroup The Silents.

== Early life and education ==
Liliegren was born in Lund to Lars-Göran Liljegren and Lena Bramsbo. As a junior high and high school student in Växjö, he spent a lot of time creating graphics and demo games. He studied computer science at Växjö University, now known as Linnaeus University, in Sweden, but never graduated.

== Career ==
While studying at Linnaeus, in 1992 Liljegren and fellow demo scene developers Ulf Mandorff, Olof Gustafsson, Andreas Axelsson and Markus Nystrom, members of the former demogroup The Silents—for which Liljegren acted as a spokesperson—founded the computer game company DICE and developed pinball computer games for Amiga. The first game was Pinball Dreams, which they started developing in 1988 and sold in 1992. Liljergen was a founder of Red Jade.
