= Paladin (video game) =

1988 video game

- Publisher: Omnitrend Software
- Platforms: Amiga, Atari ST, MS-DOS
- Release: 1988

Paladin is a 1988 video game published by Omnitrend Software.

== Gameplay ==
Paladin is a game in which the player character is a paladin, a leader of a small fantasy combat unit.

== Reception ==
Jasper Sylvester reviewed the game for Computer Gaming World, and stated that "In short, those who liked the "feel" of play in Breach, but prefer a fantasy environment shouldn't miss Paladin."
