= Pinball Fantasies =

1992 video game

- Developer: Digital Illusions: FrontLine Design (MS-DOS) Spidersoft (Game Boy/Jaguar/PS1/SNES) Binary 9 Studios (GBA) Cowboy Rodeo, J.A.W. (MeeGo/PlayStation Network)
- Publishers: 21st Century Entertainment: Game Boy; WW: GameTek; BRA: Playtronic GameTek (SNES) Jaguar; NA/EU: 21st Century Entertainment, Computer West; JP: Messe Sansao, Inc. VAP (PlayStation) Ubi Soft (GBA) Cowboy Rodeo (iOS/MeeGo/Nokia N9/PSN) Rebellion Developments (Linux/OS X/Windows)
- Producers: Barry Simpson; Fredrik Liljegren
- Programmers: Andreas Axelsson; Ulf Mandorff
- Artist: Markus Nyström
- Composer: Olof Gustafsson
- Platforms: Amiga, Amiga CD32, Atari Jaguar, Game Boy, Game Boy Advance, iOS, Linux, MeeGo, Nokia N9, Microsoft Windows, MS-DOS, OS X, PlayStation, PlayStation Network, Super Nintendo Entertainment System
- Release: EU: October 1992
- Genre: Pinball
- Modes: Single-player, multiplayer

Pinball Fantasies is a 1992 pinball video game originally developed by Digital Illusions and published by 21st Century Entertainment in Europe for the Amiga home computers. It is the sequel to Pinball Dreams, which was released earlier in the same year on multiple platforms. In the game, players can choose between any of four available playfields, each of which have their own thematic and main objectives in order to obtain the highest score possible.

Pinball Fantasies was created by the same team who previously developed Pinball Dreams and although it was initially released for the Amiga computers, the title was later ported to other computers and consoles including the Amiga CD32, Atari Jaguar, Game Boy, MS-DOS, PlayStation and Super Nintendo Entertainment System, with each one featuring several changes and additions compared to the original version.

Upon its release on the Amiga, Pinball Fantasies was met with critical acclaim from video game magazines and garnered praise for several aspects such as the presentation, visuals, audio, gameplay and overall improvements from its predecessor. Other versions of the game were met with a mostly similar positive response from reviewers, with some publications like PC Gamer regarding it as one of the best video games of all time. A follow-up, Pinball Illusions, was released in 1995.

== Gameplay ==
Amiga version screenshot

Like Pinball Dreams, Pinball Fantasies is an arcade-style pinball game featuring four types of pinball tables and each one has their own main objective, gameplay mechanics and thematic. The game has various levels of difficulty and the player can set the number of balls for play, among other gameplay options. In certain versions of the game, high-scores and other settings made by the player are automatically kept via the cartridge's internal EEPROM, as well as reset the internal memory of the cartridge to erase saved high-scores and personal settings.

=== Tables ===
"Party Land", the table included in the shareware release, is oriented around an amusement park where the letters of either "PARTY" or "CRAZY" must be lit to start a high-scoring event. "Speed Devils" is focused on car racing and the players must overtake cars to take the lead position. "Billion Dollar Gameshow" is a game show-style table where players attempt to win prizes by achieving certain combinations of ramps. "Stones 'N Bones" is based on a haunted house, where players must light eight successively more rewarding modes by completing a bank of targets marked "STONE-BONE" and then cycle continuously through the modes.

All four tables award one extra ball at the instant the highest score on the list is exceeded, and when the match at the end succeeds. Each table also has one special ramp (Speed Devils has two), which keeps track of the number of hits as a running total of Cyclones (Party Land), Miles (Speed Devils), Skills (Billion Dollar Gameshow) or Screams (Stones 'N Bones). The first shot counts for two. Each of these shots is worth 100,000 points in the bonus. With the exception of Party Land, the tables also award special awards at specific numbers. Each of the four tables has one or two high-scoring rounds that can be started by achieving certain objectives. Specific numbers of Miles and Skills trigger their respective tables' rounds. The scores for these modes, excluding "Tower Hunt", are awarded as part of the bonus though not multiplied and can be lost if the game is tilted.

== Development and release ==
Pinball Fantasies was created by the original team who previously developed Pinball Dreams at Digital Illusions. Initially the developer wanted to rewrite the ball physics, but were convinced by Andrew Hewson to focus on a sequel using the same game engine. Producer Barry Simpson led the project's development process, with Fredrik Liljegren acting as manager and chief. Andreas Axelsson and Ulf Mandorff served as programmers, while Olof Gustafsson composed the soundtrack and created the sound effects. Markus Nyström acted as the game's sole artist. The game was first released for the Amiga by 21st Century Entertainment in Europe in October 1992. In September 1993, an Amiga CD32 conversion was released, based upon the improved Amiga Advanced Graphics Architecture (AGA) version for the Amiga 1200 and Amiga 4000. It was later ported to MS-DOS computers by FrontLine Design, offering multiple audio options. The DOS port was digitally re-released by Rebellion Developments on 22 February 2011 on Good Old Games with support for Microsoft Windows. It received an OS X build on 23 April 2013 and a Linux build on 19 August 2014 respectively. A compilation including the tables from Pinball Mania was released for DOS as Pinball Fantasies Deluxe.

In February 1995, versions for both the Game Boy and Super Nintendo Entertainment System were developed by Spidersoft and released in North America and Europe by GameTek. The Super NES port contains all four tables and the same music as the Amiga version, but suffers from a limited color palette. The SNES version was also published in Brazil by Playtronic in February 1996. In June 1995, an Atari Jaguar conversion by Spidersoft with extra colors was co-published by 21st Century Entertainment and Computer West in North America and Europe. The Jaguar port was also distributed in Japan by Messe Sansao. A PlayStation compilation created by Spidersoft titled Pinball Fantasies Deluxe was published exclusively in Japan by VAP on 25 October 1996, which also includes the Pinball Mania tables but these have to be unlocked first.

A Game Boy Advance version of the game, under the title Pinball Challenge Deluxe, with tables added from Pinball Dreams, was released only in Europe by Ubi Soft. On 20 July 2009, an iOS version was released by Cowboy Rodeo. Between October and December of the same year, a PlayStation Network version was released by Cowboy Rodeo for PlayStation Portable and PlayStation 3. A Nokia N9 version was released 20 July 2011 by Cowboy Rodeo in the Nokia Store. In 2012, a 3D/HD rendition was released for iOS by Cowboy Rodeo.

== Reception ==
Reception
Review scores
Publication	Scores							
Publication	Amiga	CD32	DOS	Game Boy	SNES	Jaguar	iOS	PSN
4Players	—N/a	—N/a	—N/a	—N/a	—N/a	—N/a	80 / 100	76 / 100
ASM	(A1200) 10 / 12	—N/a	11 / 12	—N/a	—N/a	—N/a	—N/a	—N/a
AllGame	—N/a	—N/a	—N/a	—N/a	—N/a	2.5/5	—N/a	—N/a
Amiga Action	95%	91%	—N/a	—N/a	—N/a	—N/a	—N/a	—N/a
Amiga Computing	90%	90%	—N/a	—N/a	—N/a	—N/a	—N/a	—N/a
Amiga Dream	88%	91%	—N/a	—N/a	—N/a	—N/a	—N/a	—N/a
Amiga Force	—N/a	96 / 100	—N/a	—N/a	—N/a	—N/a	—N/a	—N/a
Amiga Format	90% 8 / 10	85%	—N/a	—N/a	—N/a	—N/a	—N/a	—N/a
Amiga Games	84%	—N/a	—N/a	—N/a	—N/a	—N/a	—N/a	—N/a
Amiga Joker	83% (A1200) 84%	83%	—N/a	—N/a	—N/a	—N/a	—N/a	—N/a
Amiga Mania	84%	—N/a	—N/a	—N/a	—N/a	—N/a	—N/a	—N/a
Amiga Power	89% (A1200) 91%	90%	—N/a	—N/a	—N/a	—N/a	—N/a	—N/a
ACAR	91%	91%	—N/a	—N/a	—N/a	—N/a	—N/a	—N/a
AGH	—N/a	—N/a	—N/a	—N/a	—N/a	4 / 10	—N/a	—N/a
CVG	90 / 100	—N/a	—N/a	—N/a	—N/a	—N/a	—N/a	—N/a
Consoles +	—N/a	—N/a	—N/a	—N/a	82%	80%	—N/a	—N/a
CU Amiga	65%	85%	—N/a	—N/a	—N/a	—N/a	—N/a	—N/a
Datormagazin	98%	—N/a	—N/a	—N/a	—N/a	—N/a	—N/a	—N/a
EGM	—N/a	—N/a	—N/a	5/10, 4/10, 3/10, 4/10	—N/a	—N/a	—N/a	—N/a
Eurogamer	—N/a	—N/a	—N/a	—N/a	—N/a	—N/a	—N/a	9 / 10
Génération 4	76%	—N/a	90% (DX) 62%	—N/a	—N/a	—N/a	—N/a	—N/a
Joypad	—N/a	—N/a	—N/a	—N/a	—N/a	70%	—N/a	—N/a
Joystick	85%	86%	85%	—N/a	—N/a	—N/a	—N/a	—N/a
MAN!AC	—N/a	—N/a	—N/a	—N/a	68%	70%	—N/a	—N/a
Mega Fun	—N/a	—N/a	—N/a	68%	—N/a	74%	—N/a	—N/a
Micromanía	—N/a	—N/a	90 / 100	—N/a	—N/a	—N/a	—N/a	—N/a
Next Generation	—N/a	—N/a	—N/a	—N/a	2/5	—N/a	—N/a	—N/a
Nintendo Player	—N/a	—N/a	—N/a	—N/a	2/6	—N/a	—N/a	—N/a
TOfAG	86% (A1200) 89%	90%	—N/a	—N/a	—N/a	—N/a	—N/a	—N/a
PC Games	—N/a	—N/a	90%	—N/a	—N/a	—N/a	—N/a	—N/a
PC Joker	—N/a	—N/a	(DX) 85%	—N/a	—N/a	—N/a	—N/a	—N/a
PC Player	—N/a	—N/a	72 / 100 (DX) 72 / 100	—N/a	—N/a	—N/a	—N/a	—N/a
Play Time	83%	78%	90%	—N/a	—N/a	—N/a	—N/a	—N/a
Player One	—N/a	—N/a	—N/a	72%	75%	62%	—N/a	—N/a
Power Play	78%	—N/a	75% (DX) 60%	—N/a	—N/a	—N/a	—N/a	—N/a
Score	—N/a	—N/a	81%	—N/a	—N/a	—N/a	—N/a	—N/a
Tilt	17 / 20	—N/a	—N/a	—N/a	—N/a	—N/a	—N/a	—N/a
Top Secret	—N/a	—N/a	10 / 10	—N/a	—N/a	—N/a	—N/a	—N/a
Total!	—N/a	—N/a	—N/a	—N/a	3- (C-)	—N/a	—N/a	—N/a
Video Games	—N/a	—N/a	—N/a	61%	68%	72%	—N/a	—N/a
Awards
Publication(s)				Award(s)				
PC Gamer UK (1994)				#19 Top 50 PC Games of All Time (DOS)				
PC Gamer US (1994–1995)				#33 Top 40 Games of All Time, Best Arcade Game (DOS)				

Pinball Fantasies was a major commercial success, and among its era's highest-selling games.

GamePro panned the Super NES version. The reviewer remarked that though there is a large number of tables, the scrolling is so jerky that the game is almost unplayable. He further criticized that the graphics are dull and fail to make the ramps and obstacles of the tables stand out from the backgrounds. Next Generation also found the fact that the Super NES version displays less than half of the table at a time to be a problem, in part because of the poor scrolling, but also because "Since a lot of the scoring devices are near the top of the table, it means that most of the time you're shooting blind."

GamePro gave the Jaguar version an only slightly more positive assessment. The reviewer praised the graphics but assessed the game to be completely lacking in fun due to the limited gameplay, stating that "anybody who thinks a $60 video game should offer some imaginative surprises will be severely disappointed."

In 1994, PC Gamer US named Pinball Fantasies the 33rd best computer game ever. The editors hailed it as "the best and most realistic pinball action ever seen on a PC screen". That same year, PC Gamer UK named it the 19th best computer game of all time. The editors wrote, "[I]f Pinball's your thing, there's currently nothing on the PC (or any home system, for that matter) better than this". In 1995, PC Gamer US presented Pinball Fantasies with its 1994 "Best Arcade Game" award.

The four reviewers of Electronic Gaming Monthly gave the Game Boy version a 4 out of 10, citing a lack of excitement in any of the tables, overly simplistic graphics, and annoying sound effects.
