= PGA Tour Golf 486 =

1994 video game

- Developer: Hitmen Productions
- Publisher: Electronic Arts
- Platforms: MS-DOS, 3DO
- Release: 1994: MS-DOS; 1995: 3DO
- Genre: Sports

PGA Tour Golf 486 is a sports video game developed by American studio Hitmen Productions and published by Electronic Arts for MS-DOS in 1994 and 3DO in 1995.

== Gameplay ==
PGA Tour Golf 486 features digitized backgrounds and animations, PGA tour statistics for players, and four ways of playing.

== Reception ==
Reception

Review scores
Publication	Score
Next Generation	2/5 (MS-DOS)
CD-ROM Today	4/5 (MS-DOS)

PGA Tour Golf 486 received mixed reviews upon its release. Next Generation gave it two stars out of five, and commented that "the near continual access delays from both the CD-ROM and unnecessary user prompts, along with a frustrating targeting system, will keep all but the most die-hard golfers from ever being entertained."

- PC Gamer noted the game's realistic course design and inclusion of real-life PGA Tour professionals, which were standout features for the time. However, the review also mentioned that the game required a high-end PC to run smoothly, which limited its audience.
- Computer Gaming World praised the game for its depth and strategic gameplay, stating that it offered a challenging experience for serious golf enthusiasts. The magazine particularly highlighted the game's attention to detail in replicating real golf mechanics and the variety of courses available.
- PC Gamer (December 1994) – The review highlighted the realistic course design and the inclusion of real-life PGA Tour professionals as standout features. However, it also noted that the game required a high-end PC to run smoothly, potentially limiting its audience.
- Computer Gaming World (January 1995) – Praised the depth and strategic elements of the gameplay, stating it offered a challenging experience for serious golf enthusiasts. The magazine particularly highlighted the game's attention to detail in replicating real golf mechanics and the variety of courses available.
- PC Games (October 1994) – Commended the game for its detailed graphics and accurate representation of golf physics, but criticized the slow loading times due to the CD-ROM access, which could detract from the overall experience.
- PC Player (October 1994) – The review was generally positive, highlighting the intuitive controls and the ability to play multiple courses. However, it also mentioned that the game's difficulty might be off-putting to casual gamers.
- MikroBitti (December 1994) – Noted the game’s realistic graphics and sound effects, which were advanced for its time, but pointed out that the game's learning curve was steep, requiring players to have some prior knowledge of golf.
- ASM (Aktueller Software Markt) (December 1994) – Gave a favorable review, emphasizing the game's variety of gameplay modes and the accuracy of its simulation, but also remarked on occasional performance issues on lower-end systems.
