= Benefactor (video game) =

1994 video game

- Developer: Digital Illusions CE
- Publisher: Psygnosis
- Designers: Andreas Axelsson; Fredrik Liliegren; Markus Nyström; Patrik Bergdahl; Thomas Andersson
- Programmer: Thomas Andersson
- Artist: Patrik Bergdahl
- Composer: Olof Gustafsson
- Platforms: Amiga; Amiga CD32
- Release: 1994
- Genre: Platform
- Mode: Single-player

Benefactor is a video game for the Amiga developed by the Swedish team Digital Illusions CE (DICE) and published in 1994 by Psygnosis.

== Gameplay ==
The first level

Benefactor is a mix between a puzzle game and a platform game. It has a similar concept to Psygnosis's earlier, very successful Lemmings.

The player plays Ben E. Factor, who has resigned from the military to become an overall all-around good guy. Factor's mission is to save a group of "Merry Men", who have been kidnapped from their home planet and imprisoned over 60 levels.

Ben E. Factor is controlled directly, like a platform game character. Factor has to avoid all enemy creatures (hitting them would reduce health), and pull switches to extend the land, or many other things. Factor can find keys on the level to open the locks in the Merry Men's cells. When freed, a Merry Man automatically proceeds on a pre-set mission, with the aid of helping Factor to free the other Merry Men and complete the level. Once all Merry Men on a level have been freed, Factor has to go back to his starting point to complete the level. Although colliding with monsters reduces Factor's health, Merry Men are not harmed by monsters.

There are three difficulty levels: easy, normal and hard. On easy, enemies do less damage. On hard enemies do more damage and any damage taken is carried over to the next level. Score is gained by picking up bonus items and at the end of each level score is awarded based on how much health the player has got left.

In later levels, some of the Merry Men are "evil". "Evil" Merry Men, distinguished by their monochrome appearance, do not follow any preset pattern but instead walk blindly forwards, like the lemmings in the Lemmings games, without regard to dangers lying in their path. "Evil" Merry Men have to be turned into "good" Merry Men by dropping a bucket of paint over them before they can be rescued.

There is no "lives" counter in the game, meaning the player can make unlimited attempts. There is also a password displayed at the completion of each level allowing the player to continue playing from the start of the next level.

Benefactor has support for data disks but no official data disks for it have ever been published. (One unofficial data disk with seven new levels is available for download on Aminet.)

In keeping with Psygnosis's tradition of including references to earlier games, Benefactor includes a level called Lemmings? in which Ben E. Factor has to clear a path for twenty "evil" Merry Men marching blindly forwards across a series of pillars. This level is a reference to the game Lemmings and even the music comes from that game. This is the only level where "evil" Merry Men can use the exit without first becoming "good".

== Development ==
During development, Frederick Lilligren of DICE noted that Benefactor's gameplay had been compared to that of Lemmings. In Amiga Power's May 1993 issue, it had a projected release date of September.

== Release ==
A version for the Mega Drive was planned but never released.
