= Crash Commando =

2008 video game

- PlayStation Store icon
- Developer: EPOS Game Studios
- Publisher: Sony Computer Entertainment
- Designer: Jan Almqvist
- Platform: PlayStation 3
- Release: December 18, 2008
- Genre: Shooter
- Modes: Single-player, multiplayer

Crash Commando is a 2008 shooter video game developed by EPOS Game Studios and published by Sony Computer Entertainment for the PlayStation 3. It was one of the few games that could be launched directly from PlayStation Home.

== Gameplay ==
A screenshot of gameplay in Crash Commando.

Crash Commando, is a side-scrolling multiplayer shooter game pitting two commando factions, the Grunts and the Jarheads, against each other. Crash Commando is a fast-paced, comedic game with over-the-top, slapstick action that features exaggerated gore and effects.

The player controls a commando with a range of weapons and other equipment at his disposal, including a jetpack, a rocket launcher, C4, jeeps, and tanks. Each map consists of two gameplay layers the player can move between via portals in the environment.

An update to the game included a new playable game mode: Heist. A bag of money is spawned onto the map and the two teams are tasked with grabbing the money and bringing it to their own safe, located at home base. Along with the game mode, the pack also comes with two new maps. The update also includes new playable characters.

== Reception ==
Reception

Aggregate score
Aggregator	Score
Metacritic	78/100

Review scores
Publication	Score
GameSpot	8/10
Giant Bomb	4/5
IGN	8.5/10
VideoGamer.com	7/10

Crash Commando received favourable reviews from critics, especially for the multiplayer aspect of the game.
