= Prophecy of the Shadow =

1992 video game

- Developer: Strategic Simulations
- Publisher: Strategic Simulations
- Designer: Jaimi R. R. McEntire
- Writer: Lee Fisher
- Composer: Deane Rettig
- Platform: MS-DOS
- Release: 1992
- Genre: Role-playing video game
- Mode: Single-player

Prophecy of the Shadow is a 1992 fantasy role-playing video game developed by Strategic Simulations for MS-DOS. The game was released in both English and German versions.

== Gameplay ==
The game plays from an isometric top-down viewpoint, similar to a contemporary game of the time, Ultima VII: The Black Gate. The player character has three statistics: Health, Magic, and Agility. Health represents the stamina, life, and strength of the character. Magic represents the level of power the character can use to conjure spells. Agility represents the ability for the character to dodge enemy attacks. The game uses an overhead perspective, with icons on the left side of the screen that the player can select to have the character to drop or use items or give them away, or to attack or talk to other characters, and also for the character to go inside buildings.

== Plot ==
Prophecy of the Shadow is a game in which the player character must find out why the land has been slowly dying. The player's character is a disciple of Larkin of Bannerwick. The character is blamed when their master is murdered. The character has magical powers, but the king has outlawed all magic.

== Reception ==
The New Straits Times in 1992 called Prophecy of the Shadow the game that Richard Garriott would have produced were he an SSI employee. It wrote that "Gameplay could not be better", citing the user interface, large world to explore, and use of humor. The newspaper concluded "I can wholeheartedly say, 'Good show, old chaps! Just don't give us any more recycled trash like Dark Queen of Krynn'." QuestBusters called the game "a significant improvement over [SSI's] Gold Box series — and a lot of fun to play". It liked the "beautiful digitized graphics and over 50 sound effects", and user interface, and concluded that the game was "just plain fun". The game was reviewed in 1993 in Dragon #189 by Hartley, Patricia, and Kirk Lesser in "The Role of Computers" column. The reviewers gave the game 3 out of 5 stars. Computer Gaming World called Prophecy of the Shadow "a refreshingly enjoyable adventure, targeted primarily at role-playing neophytes". The magazine stated that "the quality of the digitized animation is surprisingly good", and recommended the game both to new adventure gamers and those "looking for something new and refreshing". It received a 4 out of 5 review in Datormagazin Vol 1992 No 14 (Aug 1992), reviewed by Göran Fröjdh.

Jim Trunzo reviewed Prophecy of the Shadow in White Wolf #33 (Sept./Oct., 1992), rating it a 4 out of 5 and stated that "Overall, Prophecy of the Shadow is simple enough for newcomers to fantasy gaming yet interesting enough for veterans. The game is a nice change of pace from large-party, 200-hour marathon games."

== Reviews ==
- ASM (Aktueller Software Markt) - Aug, 1992
