= Analogue Pocket =

Handheld game console

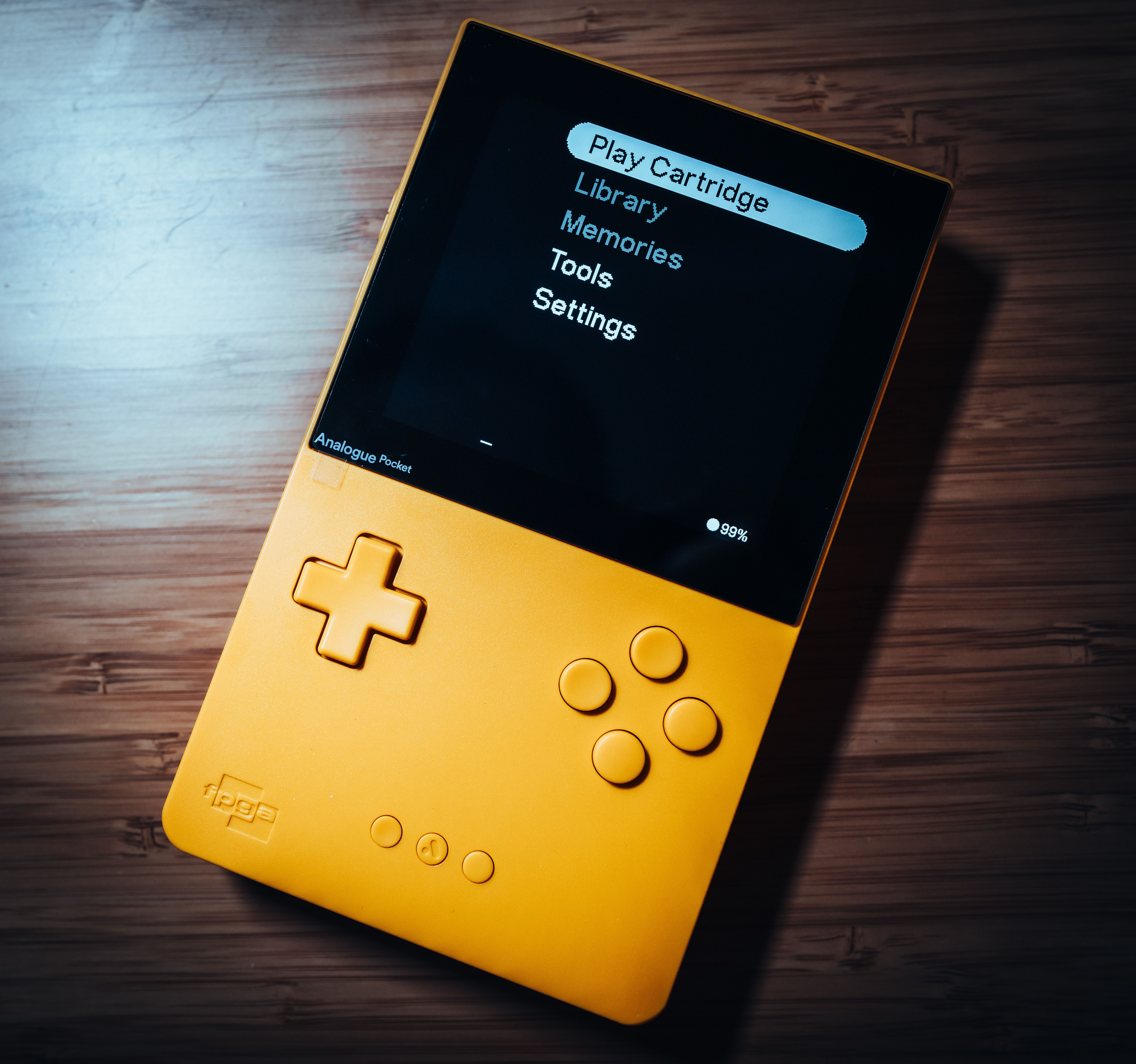
- Manufacturer: Analogue
- Type: Handheld game console
- Released: December 13, 2021
- Introductory price: US$199.99
- Media: ROM cartridges: Game Boy Game Pak; Game Gear (Note: Adapter required); Neo Geo Pocket; Neo Geo Pocket Color; Atari Lynx; HuCard
- Operating system: Analogue OS
- CPU: Altera Cyclone V; Altera Cyclone 10
- Display: 3.5" backlit 1600x1440 LTPS LCD
- Connectivity: 3.5 mm headphone jack, Game Boy link cable, MicroSD, USB-C (power and dock interface)
- Website: analogue.co/pocket

The Analogue Pocket is a handheld game console designed and manufactured by Analogue. Announced in October 2019 and released on December 13, 2021, it uses field-programmable gate array (FPGA) chips to play games from various handheld consoles up to the sixth generation.

== Design ==
The Analogue Pocket is designed around an Altera Cyclone V FPGA chip, which can be reprogrammed to mimic the hardware of various game consoles. Unlike an emulator, an FPGA can function nearly identically to the original hardware. Out of the box, the Analogue Pocket is designed to replicate the hardware of Game Boy, Game Boy Color, and Game Boy Advance consoles. The Pocket has a physical cartridge slot at the rear of the console which accepts most Game Boy Game Pak titles.

This FPGA can also be reprogrammed to replicate the Game Gear, Neo Geo Pocket/Pocket Color, Atari Lynx, TurboGrafx-16 and adapters (sold separately) allow their game cartridges to be plugged into the cartridge slot. Due to the near identical hardware of the Master System and Game Gear, Master System cartridges can also be run from the cartridge slot via a third-party adapter in addition to the Analogue Game Gear adapter. An additional Altera Cyclone 10 FPGA handles system management within the Analogue Pocket.

For expanded connectivity, the Analogue Pocket offers a microSD card slot. A USB-C port is included for charging the built-in lithium-ion battery and to connect to a proprietary docking station, Analogue Dock, which enables wireless controller support and HDMI output.

== Release ==
The Analogue Pocket was announced on October 16, 2019. but its release was delayed several times due to global chip shortages related to the COVID-19 pandemic. It finally launched on December 13, 2021 in black and white colors. Since then, Analogue has expanded the Pocket's lineup with a glow-in-the-dark version in September 2023, transparent colors in October 2023 and models in classic Game Boy colors in November 2023. Analogue released all-aluminium models of the Pocket in white, black, gray and indigo colors on July 15, 2024.

=== Post-release software updates ===
Initially planned for January 2022, the 1.1 software update arrived in July of that year. This update introduced openFPGA, a framework which allows third party developers to develop FPGA simulation cores using Pocket's hardware. It introduced emulation for the PDP-1 computer with the classic game Spacewar!, along with save states ("Memories") and informative "info cards" ("Library") for inserted cartridges.

In December 2023, Analogue released firmware updates 1.2 and 2.0. Version 1.2 addressed sleep/wake and save state issues, improved compatibility between adapters and FPGAs, and allowed cores to detect the docked state. Version 2.0 brought custom color palettes for Game Boy games, allowed FPGA cores to switch aspect ratios when docked and resolved a video issue with certain openFPGA cores in docked mode. Firmware update version 2.2 brought support for the Lynx, TurboGrafx-16 and Neo Geo Pocket Color cartridge adapters.

== Hardware ==
The Analogue Pocket has the following hardware specifications:

Height	5.86 in (149 mm)
Width	3.4 in (86 mm)
Depth	0.86 in (22 mm)
Weight	275 g (9.7 oz)
Display	3.5-inch (diagonal) backlit LTPS color liquid-crystal display (LCD), variable refresh (30–62 Hz)
Resolution	1600 (w) × 1440 (h) pixels (10:9 aspect ratio) (Note: Same aspect ratio and 10x resolution of the Game Boy/Game Boy Color)
Power	4,300 mAh lithium-ion battery; USB-C charging with 18W fast charging
Battery life	6–10 hours
CPU	Altera Cyclone V FPGA with 49,000 logic elements; Altera Cyclone 10 FPGA with 15,000 logic elements
Memory	3.4 MB Block RAM (on Cyclone V chip); 2 × 16 MB 16-bit Cellular RAM; 64 MB 16-bit synchronous DRAM; 256 KB 16-bit asynchronous SRAM
Sound	Stereo speakers, 3.5 mm headphone jack
I/O	Game Link Cable; Game Boy Game Pak slot (also accepts Game Gear adapter, Neo Geo Pocket/Pocket Color adapter, Atari Lynx adapter or TurboGrafx-16 adapter); USB-C (power and dock interface); MicroSD card slot
Controls	D-pad; Eight action buttons; Menu button; Volume buttons; Power button

== Reception ==
In a 2021 review, Sam Machkovech of Ars Technica praised the Pocket's screen, accuracy in simulating Nintendo hardware, audio quality, controls and other features, but criticized its uneven weight distribution and lack of clarity on how the add-on functionality would work. His verdict reads, "What, did you miss all the glowing praise? Buy it—if you can."

In 2022, Brendan Nystedt of Wired gave the Pocket a score of 8/10, praising its screen, controls, compatibility with Nintendo cartridges and potential with OpenFPGA, but criticizing its volume and power buttons as "annoying", the lack of protection for the cartridge slot and the inferior layout for Game Boy Advance games. He wrote, "If you don't care about the nostalgia brought on by using an actual Nintendo Game Boy, the Analogue Pocket might be the ultimate upgrade for your retro games collection."

=== Awards ===
The Analogue Pocket won a Red Dot Design Award in 2022 It was nominated for Wallpaper's 2019 Design Awards. The Pocket was also awarded two Fast Company awards for Best Product Design of 2020 and Best Design Innovations of 2020 in the North America region.
