= Paparazzi!: Tales of Tinseltown =

1995 video game

- Developer: Museworthy
- Publisher: Activision
- Platforms: Macintosh, Windows (Win 3.x/95)
- Release: 1995
- Genre: FMV game
- Mode: Single-player

Paparazzi!: Tales of Tinseltown is a video game developed by American studio Museworthy and published by Activision for the Macintosh, Windows 3.x and Windows 95.

== Gameplay ==
Paparazzi!: Tales of Tinseltown is a game in which the player is a freelance photographer looking to succeed in tabloid photojournalism.

== Development ==
Paparazzi! Tales of Tinseltown was developed by Museworthy. Established in Addison, Texas in 1991, the company had previously operated as an advertising agency for local television and radio stations. In early 1994 founders Jim Freeman and Jason English wanted to use their video production skills to create something that was entirely their own while taking advantage of the popularity of multimedia CD-ROM games of the era. Freeman, serving as producer on Paparazzi!, described it as a new medium that was neither game nor film but a synthesis of both. English wrote the script, created most of the graphic design, and composed all the music and Foley sound effects. John Kelly and Joe Moseley were hired, bringing with them additional video production and computer graphics experience. A fifth member, Doyle Calvert, did all of the programming and media integration; did some of the game design, interface, and graphics; and produced the golden master.

Filming took place in Dallas over one month during the summer of 1994. Money was raised through outside investors while many of the acting roles were performed by either the designers themselves or by friends and family. Software used to edit the assets included the Adobe programs Director, Premiere, and Photoshop. Work was completed in just four months and the team subsequently had a successful promotional of the game at COMDEX in search of a distributor. By April 1995, Museworthy had signed a three-game deal with Activision. A contractual dispute between the two companies erupted shortly after the release of Paparazzi, jeopardizing its already largely completed second game Shyster! and the third unnamed project.

== Reception ==
Reception

Review scores
Publication	Score
CNET Gamecenter	Try It
Computer Game Review	80/100
Hyper	50/100
Next Generation	1/5
PC Gamer (US)	47%
PC Games (DE)	62%
CD-ROM Today	2.5/5
Computer Player	5/10
Entertainment Weekly	C+
K	700/1000
PC Joker	74%
PC Player	74/100
Power Play	32%
Top Secret	21/30

Next Generation reviewed the Macintosh version of the game, rating it one star out of five, and stated that "For computer first-timers – your parents, say – Paparazzi offers something flashy and mildly amusing to showcase their new CD drive; for gamers, it offers a pair of attractive mirrored coasters."
