= Midtown Madness 3 =

2003 video game

- Cover art featuring a Mini Cooper, Chevrolet Corvette, and Volkswagen Beetle.
- Developer: Digital Illusions CE (Note: Mobile version developed by BeTomorrow.)
- Publisher: Microsoft Game Studios (Note: Mobile version published by In-Fusio.)
- Producers: Johan Döhl; Andreas Axelsson
- Designer: Andreas Roman
- Programmers: Joakim Grundwall; Mattias Gruvman
- Artist: Robert Runesson
- Writer: Andreas Roman
- Composer: Olof Gustafsson
- Platforms: Xbox, mobile phones
- Release: Xbox: NA: 17 June 2003; EU: 27 June 2003; Mobile: EU: 4 November 2004
- Genre: Racing
- Modes: Single-player, multiplayer

Midtown Madness 3 is a 2003 racing video game developed by Digital Illusions CE and published by Microsoft Game Studios for the Xbox. It is the third and currently to date, final game in the Midtown Madness series. A version for mobile phones, developed by BeTomorrow and published by In-Fusio, was released in 2004. This marked a change from the developer of the first two games, Angel Studios, which had moved on to work on the Midnight Club series. The Xbox-exclusive console release and change of developer heralded a significant graphical improvement to maintain the console's graphical standards.

Like the first sequel, the game features two major cities in which events take place; Paris and Washington, D.C. Here players can compete in a variety of race types and take on roles such as taxi and ambulance drivers. Online modes were available via Xbox Live until 15 April 2010. Midtown Madness 3 is now playable online again on the replacement Xbox Live servers called Insignia. Reception for Midtown Madness 3 was positive, with aggregators GameRankings reporting a score of 80.24%, and Metacritic a score 76 out of 100.

== Gameplay ==
Midtown Madness 3 features various missions in both of its open worlds. Here the player must deliver packages faster than a rival AI player.

As with the previous games in the series, the player drives any of several different vehicles around open world maps modeled on real-life cities. Midtown Madness 3 recreates the cities of Paris and Washington, D.C. in the game. The city maps cover smaller areas than the real-life cities, though they are larger than their comparable counterparts in Midtown Madness and Midtown Madness 2. In single-player mode, the player can freely roam, race, or complete objective-based missions. In Cruise (free roam) mode, the player can modify the number of pedestrians and amount of traffic, change the weather and season, the time of day and the season, and collect car-specific paint jobs, in a car selected by the user. In Blitz races, the player goes through all the given checkpoints in any order and races to the finish line before time runs out. In Checkpoint races, the player goes through the checkpoints in any order and gets to the finish line before their opponents. In the Work Undercover mission mode, the player attempts to complete driving-based objectives that vary for each city: in Paris, the player works as a delivery guy, taxi driver, chauffeur, security guard, ambulance driver, police officer, and special agent, while in Washington, D.C., the player works as a pizza delivery man, rental car driver, limo driver, car salesman, stunt driver, police officer, and private eye.

The game supported Xbox Live for online multiplayer gaming, and featured a split-screen mode for offline multiplayer. Extra downloadable content was available via Xbox Live to expand the game's original premise. Capture the Gold is a mode where gold is stashed around the city and the player must take it to a hideout. Other players will attempt to steal the gold. Checkpoint has players race against others on predefined tracks around the city. Cruise is a free-roam mode around the city with others. In Hunter, one player starts off as the Hunter and everyone else in the game is Prey. As the Hunter captures Prey, they in turn become Hunters, and the last person who is Prey stands alone as the winner. Stayaway is a mode where whoever holds the rabbit for the longest time wins. Tag is a mode where players chase each other and try to bump each other's cars.

== Plot ==
Midtown Madness 3 has two stories in its Work Undercover mode, one set in Paris and the other in Washington, D.C.

=== Paris ===
Famous race car driver Dieter Kleinmann has arrived in Paris to receive a Lifetime Achievement Award. The player character's secret agency is tasked with protecting Kleinmann through unearthing potential plots surrounding him. They work undercover in various odd jobs, all with the end goal of protecting Kleinmann. Mathilda becomes a rival to the player. The player character and Mathilda regularly sabotage each other while on the job, and also have friendly races between them and coworkers. Three Scandinavians — Sven, Olle, and Inga, become persons of interest as they have recently arrived in Paris to see Kleinmann receive his award, and are all staying at the same hotel. Paris police reveal to the player character while they're chauffeuring Sven to the bus station that Sven is a wanted fugitive. They deliver Sven to his destination despite orders from the police to stop. Sven exits the limo and is arrested by the police. While driving an armored vehicle the player character learns that Sven is a kidnapper. They are tasked with transporting Sven to the bus station where the police will begin deportation. After the player character picks up Sven from the police station, Olle and Inga, who were waiting outside the police station, begin an assault on the armored vehicle in an attempt to immobilize it. They fail to stop the vehicle, and Sven is successfully deported.

Another piece of the Scandinavians' plans is revealed when the player is informed of a fake copy of Dieter Kleinmann's lifetime achievement award being delivered to a man a few days prior, a task that the player, while working as a delivery driver, personally carried out for Sven. Suspecting that the Scandinavians might attempt to switch the award, the player is then tasked with delivering the real copy of the award to a different location. As the player takes off, Olle and Inga target the player again in an attempt to stop the delivery of the real award and seize it for themselves. They fail and the player successfully delivers the award. Later, the agency boss reveals that Kleinmann was kidnapped after the award ceremony took place. The player character is assigned to be a paramedic, specifically to help those who were injured in the kidnapping plot. While transporting Klienmann's injured bodyguard to the hospital the exact details of the kidnapping would later be revealed: Olle and Inga smashed Kleinmann's limo, kidnapping him. With this information the agency devises a plan to stop the Scandinavians. The police agency receive intel on Inga's location, and the player character is tasked with immobilizing her van. They succeed and Inga is subsequently arrested. With Olle still on the loose, the police place roadblocks throughout the city, with the player character delivering officers to help reinforce several locations.

The player character tracks Olle's cell phone and follows him to the Scandinavians' hideout. They discover several more Scandinavian criminals are hiding that are working for Olle and Inga. The secret agency would later investigate the hideout, but there is no sign of Kleinmann. However the agency strikes a deal with five Scandinavian kidnappers to testify against Sven, Olle, and Inga in exchange for immunity. They are delivered to the police station. Their testimony helps reveal Olle's whereabouts, and his plan to escape Paris with Kleinmann in the back of his van. The player character pursues Olle, successfully immobilizes his vehicle before he leaves the city, and Kleinmann is rescued.

=== Washington, D.C. ===
The Washington, D.C. plot revolves around the Tortellini brothers, Michael and Stefano, who are filming and directing a movie, The Quick and the Slippery, in the city. The player character's role, whilst undercover as a private investigator, is to find out who the Tortellini brothers are secretly connected to by working for them in various ways, in part because a rival film producer is in town. Whilst undercover, the player character helps supply a variety of vehicles for filming or personal purposes, and runs personal errands for them. Angelina coincidentally continues to act as a rival for the player in the various businesses the player character works undercover for. The player character first meets Michael when delivering a replacement pizza to the brothers' apartment after Angelina made an unacceptable pizza delivery to them earlier. The player also makes a covert pizza delivery to Michael later in the day.

The player character and their boss quickly suspect that Michael is secretly dealing with someone in some way. Initially they suspect and then rule out screenwriter Mr. Pickie as a potential link. The player character, while chauffeuring Michael and a guest to the train station, overhears Michael signing a contract with the Hot Shot Producer, an unnamed individual who becomes contractually involved with the movie. As the player character continues working undercover, Stefano becomes increasingly suspicious of Michael's intentions, and with the assistance of the player character, identifies where Michael is meeting the producer, the same location where the player secretly delivered a pizza to Michael. The player helps film various stunts for the film. Whilst the player character is undercover as a police officer, the Tortellini brothers begin fighting amongst themselves. Stefano eventually tries to crash Michael's limousine in a car chase around the city, which is thwarted by the player character. Stefano was arrested, but later released. The police department later finds that Stefano was sending prank phone calls to Michael. The player character arrests four actors who stole vehicles off the set of the film.

The player character reprises their original role as a private investigator after finishing their police work. They attempt to get photo evidence of Michael meeting with the Hot Shot Producer to confirm Stefano's suspicions, and eventually discover that Stefano is also secretly working with the Hot Shot Producer. Now knowing that the two brothers both have connections to the Hot Shot Producer, the player character, posing as a personal driver for the Hot Shot Producer, secretly drives Stefano to a rendezvous point with Michael in an attempt to surprise the two, who both are expecting to meet with the Hot Shot Producer. The brothers determine that they were set against each other in a conspiracy to steal the end film. The player character chases after the Hot Shot Producer and stops him from escaping with the film. The producer is arrested, and the Tortellini brothers successfully release their movie.

== Development and release ==
Midtown Madness 3 was announced as being in development in April 2002 as an Xbox-exclusive title, with a tentative release date of late 2002. The game was developed by Digital Illusions CE, who had previously developed Rallisport Challenge for the Xbox. An early development build was showcased to the public for the first time in May the same year. Some of the game's vehicles were licensed from manufacturers, including Ford Motor Company, Lotus, Audi and Hummer. Several landmarks from both Paris and Washington, D.C. were included. The Paris open world stage features the Eiffel Tower, Arc de Triomphe and the Louvre, while Washington, D.C. features Capitol Hill, the White House and Dupont Circle. To promote the game Microsoft released a satirical documentary on the motion capture of various pedestrians in the game. The game was released in North America on June 17, 2003, in Europe ten days later on June 27, and in Japan on August 7. It was packaged later that year in an Xbox console bundle with Halo: Combat Evolved in Europe. Multiple downloadable content packages were made available after the game's release. Four car packs and two track packs were released free to players.

Mobile publisher In-Fusio released two versions of the game for cell phones made by developer BeTomorrow, entitled Midtown Madness 3 Mobile. Smartphones received a full 3D version of the game, while other phones received a top-down 2D version. The studio was given access to all assets from the Xbox version, as well two copies of the console game as reference. Development of the mobile versions was completed in five months. The 2D version of the game runs on Java and Brew phones. The 3D version of the game was exclusive to Windows Phones, which ceased production in October 2017. Midtown Madness 3 Mobile was released in Europe on November 4, 2004.

== Reception ==
Reception

Aggregate scores
| Aggregator | Score |
|---|---|
| GameRankings | 80.24% |
| Metacritic | 76/100 |

Review scores
| Publication | Score |
|---|---|
| Electronic Gaming Monthly | 7.33/10 |
| Eurogamer | 9/10 |
| Game Informer | 5.25/10 |
| GamePro | 4/5 |
| GameRevolution | B |
| GameSpot | 8/10 |
| GameSpy | 4/5 |
| GameZone | 8.2/10 |
| IGN | 8.7/10 |
| Official Xbox Magazine (US) | 8.9/10 |
| Entertainment Weekly | D |

The game was met with positive reception, although slightly less than the first two games. GameRankings and Metacritic gave it a score of 80.24% and 76 out of 100. It received attention from a staff member at motoring magazine Motor Trend, who stated that the game "belongs in your collection."

Gameplay was generally praised by critics, particularly multiplayer over Xbox Live. IGN's Chris Carle called the multiplayer experience a "mad scramble." He noted that multiplayer games were easy to find, and appreciated that the game has six different modes. Christian Nutt of GameSpy enjoyed the Capture the Gold game mode, a variant on classic capture the flag gametypes. The online play was compared to competitor games of its time. GameSpot's Jeff Gerstmann called it "more accessible than its nearest competition, Midnight Club II." The game was a competitor on the PlayStation 2, and developed by Rockstar San Diego, who had developed the previous two Midtown Madness games as Angel Studios.

Opinions on the game's environments were varied. Official Xbox Magazine's review stated that "we can't help but think how much better it would have been with a better choice of cities." The reviewer from Electronic Gaming Monthly felt that the two cities were fun to explore and large in size. Shawn Sanders of GameRevolution felt that the two cities were not enough, and noted that future downloadable content may have improved things. Multiple reviewers noted praised the inclusion of various landmarks. Christian Nutt noted that the cities were "huge arenas ripe for careening around in[, but] neither is going to win awards in the detail arena".
