= Presumed Guilty! =

1989 video game

- Developer: Cosmi
- Publisher: Cosmi
- Platforms: Commodore 64, MS-DOS
- Release: 1989

Presumed Guilty! is a video game published in 1989 by Cosmi for the Commodore 64 and MS-DOS.

== Gameplay ==
Presumed Guilty! is a game where the player is a new investigator for the world-wide computer network Copnet in the then-future of 1996. The first case to investigate is the death of Ray Lamonte who won an award for his satellite laser weapons development.

== Reception ==
Scorpia reviewed the game for Computer Gaming World, and stated "The sloppiness in this game shows throughout, from the errors in the manual through the utilities that don't work properly to the numerous typos and misspellings in the text, the incessant noise of the game (no way to turn off the sound), and the final crash at the end. What might have been a reasonably good game is made frustrating and unenjoyable by the lack of adequate quality control."
