= Pinball Dreams =

1992 video game

- Developer: Digital Illusions
- Publishers: 21st Century Entertainment, GameTek (Game Boy, Game Gear, SNES)
- Producer: Barry Simpson
- Designer: Olof Gustafsson
- Programmer: Andreas Axelsson
- Artist: Markus Nyström
- Composer: Olof Gustafsson
- Platforms: Amiga, Falcon, MS-DOS, Game Boy, Game Boy Advance, Game Gear, GP32, iOS, OS X, PlayStation Network, SNES
- Release: 1992
- Genre: Pinball
- Modes: Single-player, multiplayer

Pinball Dreams is a pinball simulation video game developed by Digital Illusions and originally released for the Amiga in 1992. It spawned several sequels, including Pinball Fantasies and Pinball Illusions. The MS-DOS port was digitally released by Rebellion Developments along with its sequel Pinball Dreams 2 and Pinball Mania on February 22, 2011 on GOG.com with support for Microsoft Windows. It received an OS X build on April 23, 2013; and a Linux build on August 19, 2014.

== Gameplay ==
The game includes four pinball tables:

1. "Ignition", themed around a rocket launch, planets, and space exploration. The Expert Software's '2000 port of the game renamed this table "Rocket".
2. "Steel Wheel", themed around steam trains and the Old West.
3. "Beat Box", themed around the music industry, charts, bands and tours.
4. "Nightmare", themed around a graveyard, ghosts, demons, nightmares and generally evil things. Unlike the other tables in the game, the name of the table in the menu did not reflect the name displayed on the table itself—"Graveyard". Some ports of the game (notably the GameTek port to the Game Boy) name this table "Graveyard" in the menu as well. The layout and some rules of this table is based on Terminator 2: Judgment Day pinball machine released a year earlier.

The version of Pinball Dreams bundled with the Amiga 1200 had a bug which rendered most of Beat Box's advanced features non-functional.

== Development ==
The ball moves according to reasonably realistic physics, and the game was restricted to using table elements which would also be possible to build in reality. Sound and music use module files.

Ports:

- Atari Falcon
- Commodore 64: A preview was released at the Breakpoint demo party in April 2006.
- Game Boy
- Game Gear
- Game Boy Advance: Under the title Pinball Challenge Deluxe, with tables added from Pinball Fantasies.
- GP32: Released in October 2002.
- Super NES: A mostly accurate conversion, including all four tables and near-perfect sound. However, the red "blood" under the top bumper in the "Nightmare" table has been changed to blue and the crosses were removed.
- MS-DOS: Converted by Spidersoft.
- iPhone/iPod Touch: Released in January 2009 by Cowboy Rodeo as Pinball Dreaming: Pinball Dreams.
- PlayStation Network: Released in November 2009 by Cowboy Rodeo.
- iPhone/iPod Touch/iPad: Released in July 2011 by Cowboy Rodeo as Pinball Dreams HD.
- OS X: Released in August 2011 by Cowboy Rodeo as Pinball Dreams HD.
- Amstrad CPC: Released in October 2019 by BG GAMES.

== Reception ==
Reception

Review scores
Publication	Score
Amiga Power	87%
Power Unlimited	80/100(DOS); 85/100 (GB)

Pinball Dreams was a commercial success, selling more than 650,000 copies in its debut year.

Pinball Dreams was overall received positive by press reviews. Electronic Gaming Monthly gave the Game Gear version a 5.8 out of 10, commenting that "Pinball never really worked well on portable systems and Pinball Dreams is no exception. The boards are huge, but the game is a little slow." Power Unlimited gave the Game Boy version a score of 85% summarizing: "Sharp graphics, excellent sound and simple controls all contribute to a game that will hardly get boring. And with the three different cabinets there is also variety.

In 1993 Computer Gaming World criticized the PC version of Pinball Dreams as having "the worst physical model" of four reviewed games, and disliked the "jerk[y]" scrolling. The magazine said in June 1994 that Pinball 2000 "is an average title at a better than average price". In 1996 the magazine ranked Pinball Dreams as the 119th best game of all time, stating, "Smooth scrolling and great ball physics made this Amiga game a wizard's choice." In 2011, Wirtualna Polska ranked it as the fourth best Amiga game.

== Legacy ==
Multiple games based on Pinball Dreams were published by 21st Century Entertainment:

1. Pinball Dreams 2, (1994, MS-DOS), developed by Spidersoft
2. Pinball Mania (1995 MS-DOS), developed by Spidersoft. A Game Boy port was published by GameTek UK.
3. Absolute Pinball (1996, MS-DOS), developed by Unique Development Studios
4. Total Pinball 3D (1996, MS-DOS), developed by Spidersoft
5. Pinball Builder (1996, Windows), developed by Spidersoft
