= Absolute Pinball =

- Developer: Unique Development Studios
- Publisher: 21st Century Entertainment
- Platforms: Windows; MS-DOS
- Release: September 1996
- Genre: 2D Pinball

Absolute Pinball is a 1996 pinball video game developed by Unique Development Studios and published by 21st Century Entertainment. It was released in September 1996. It is largely based on Obsession, the first pinball game from this developer.

part of "Balls N' Bats" table

== Gameplay ==
The aim of the game is to launch the ball and achieve the highest possible score by hitting various bumpers and targets while utilizing special devices such as moveable ball launchers and magnets. Across four distinct tables featuring themes like baseball and the deep sea, the player attempts to accomplish table-specific aims, score home runs, fire the pinball out of a moving cannon, and control animated characters on the display board using the flipper buttons to earn scoring bonuses. The player has five balls per game, which can't be adjusted.

The game could be set to 480x640 resolution for a vertical playfield when a monitor was on its side.

== Development ==
Absolute Pinball was developed by Unique Development Studios, a company founded in 1994. Development on Absolute Pinball started the same year, and a publishing deal for the game signed with 21st Century Entertainment in May 1996.

The game uses updated versions of three tables released for Obsession, replacing "X-ile Zone" with a Hollywood themed table called "The Dream Factory" for the fourth table. The dot-matrix display was enhanced from that used in the earlier game.

== Reception ==
Reception

Review scores
Publication	Score
PC Games	75%
PC Joker	55%
PC Action	63%
Pelit	85%
Power Play	54%
Software Gids	33/50

Games Domain called Absolute Pinball an addictive challenge. A graphical technique used to render clear ramps was praised.

Pelit praised the variety of the tables, with the ball movement smooth, although without the subtle feel of Pro Pinball: The Web.

Software Gids found that using the 480x640 display mode the quality of the colours suffered due to limitations in available graphic cards. While the game was described as 'decent', it was found to lag behind competitors and the launch price was called ridiculous.
