= Analogue Nt Mini =

Home video game console

- Manufacturer: Analogue
- Type: Home video game console
- Released: January 23, 2017
- Introductory price: $449.99
- Discontinued: 2020
- Media: Game cartridges, SD card
- CPU: Altera Cyclone V
- Display: HDMI (1080p, 720p, 480p), Analog (RGB, Component, S-video & composite)
- Sound: 48kHz, 16-bit, digital and analog
- Connectivity: NES-style controller ports (4), USB, Famicom expansion port, Famicom microphone input, HDMI output, Analog video output, Analog audio output (RCA)
- Current firmware: 2.3 as of December 12, 2021; 4 years ago
- Predecessor: Analogue Nt
- Website: www.analogue.co/nt-mini

The Analogue Nt Mini is a video game console designed and manufactured by Analogue. It was designed to play games for the Nintendo Entertainment System and the Famicom, like the original Analogue Nt. Unlike the former, the Nt Mini uses an FPGA for processing.

== History ==
The Analogue Nt Mini was announced in August 2016.

The system cost $449.99 at launch, with the first consoles being shipped on January 23, 2017. Further units were shipped in September 2017.

The final production run of the Analogue Nt Mini, restyled the Analogue Nt Mini Noir Edition occurred in 2020. Delays in shipping this edition led this console to notably experience a significant increase in price in the European Union due to a larger trade dispute later in 2020. The 2020 Nt Mini Noir uses more advanced FPGA hardware than the 2017 Nt Mini and the Nt Mini Noir's firmware is not backwards compatible with the Nt Mini.

== Hardware ==
The Nt Mini uses an Altera Cyclone V FPGA processor. Kevin Horton was the lead developer in programming the FPGA.

The Nt Mini features a 1080p HDMI, analog video (RGB, Component, S-Video, & Composite), analog audio (48 kHz 16-bit), four original NES-style controller ports, a Famicom expansion port, and a Famicom microphone input. It has two cartridge slots, one for NES cartridges and another for Famicom cartridges. The Nt Mini is compatible with most NES expansion peripherals like the NES Zapper Light Gun, R.O.B. and the Power Pad. It is also compatible with Famicom expansion devices like the Famicom Disk System and Datach Joint ROM System. Like its predecessor, the Nt Mini's enclosure is made of an aluminum alloy uni-body enclosure manufactured from 6061 aluminum.

Game selection occurs via cartridge or, through "jailbreak" firmware by an SD card slot. New firmware can also be loaded using the SD card slot. "Jailbreak" firmware allows for loading games through ROMs and also allows the Nt Mini to simulate other systems such as Game Boy, Game Boy Color, Master System, Game Gear, ColecoVision, Atari 2600, Atari 7800, Fairchild Channel F, Magnavox Odyssey 2, Watara Supervision, Gamate, GameKing, Entex Adventure Vision, Arcadia 2001, Mega Duck, RCA Studio II, VTech CreatiVision and VideoBrain Family Computer. The Nt Mini Noir's jailbreak firmware additionally supports the Famicom Disk System, Nintendo VS. System, Intellivision, Genesis and adds an SPC player and a Mandelbrot set viewer.
