= Pinball Illusions =

1995 video game

- Developer: Digital Illusions CE
- Publisher: 21st Century Entertainment
- Programmer: Andreas Axelsson
- Artist: Markus Nyström
- Composer: Olof Gustafsson
- Platforms: Amiga 1200 / 4000, Amiga CD32, MS-DOS
- Release: October 1, 1995
- Genre: Pinball
- Mode: Single-player

Pinball Illusions is a pinball video game developed by Digital Illusions CE (DICE) and published by 21st Century Entertainment in 1995 for the Amiga and MS-DOS. It is a sequel to DICE's Pinball Dreams and Pinball Fantasies. A remake of Pinball Illusions with 3D graphics was released in 1996 as True Pinball.

The Amiga version features three pinball tables, while the CD-ROM release for MS-DOS featured a fourth table, higher resolution, and redbook audio.

== Gameplay ==
Players can choose between playing with 3 or 5 balls, adjust the slope of the table, the maximum number of multiballs allowed, and the number of nudges before tilting. One of the views shows players the entire table on screen.

The LED-style display includes animations such as coppers chasing robbers.

=== Tables ===
"Law n'Justice" is based on police in a future city. "Babewatch" is based on performing a variety of tasks to attract women, and includes a jukebox with a choice of music. "Extreme Sports" includes bungee jumping, free-fall, cliff-diving, and off-piste. "The Vikings" involves collecting various Viking themed objects, and the Norse Gods Odin and Wotan.

== Development ==
As with prior pinball games developed by DICE, Pinball Dreams and Pinball Fantasies, the game was designed to have four tables, but The Vikings was unfinished for the Amiga versions and only appears in the PC CD-ROM version. This is the only one of DICE's three pinball games to require an AGA chipset, supporting 256 colours. The PC version had support for 800x600 resolution with the floppy disk release otherwise similar to the Amiga version. The CD-ROM release in addition to having the fourth table uses redbook audio instead of the MOD music in the other versions. Unlike the two earlier games, it features multiball.

It also had a later 1996 MS-DOS release as one of five games in the Pinball Gold compilation.

== Reception ==
Reception

Review scores
Publication	Score
PC Gamer	87%
Pelit	91%
Amiga Power	89%
PC Power	90%

PC Gamer said "The four tables may not be enough variety for some gamers, but this is as good as pinball gets on the PC -- and you don't need quarters, so you won't even have to take a hammer to your piggy bank" Maximum scored the PC version three out of five stars. They said the four tables are "all excellent in their own way" but that the game lacks the imagination and innovation of other pinball video games. They concluded it to be "solid, if uninspiring, entertainment." Amiga Power enjoyed the multiballs and all three tables, although disliked the music on Extreme Sports. PC Power found the graphics to be immaculate and the ball behaved realistically, with the tables "fiendishly addictive".

The game was ranked the 23rd best game of all time by Amiga Power in 1996.

== True Pinball ==
The same four tables were used for True Pinball which released in 1996 on the Sega Saturn and PlayStation.
