= DICE (company) =

Swedish video game developer owned by Electronic Arts

EA Digital Illusions CE AB
- Logo used since 2006

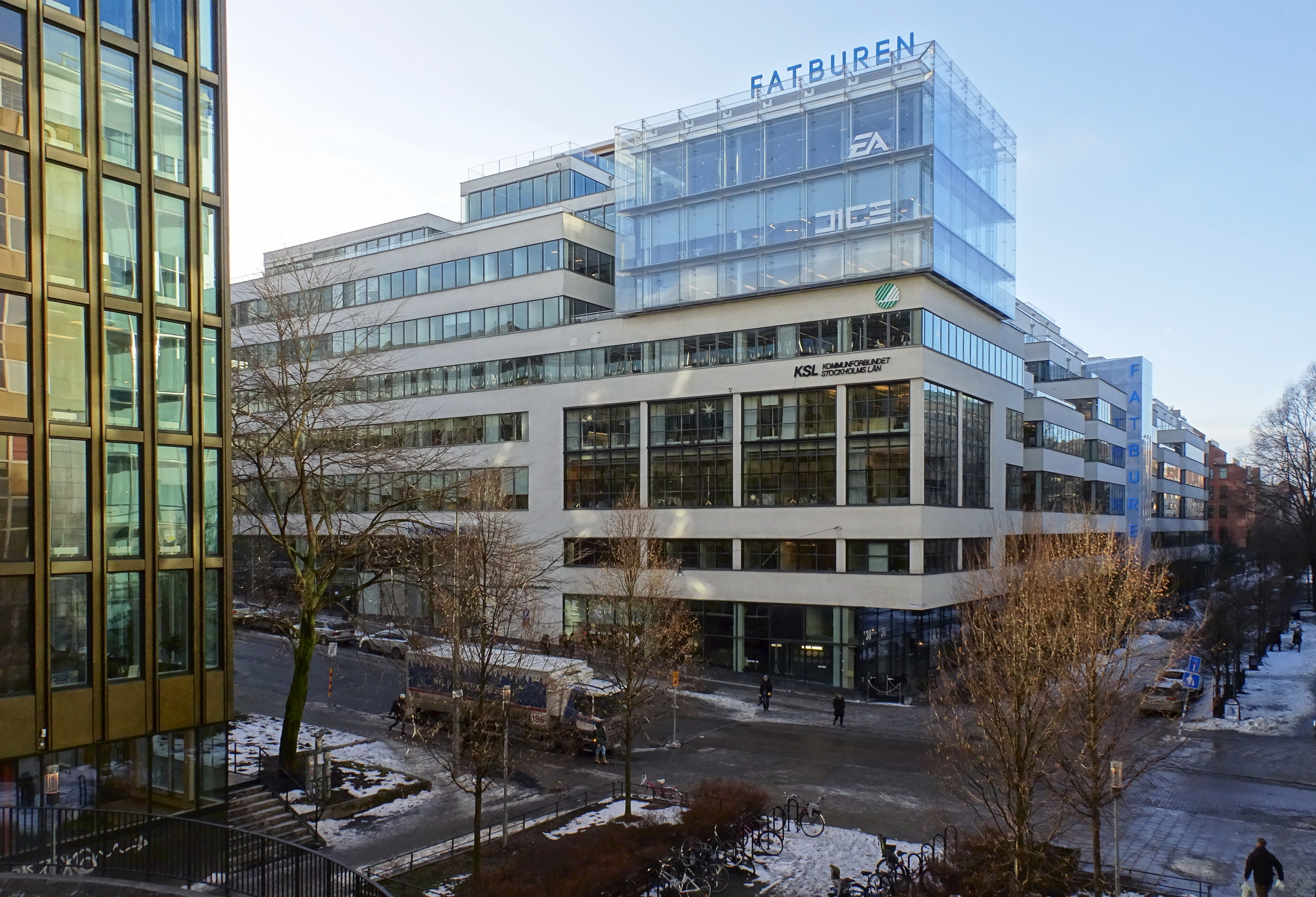
- Headquarters in Stockholm
- Trade name: DICE
- Formerly: Digital Illusions HB (1992–1993); Digital Illusions CE AB (1993–2006)
- Type: Subsidiary
- Industry: Video games
- Founded: May 1992; 34 years ago, in Växjö, Sweden
- Founders: Olof Gustafsson; Markus Nyström; Fredrik Liljegren; Andreas Axelsson
- Headquarters: Stockholm, Sweden
- Key people: Rebecka Coutaz (general manager)
- Products: Games; Battlefield series (2002-present); Mirror's Edge series (2008-2016); Star Wars Battlefront series (2013-2017); Game engines; Frostbite
- Number of employees: 714 (2020)
- Parent: Electronic Arts (2006–present)
- Divisions: Frostbite Labs
- Website: dice.se

EA Digital Illusions CE AB (trade name: DICE) is a Swedish video game developer based in Stockholm. The company was founded in 1992 and has been a subsidiary of Electronic Arts since 2006. Its releases include the Battlefield, Mirror's Edge and Star Wars: Battlefront series. Through its Frostbite Labs division, the company also develops the Frostbite game engine.

== History ==
=== Foundation and early years (1992–2000) ===
Digital Illusions was founded in May 1992 by Olof "Olle" Gustafsson, Markus Nyström, Fredrik Liljegren and Andreas Axelsson, four friends and former members of The Silents, a demogroup that developed for Amiga systems. The four studied at Växjö University, thus DICE was established in Växjö.

=== Expansion (2000–2004) ===
In 2000, DICE acquired developer Refraction Games (developers of Codename Eagle). From the acquisition, DICE inherited the in-development Battlefield 1942. Patrick Söderlund, who had founded Refraction Games in 1997, subsequently joined DICE as chief executive officer. This was followed with the merger of Sandbox Studios in April 2001. Sandbox Studios added 50 employees to DICE's staff, amounting to 150 total employees, with the studio being renamed as Digital Illusions Canada. In September 2004, DICE also merged with Trauma Studios in New York City. Trauma Studios employed nine people at the time.

=== Acquisition by Electronic Arts (2006–present) ===
In November 2004, Electronic Arts (EA) announced its intent to purchase all outstanding shares in DICE at a price of 61 kr per share, with the deal's closing deadline scheduled for 27 December. At the time, EA owned 18.9% in DICE. Initially, the offer was rejected by shareholders representing 28% of DICE's ownership on 15 December, after which EA adjusted its offer on 20 December, intending to only purchase 44.5% at the same price per share, extending the offer deadline to 20 January 2005. On 25 January 2005, shareholders agreed to the acquisition, and EA raised its ownership in DICE to 59.8%.

In March 2006, EA announced a new plan to acquire all outstanding shares in DICE for 67.50 kr per share. The acquisition was completed on 2 October, with 2.6 million shares in DICE transferred to EA in exchange for a total of 175.5 million kr. Shortly following the acquisition, on 5 October, EA closed Digital Illusions Canada, DICE's Ontario-based studio. The 25 employees working at the studio at the time were given the option to transfer to DICE's headquarters in Stockholm or any other EA studio. DICE co-founder Liljegren announced on 16 October that he established RedJade as a successor to Digital Illusions Canada.

In May 2013, EA opened a new Los Angeles-based division for DICE known as DICE LA, helmed by former senior staff of EA's previously closed studio Danger Close Games. DICE LA had generally been involved with support of DICE and other EA games and had not generated any title on its own. Vince Zampella of Respawn Entertainment (another EA studio) was named as the studio's new lead in January 2020. Zampella had indicated at this time that it would likely become separate from DICE, and change its name to reflect this. DICE LA announced its new name, Ripple Effect Studios, in July 2021, but otherwise under management by Zampella, and while it will finish work on Battlefield 2042, will move in a new direction following its release.

On 2 December 2021, Electronic Arts announced that Vince Zampella, co-founder of Respawn Entertainment and head of Ripple Effect Studios, will oversee the Battlefield series going forward, with Ripple Effect leading the way in developing the franchise's "new experiences", instead of DICE. Along with the announcement, it was reported that DICE General Manager Oskar Gabrielson would be leaving EA, with Rebecka Coutaz, formerly Managing Director of Ubisoft Annecy, taking his place in the role.

== Games developed ==
| Year | Title | Platform(s) |
|---|---|---|
| 1992 | Pinball Dreams | Amiga |
| 1992 | Pinball Fantasies | Amiga, Amiga CD32 |
| 1993 | Amiganoid | Amiga |
| 1994 | Benefactor | Amiga, Amiga CD32 |
| 1995 | Pinball Illusions | Amiga, Amiga CD32, MS-DOS |
| 1997 | True Pinball | PlayStation, Sega Saturn |
| 1997 | S40 Racing | Microsoft Windows |
| 1998 | Motorhead | Microsoft Windows, PlayStation |
| 1999 | Swedish Touring Car Championship | Microsoft Windows |
| 2000 | Swedish Touring Car Championship 2 | Microsoft Windows |
| 2000 | Riding Champion: Legacy of Rosemond Hill | Microsoft Windows |
| 2000 | Michelin Rally Masters: Race of Champions | Microsoft Windows, PlayStation |
| 2000 | NASCAR Heat | PlayStation |
| 2002 | RalliSport Challenge | Microsoft Windows, Xbox |
| 2002 | Battlefield 1942 | macOS, Microsoft Windows |
| 2002 | V8 Challenge | Microsoft Windows |
| 2003 | Battlefield 1942: The Road to Rome | macOS, Microsoft Windows |
| 2003 | Midtown Madness 3 | Xbox |
| 2003 | Battlefield 1942: Secret Weapons of WWII | macOS, Microsoft Windows |
| 2004 | RalliSport Challenge 2 | Xbox |
| 2005 | Battlefield 2 | Microsoft Windows |
| 2005 | Battlefield 2: Modern Combat | PlayStation 2, Xbox, Xbox 360 |
| 2006 | Battlefield 2142 | macOS, Microsoft Windows |
| 2008 | Battlefield: Bad Company | PlayStation 3, Xbox 360 |
| 2008 | Mirror's Edge | Microsoft Windows, PlayStation 3, Xbox 360 |
| 2009 | Battlefield Heroes | Microsoft Windows |
| 2009 | Battlefield 1943 | PlayStation 3, Xbox 360 |
| 2010 | Battlefield: Bad Company 2 | iOS, Microsoft Windows, PlayStation 3, Xbox 360 |
| 2010 | Need for Speed: Hot Pursuit | Android, iOS, Microsoft Windows, PlayStation 3, Wii, Windows Phone, Xbox 360 |
| 2010 | Battlefield Online | Microsoft Windows |
| 2010 | Medal of Honor | Microsoft Windows, PlayStation 3, Xbox 360 |
| 2011 | Battlefield Play4Free | Microsoft Windows |
| 2011 | Battlefield 3 | iOS, Microsoft Windows, PlayStation 3, Xbox 360 |
| 2013 | Battlefield 4 | Microsoft Windows, PlayStation 3, PlayStation 4, Xbox 360, Xbox One |
| 2015 | Battlefield: Hardline | Microsoft Windows, PlayStation 3, PlayStation 4, Xbox 360, Xbox One |
| 2015 | Star Wars Battlefront | Microsoft Windows, PlayStation 4, Xbox One |
| 2016 | Mirror's Edge Catalyst | Microsoft Windows, PlayStation 4, Xbox One |
| 2016 | Battlefield 1 | Microsoft Windows, PlayStation 4, Xbox One |
| 2017 | Star Wars Battlefront II | Microsoft Windows, PlayStation 4, Xbox One |
| 2018 | Battlefield V | Microsoft Windows, PlayStation 4, Xbox One |
| 2019 | Ultracore | Mega Sg, Nintendo Switch, PlayStation 4, PlayStation Vita, Xbox One, Xbox Series X/S |
| 2021 | Battlefield 2042 | Microsoft Windows, PlayStation 4, PlayStation 5, Xbox One, Xbox Series X/S |
| 2025 | Battlefield 6 | Microsoft Windows, PlayStation 5, Xbox Series X/S |

== Notes ==
1. Co-developed with Easy Studios
2. Co-developed with Criterion Games
3. Co-developed with Neowiz Games
4. Co-developed with Danger Close Games
5. Co-developed with Visceral Games
6. Co-developed with Criterion Games, Motive Studio and Ripple Effect Studios, as part of Battlefield Studios
7. Cancelled in 1994 but eventually revived by Strictly Limited Games and released in 2019
