= Total Pinball 3D =

- Developer: Spidersoft
- Publisher: 21st Century Entertainment
- Platform: MS-DOS
- Release: 1996
- Genre: Pinball

Total Pinball 3D also known as Pinball 3D-VCR is a 1996 pinball video game developed by Spidersoft and published by 21st Century Entertainment. It is an updated version of Pinball Mania.

== Gameplay ==
isometric 3D view of Tarantula table

The gameplay features four pinball tables equipped with roll-overs, ramps, spinners, and drop targets, utilizing at least three flippers per table. The player navigates multi-ball action—including a practice mode—utilizes adjustable table angles to alter ball speed, and can access an instant replay feature and a statistics tracking package to monitor performance. Multiball modes feature up to ten balls, with an option to reduce the number for lower powered PC's.

A fixed isometric view is used, with an optional scrolling 2D view.

A demo version with only the "Tarantula" table was available.

== Development ==
The game is one of a series of pinball games Spidersoft developed for 21st Century Entertainment.

The game reuses the four tables developed for Spidersoft's 1995 game Pinball Mania. 3D rendered versions of these tables was added, with the 2D view remaining as an option. The game released as Pinball 3D-VCR, but called Total Pinball 3D in the United States. The "VCR" in the name refers to the ability to record games and play them back.

The tables reappeared in third-party games Platinum Pinball and Pinball Advance, with Spidersoft rearranging the "Jackpot" table to use in Expert Pinball 4000.

== Reception ==
Reception

Review scores
Publication	Score
Computer Game Review	84%
GameSpot	5.8/10
Next Generation	2/5
PC Zone	58%
Software Gids	25/50

GameSpot found that Total Pinball 3D doesn’t really bring anything new to the table. Computer Game Review recommended Total Pinball 3D to anyone who's really serious about their pinball game. CGW praised the concept of the game, but criticized the implementation with uninspiring table designs. PC Zone found the playback feature "pointless".

Next Generation found little to distinguish the game from its competitors, with only the 3D mode worth using.

Software Gids found the speed of the ball could depend on hardware configuration.
