= True Pinball =

1996 video game

- North American Sega Saturn cover art
- Developer: Digital Illusions
- Publisher: Ocean Software
- Platforms: PlayStation, Sega Saturn
- Release: EU: April 5, 1996; NA: October 31, 1996 (Sega Saturn Only)
- Genre: Pinball
- Modes: Single-player, multiplayer

True Pinball is a video game developed by Digital Illusions and published by Ocean for the PlayStation and Sega Saturn in 1996. It is an enhanced version of Pinball Illusions.

== Gameplay ==
True Pinball is a pinball game with four pinball tables. They are the same ones featured in the later versions of Illusions, but with improved visuals and audio. Each table has been recreated in 3D and can be played either at an angle or from a top-down view.

== Reception ==
Reception

Review scores
Publication	Score
AllGame	4/5 (PS)
Mean Machines Sega	85% (Saturn)
Electronic Gaming Monthly	7/10 (Saturn)
Next Generation	3/5 (Saturn)

Next Generation reviewed the Saturn version of the game, rating it three stars out of five, and stated that "True Pinball is a good video pinball game, just not a great game of pinball."

Mean Machines Sega gave the Saturn version of True Pinball an overall score of 85%, expressing that it "requires skill" and is a better pinball game than Digital Pinball: Last Gladiators, further stating that it emulates the 'look and feel' of a real pinball machine. Electronic Gaming Monthly's four-person review crew gave the Saturn version of the game an overall score of seven out of ten, praising its "hi-res" graphics, and like Mean Machines Sega, EGM expressed that it emulates the 'look and feel' of a real pinball machine, with one reviewer stating that True Pinball is "as close to true pinball as can be".
