= Motorhead (video game) =

1998 video game

- European PlayStation box art
- Developer: Digital Illusions CE AB
- Publishers: EU: Gremlin Interactive; NA: Fox Interactive
- Platforms: PlayStation, Microsoft Windows
- Release: PlayStation: EU: April 1998; NA: 12 November 1998; Windows: EU: October 1998; NA: 3 March 1999
- Genre: Racing
- Modes: Single-player, multiplayer

Motorhead: High Velocity Entertainment is a racing video game developed by Digital Illusions CE AB for PlayStation and Microsoft Windows. The game was published in Europe by Gremlin Interactive, and in North America by Fox Interactive.

== Gameplay ==
Motorhead is a futuristic racing video game. It features eight circuits and ten cars for players to select from.

== Reception ==
Reception

Aggregate score
Aggregator	Score	
Aggregator	PC	PS
GameRankings	71%	65%

Review scores
Publication	Score	
Publication	PC	PS
CNET Gamecenter	7/10	4/10
Computer Games Strategy Plus	2/5	N/A
Edge	N/A	7/10
Electronic Gaming Monthly	N/A	5.625/10
Game Informer	N/A	6.25/10
GamePro	1.5/5 (Note: GamePro gave the PC version 4/5 for graphics, 2/5 for sound, 3/5 for control, and 1.5/5 for overall fun factor.)	2.5/5 (Note: GamePro gave the PlayStation version 4.5/5 for graphics, 2/5 for sound, 3.5/5 for control, and 2.5/5 for overall fun factor.)
GameSpot	7.9/10	6.2/10
IGN	6/10	5/10
Official U.S. PlayStation Magazine	N/A	3.5/5
PC Accelerator	6/10	N/A
PC Gamer (US)	88%	N/A
The Cincinnati Enquirer	2/4	N/A

The PC version received above-average reviews, while the PlayStation version received mixed reviews, according to the review aggregation website GameRankings. Edge described the latter version as "something of an enigma, existing somewhere between Wipeout and Ridge Racer." The magazine praised its distinctive setting and addictive gameplay, but criticized its difficulty and short number of tracks. Chris Gregson of GameSpot said of the PC version, "If you like pure speed seasoned with good graphics, this is one you definitely don't want to miss." PC Accelerator gave the European import a mixed review, while PC Gamer gave it a favourable review, many months before it was released Stateside.
