= 8BitDo =

Chinese peripheral manufacturer

- Company type: Private
- Industry: Video game accessories; Computer peripherals
- Founded: July 15, 2013; 12 years ago in Shenzhen, China
- Website: 8bitdo.com

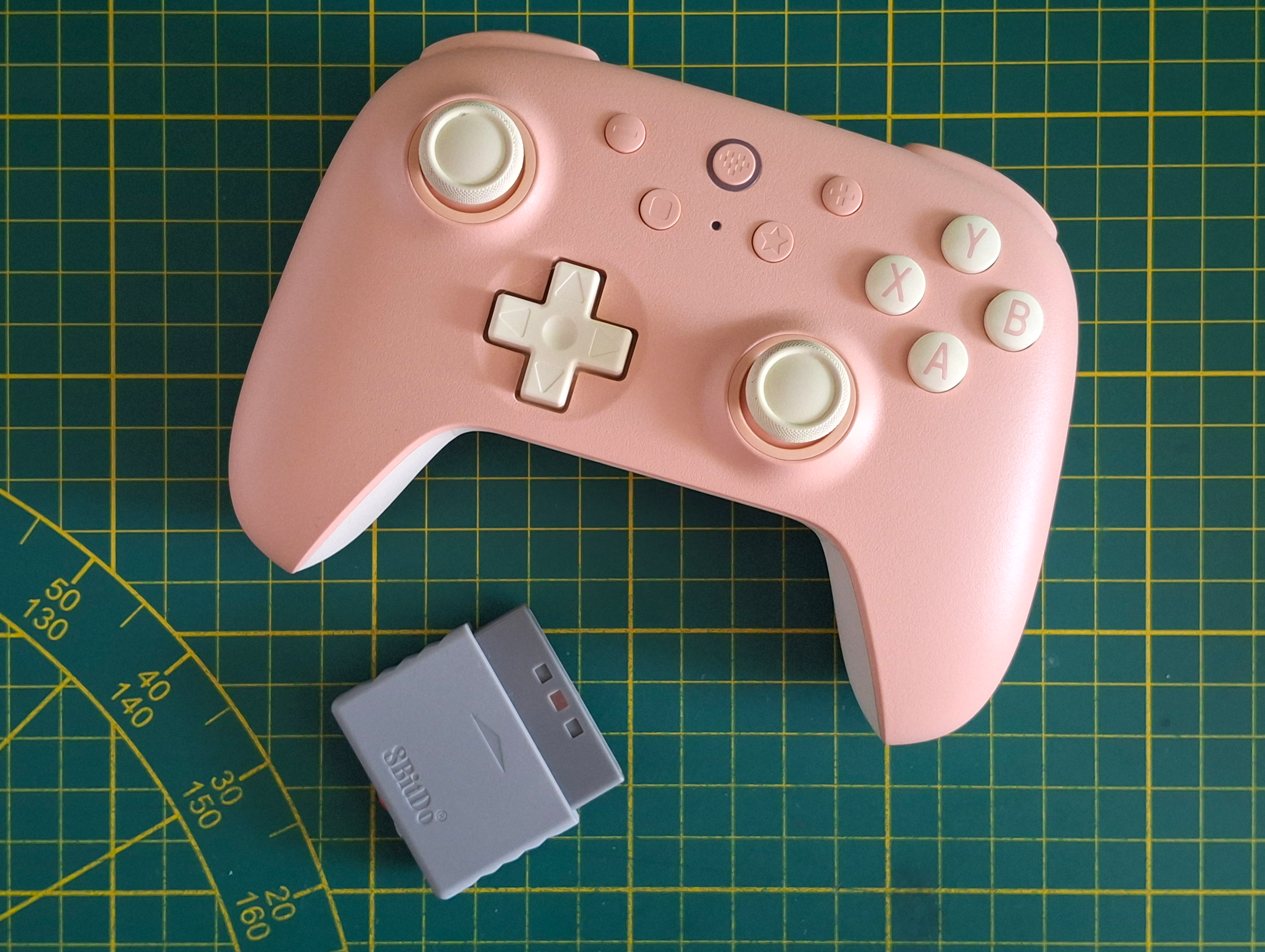
An 8BitDo Ultimate 2C Wireless Controller and wireless receiver for the PlayStation 1 & 2

8BitDo is a peripheral manufacturer based in China that specializes in video game accessories. The company is largely known for its Ultimate and Pro lines of controllers. It also manufactures desktop computer and smartphone peripherals, including keyboards, mice, and speakers. Many 8BitDo product designs are inspired by retro video game consoles, such as the NES. It has also released several officially licensed Xbox branded products.
