= Psycho Pinball =

1994 pinball video game

- Developer: Codemasters
- Publisher: Codemasters
- Platforms: Mega Drive, MS-DOS, Windows
- Release: November 25, 1994: Mega Drive; 1995: MS-DOS
- Genre: Pinball
- Modes: Single-player, multiplayer

Psycho Pinball is a 1994 pinball video game published and developed by Codemasters, released for Mega Drive in the United Kingdom and MS-DOS in the United States and Europe.

== Gameplay ==
There are four differently themed tables: Wild West (American Old West), Trick or Treat (Halloween), The Abyss (Caribbean underwater), and Psycho (an amusement park). While the first three are normal tables, Psycho broke new ground; it is connected to the others by activating certain jumpers, then launching the ball into one of the tents. The ball continues on the other table, returning to drop from the tent in Psycho when it drains. It is also the only one with a spring ball launcher and no multiball (presumably because of the potential for one of the balls to transition between tables).

Wild West is an open table with few obstacles; this makes it difficult to achieve high scores, unlike Trick or Treat, that is a much more enclosed table and has more ramp multipliers. The Abyss is the only one with two levels of play, and the multiball is usually reduced to two balls. To activate the multiball, the player has to trap a ball in one of the vent holes, and then knock it out of its trajectory when it is being thrown from one vent to another. It is possible, but tricky, to trap additional balls in the vents to use in the multiball.

=== Minigames ===
One of its main features is minigames on each table. They range from simple panel games to full arcade sequences, all activated by hitting certain triggers, and then sending the ball to a particular location on the table. Panel games include Blackjack in Wild West; Spook Shoot (the player has to hit 20 ghosts which appear in three positions, corresponding to the three joypad buttons, or two flippers and a tilt on the PC) on Trick or Treat; Cup Confusion on Psycho (a shell game to find the letter P under one of three moving cups); or Fast Fishing (pressing the C button when fish pass by) in The Abyss.

The arcade minigames are much more elaborate and require more effort. The player is in direct control of Psycho, an armadillo, and must reach the bonus plaque.

- Runaway Train (in Wild West): Psycho is at the end of a hijacked train and has to reach the locomotive, dodging through signs, water tanks, gunmen, and tunnels. If Psycho falls, gets trapped when climbing a ladder on the left side of the screen, or is hit by an obstacle or a bullet, no bonus is awarded.
- Moonsquares (in Psycho): Psycho must travel from one rocket to another using disappearing platforms. There is a 5x5 grid composed of platforms that disappear. If Psycho falls, the bonus is progressively reduced until it boots Psycho back to the table.
- Whale's Belly (in The Abyss): Psycho is trapped inside a whale along with three buoys and an endless supply of crabs. Psycho must capture the crabs and throw them into the whales' ulcers, which eventually pop up and fill its stomach with water and rise. Psycho dies if he takes too much time (which makes the whale burp) or falls into the water.

The Trick or Treat table does not have such an arcade minigame, although early magazine previews show a minigame with brooms that never made the final game.

In the PC version there are three different games (activated in a practically identical manner):

- Dodge the Express (Wild West): Psycho must avoid a series of oncoming trains.
- Strong Arm (Psycho): A button masher event to arm wrestle against a circus strongman.
- Blubber Belly (The Abyss): stop a selector for one of five game features (extra balls, instant activation of modes, etc.).

It also adds Big Deal, a higher-or-lower card game, to the casino in Wild West (alternating with Blackjack).

== Reception ==
Reception

Review scores
Publication	Score
GamesMaster	SMD: 90%
Mean Machines	SMD: 86%
Pelit	82%
Software Gids	35/50

Reviewing the Mega Drive version, Mean Machines found the scrolling to be faultless, and the graphics to be crisp. GamesMaster found the game to be addictive and fun.

Reviewing the DOS version, CNET found the game had good ball control, but disliked that only a third of a table could be seen on-screen. Software Gids found the music and sound effects to be poor, though still called it a solid choice due to its excellent ball physics and attractive price point. Pelit praised the ability to warp from one table to another.
