= Super Nt =

Home video game console by Analogue

Analogue Super Nt
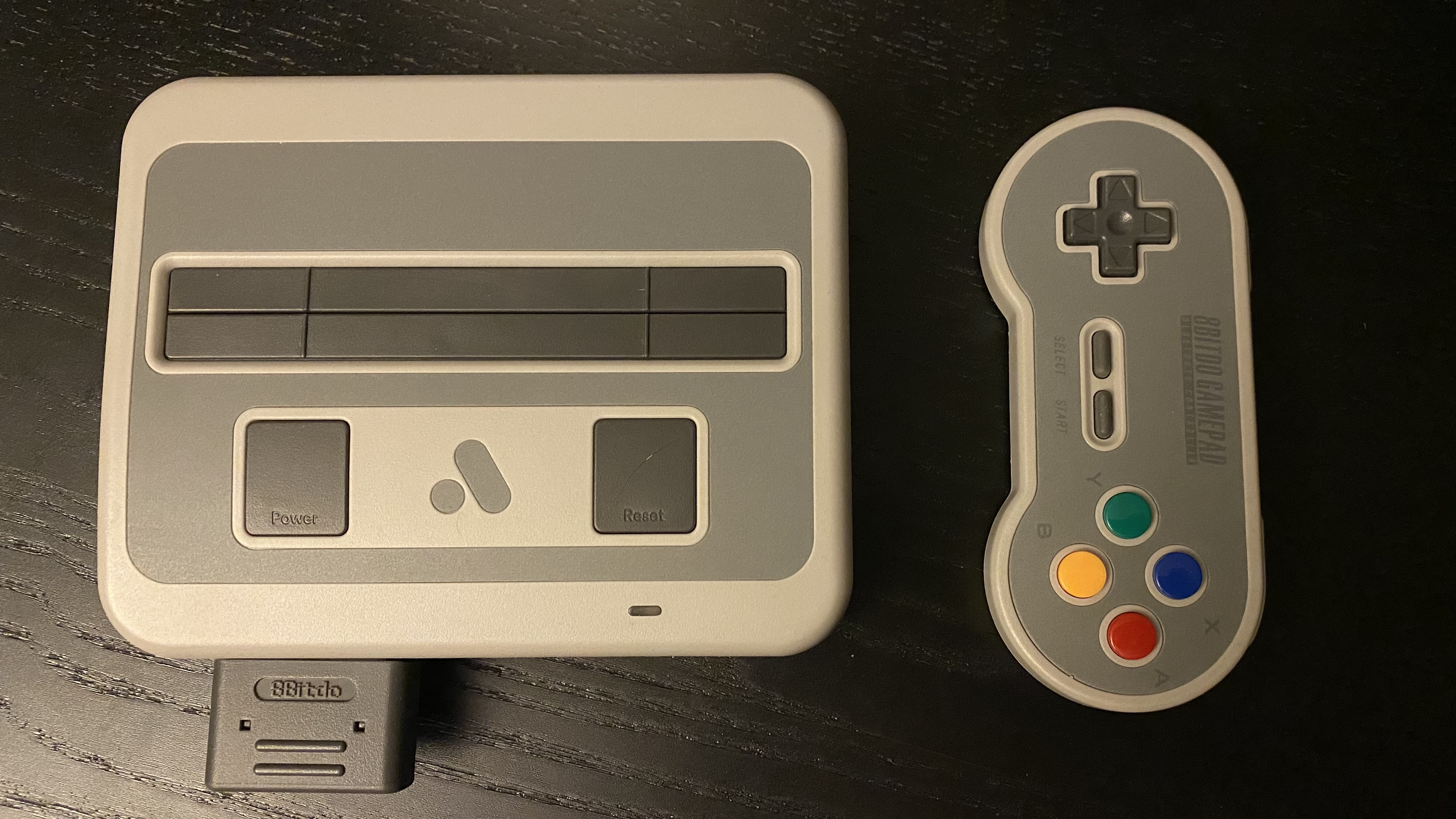
- A Super Nt next to an 8Bitdo SN30 gamepad
- Manufacturer: Analogue
- Product family: Analogue Nt
- Type: Home video game console
- Released: February 7, 2018
- Lifespan: 2018–2022, 2026-Present
- Introductory price: $190
- Media: Game cartridges, SD card
- CPU: Altera Cyclone V
- Display: HDMI (1080p, 720p, 480p) at 60 Hz
- Sound: 48kHz, 16-bit, digital over HDMI
- Connectivity: SNES & SFC controller ports (2), HDMI output, Micro USB input (power only), SD card (firmware update)
- Dimensions: 6.6 by 5.2 by 1.6 inches (168 mm × 132 mm × 41 mm)
- Website: www.analogue.co

The Analogue Super Nt is an FPGA-based home video game console designed and manufactured by Analogue, designed to be compatible with games for the Super Nintendo Entertainment System.

== Features ==
=== Hardware and software ===
The Super Nt uses an Altera Cyclone V processor, and features 1080p HDMI output, digital audio (48 kHz 16-bit).

Phil Fish, the designer of Fez, designed the Super Nt's user interface. Squarepusher composed the audio to the system's startup.

==== Super Turrican - Director's Cut & Super Turrican 2 ====
Super Turrican Director's Cut and the original Super Turrican 2 are included pre-installed with the Super Nt. Super Turrican - Director's Cut is a version of Super Turrican that includes additional content that was not available on the original Super NES version due to the limited capacity of the Mask ROM used at the time.

=== Design ===
The design of the Super Nt console is similar to that of the Super Famicom console and the European and Korean Super NES control deck. The console features an HDMI port for video output, a micro USB port for power, an SD card port for firmware updates, a cartridge port compatible with Super NES and Super Famicom cartridges, and controller ports compatible with accessories designed for the Super NES, including the original controllers. The console does not include a controller, requiring a separate purchase.

Unlike previous Analogue products, the Super Nt's enclosure is manufactured from ABS plastic to streamline manufacturing and reduce costs. The console measures 6.6 by 5.2 by 1.6 inches (168 mm × 132 mm × 41 mm).

The Super Nt was originally released in four variants: Black, Classic (modeled after the North American Super NES), SF (modeled the Super Famicom and the European Super NES) and Transparent. A limited edition fifth variant in white (in collaboration with Ghostly International and limited to 1000 units) was released on December 3, 2018.

== Reception ==
The Analogue Super Nt was released on February 7, 2018 to critical acclaim. Forbes called it "the new benchmark for all retro consoles". Tom's Guide and PCMag gave it an Editor's Choice Award. Wired Magazine gave it a 9/10 and a Wired Recommends Award.
