= Analogue Nt =

Home video game console

- Developer: Analogue
- Manufacturer: Analogue Inc.
- Type: Home video game console
- Released: 2015
- Introductory price: $499.00
- Discontinued: By July 2017
- Media: NES and Famicom cartridges
- CPU: Ricoh 2A03
- Graphics: Ricoh 2c02 PPU
- Input: 3.5mm microphone jack
- Controller input: Up to 4 NES controllers
- Dimensions: 1.7 by 9.7 by 5.7 inches (43 mm × 246 mm × 145 mm)
- Marketing target: Retro gamers
- Backward compatibility: NES and Famicom game cartridges
- Predecessor: CMVS
- Successor: Analogue Nt Mini

The Analogue Nt is a home video game console designed and manufactured by Analogue, designed to play games for the Nintendo Entertainment System.

== History ==
In March, 2014 the system was announced. Analogue began accepting pre-orders for the system on May 5, 2014.

Pre-orders began shipping in June 2015.

A limited run of 10 24 karat gold plated special edition systems were produced by April 2016, and were available for sale at a price of $4999.

In 2016 Analogue announced a followup system, the Nt Mini, a smaller model which includes RGB & HDMI output in the base model and uses an FPGA as a processor.

By July 23, 2017, the Analogue Nt had been discontinued.

== Hardware ==
Instead of software emulation or an FPGA, the original Analogue Nt uses parts sourced from damaged Famicom HVC-001 systems. In particular the system incorporates a Ricoh 2A03 CPU and an NTSC Ricoh 2c02 PPU, on a custom printed circuit board. A notable original chip which was omitted included the lockout chip used on the NES. The system was designed to be compatible with NES, Famicom, and Famicom Disk System titles.

The default model was released with RGB (RGB, Component, S-Video, Composite, VGA, and SCART) video outputs, with an additional "add-on" for 1080p HDMI output and other digital features.

The Analogue Nt's enclosure is solid aluminium unibody enclosure manufactured from 6061 aluminium in China, and assembled in the United States of America. Casing could be anodized red, blue, or black for an additional fee. The system dimensions are 1.7 by 9.7 by 5.7 inches (43 mm × 246 mm × 145 mm).

== Reception ==
The Analogue Nt received positive reviews, with critics praising performance on HD TVs, while noting an unusually high price for the system. Will Greenwald's PCMag review gave the Analogue Nt a 4/5, praising the graphical output of the system as "simply the best-looking direct feed of an NES cartridge I've ever seen.", while noting that the price of the console with HDMI output was "tough-to-swallow". Vice praised the Analogue Nt's build quality and video quality saying, "the Analogue Nt is a gorgeous machine...The Analogue Nt makes NES games look phenomenal.", while also noting that NES games may have limited appeal to gamers not nostalgic for them. CNET.com said "In an age where retro games just don't look right on modern HDTVs, the Analogue Nt is a magical piece of hardware." while noting that "At $500 the Analogue Nt is obviously not for everyone." The high price of the system was noted by many, such as Kyle Orland of Ars Technica, who noted that "it's hard to recommend to anyone besides the most committed 8-bit retro gaming addict".
