= Roger Wilco (software) =

Voice-over-IP client program

- Original author: Resounding Technology
- Developer: GameSpy
- Release: May 3, 1999; 27 years ago
- Final release: 1.4.1.6 / July 8, 2003; 23 years ago
- Operating system: Windows 9x; Windows NT
- Platform: x86
- Size: 790.7 KB (installer)
- Available in: English
- Type: Voice over IP
- Website: rogerwilco.gamespy.com (archived)

Roger Wilco is one of the first voice-over-IP client programs designed primarily for use with online multiplayer video games. Roger Wilco enabled online gamers to talk to one another through a computer headset or other audio input device instead of typing messages to each other. Within a year of the software's introduction, over 2 million online video gamers were using the application.

Roger and Wilco are procedure words which, in radiophone communication, mean "I understood your message and I will comply".

== Development and release ==
Roger Wilco was developed by a US startup company called Resounding Technology. Three of the company's four founders were roommates when they were undergraduate students at Princeton University: Adam Frankl, Tony Lovell, and Henri de Marcellus. David Lewis, who led marketing and business development, was based in Silicon Valley and was responsible for growing the Roger Wilco community and managed partnerships with video game publishers who bundled Roger Wilco with their games. Plantronics, PNY, and other game peripheral manufacturers also bundled Roger Wilco with their products.

The company began publishing pre-release versions of the software in the autumn of 1998; the first general availability release, Roger Wilco Mark I, followed in May 1999. The company distributed both the client and server as freeware. The server software, Roger Wilco Base Station, was developed for Linux, FreeBSD, Windows 9x, and Windows NT. Development of a client for Mac OS never progressed beyond the alpha phase.

David Lewis demonstrated the product's server-less voice capabilities to Mpath Interactive, a startup company in Silicon Valley, who went on to acquire Resounding Technology based on their proprietary peer-to-peer voice technology. The company IPO'd soon after and renamed it to HearMe, Inc.

In December 2000, GameSpy bought the Roger Wilco intellectual property. In early 2001, they integrated an updated version of the client software into their game server browser, GameSpy Arcade. Players could use the Roger Wilco software if they bought a subscription to GameSpy's Game Tools suite. David Lewis licensed SDK versions of the voice technology to virtually every major game publisher including Activision, EA, Microsoft, Ubisoft, and others. The licensing arrangement with Microsoft enabled the use of the Voice SDK for Microsoft's Xbox and required that all multi-player Xbox game developers included in-game voice chat capabilities. Today, virtually every leading online multiplayer game includes voicechat due to the pioneering efforts by the Resounding team.

GameSpy published the final version of the Roger Wilco client for Windows on July 8, 2003. That year, a vice president of consumer products at GameSpy Industries told The Boston Globe that Roger Wilco had about 5 million users.

== See also ==
- Comparison of VoIP software
- Mumble
- TeamSpeak
- Ventrilo
