= Homefront (video game) =

2011 video game

- Developer: Kaos Studios
- Publisher: THQ: JP: Spike
- Directors: David Broadhurst; David Votypka
- Producer: Dustin Smither
- Designer: Chris Cross
- Programmer: Wes Cumberland
- Artist: Jason Barajas
- Writers: John Milius; C.J. Kershner
- Composer: Matthew Harwood
- Series: Homefront
- Engine: Unreal Engine 3
- Platforms: Microsoft Windows; PlayStation 3; Xbox 360
- Release: NA: March 15, 2011; AU: March 17, 2011; EU: March 18, 2011
- Genre: First-person shooter
- Modes: Single-player, multiplayer

Homefront is a first-person shooter video game developed by Kaos Studios and published by THQ. The game centers around a resistance movement in the near-future fighting against a Korean occupation of the Western United States following a fictionalized WPK-lead reunification of Korea. It was released for Microsoft Windows, PlayStation 3 and Xbox 360 in March 2011.

Homefront received mixed reviews. The single-player campaign's short length was criticised, while the atmosphere and story divided critics. The game's multiplayer in contrast was generally well received. Following THQ's bankruptcy, the rights of the game were sold to Crytek and later Koch Media after restructuring their company. A reboot, Homefront: The Revolution, was released by Deep Silver in 2016.

== Gameplay ==
=== Single-player ===
The single-player campaign takes 4 to 10 hours to finish the game, all depending on the player's experience.

=== Multiplayer ===
The multiplayer component of Homefront is focused on large-scale, vehicle-based combat reminiscent of Kaos Studios' first title, Frontlines: Fuel of War. The defining innovation of Homefront's multiplayer is its battle points system, which is an in-game currency that allows a player to purchase weapons, gear, and vehicles. Players can earn points by completing objectives and increasing their number of kills, which they can spend on weapons, missiles, and drones or larger, higher-cost items like helicopters and tanks.

The multiplayer gameplay takes place in the period before the United States Armed Forces were completely scattered. Each copy of Homefront contains an online pass, granting users access to the full multiplayer experience. Although the online pass is not required to play multiplayer, those who play without an online pass will be unable to progress further than level 5 of the total 75 levels.

The online multiplayer servers were shut down on the console versions following the sale and closure of THQ in late 2013. However, there are some third-party servers still available (as of 2017) on PC.

== Plot ==
=== Setting and backstory ===
Homefront is set in a near future dystopic United States in 2027. The game's backstory dates back to the 2010s, where tensions are high between North Korea and the global powers due to the country's military aggression, including its successful nuclear weapons test and the sinking of a South Korean ship.

However, in 2013, one year after the death of North Korean Supreme Leader Kim Jong Il, his son and successor, Kim Jong Un, successfully led a peaceful reunification with South Korea leading to the birth of the Greater Korean Republic (GKR), a technological and economic global power that comprises the military strength of the North and the economic power of the South. In 2015, a war between Iran and Saudi Arabia broke out, both becoming nuclear-armed states, devastating the global oil supply, causing gas prices to skyrocket to $19.99 per gallon, and leaving many countries in debt and causing mass hysteria. This precipitates extreme economic turmoil and massive social unrest in the United States. Two years later, the U.S. military recalled much of its Pacific fleet. Japan, significantly weakened due to the diminishing of the U.S.-Japan Security Treaty, was easily conquered by the GKR a year later and annexed shortly thereafter, becoming the first GKR-occupied state.

In 2022, conditions in the United States worsened with the collapse of the financial system and an Asian bird flu epidemic that claimed six million lives; forcing the Mexican government to close their northern border. By 2024, North Korea's annexation has continued throughout Southeast Asia, including its emerging economic powers, giving the GKR an empire reminiscent of Imperial Japan's Co-Prosperity Sphere. Finally, in 2025, the Greater Korean Republic, now a major superpower, launched a supposed advanced satellite that would be a signal of peace, but is actually a secret orbital weapon that detonated a high-altitude nuclear device over the U.S., creating an electromagnetic pulse blast that wipes out much of the nation's electrical infrastructure, including parts of Canada and Mexico. In the ensuing chaos, the Korean People's Army (KPA) launches a massive amphibious invasion, starting the Korean-American War. They seize control of Hawaii and much of the U.S. Pacific Coast. Korean paratroopers are deployed over the Midwestern United States, and with the U.S. military severely crippled and scattered, launch a final offensive to take control of the remaining states. However, the Americans were able to counterattack, leaving the Eastern States free but effectively dividing the nation at the irradiated Mississippi River, with the Western States under GKR occupation, known as the New Korean Federation of Occupied America, a puppet state of the GKR.

=== Story ===
In 2027, two years after the beginning of the Korean-American War and the beginning of the occupation, Robert Jacobs, a former United States Marine Corps combat helicopter pilot, is awakened in his apartment in Montrose, Colorado and ordered to a re-education camp in Alaska. Jacobs sees that the North Korean troops have seized control of the town, taking potentially valuable residents into custody and executing resisters. However, the bus carrying Jacobs is ambushed by American resistance fighters Connor Morgan (Tom Pelphrey), a former U.S. Marine, and Rianna (Hannah Cabell), a hunting expert, who lead him to Oasis, a resistance hideout founded by former policeman Boone Karlson (Jim T. Coleman). Boone, Connor, and Rianna are aware of Jacobs's background as a pilot and recruit him to help recover fuel for the scattered U.S. military forces. Boone initiates the operation with himself, Jacobs, Connor, Rianna, and Hopper (Joel de la Fuente), a Korean-American technical expert.

The group plans to steal several tracking beacons from a school used as a labor exchange facility, with the help of their "inside man" Arnie (Scott Sowers). These beacons are to be placed on fuel trucks so they can be tracked and hijacked. However, Arnie betrays the team to protect his children, forcing the team to kill him and eliminate all camp forces. They discover a mass grave in the school's baseball field and narrowly escape Korean reinforcements by hiding among the bodies.

The rebels continue their attacks on the KPA, assaulting an occupied warehouse store, where Jacobs, Connor, and Rianna locate the trucks and plant a beacon on one of them. They return to Oasis to find that Boone and the base's inhabitants have been discovered and killed by North Korean troops. They also discover that the Korean People's Army Air and Anti-Air Force are attacking a nearby town beyond the wall as payback for the raid the night before. The group narrowly escapes with other resistance fighters by breaching the town's walls.

The team has the information that a suitable helicopter is located in a survivalist encampment in Utah. As the camp residents are violent towards North Koreans and Americans alike, the team infiltrates the camp and manages to steal the helicopter. They pursue and hijack the fuel convoy. With Jacobs providing air support, the group continues their trip to San Francisco, delivering their jet fuel to aid the U.S. military.

The U.S. Armed Forces begin their West Coast counter-offensive by trying to retake San Francisco. They launch an assault from Marin County that succeeds in retaking most of the Golden Gate Bridge with ground personnel, A.A. guns, and fighter aircraft, as U.S. Navy reinforcements arrive. Nearing the San Francisco side of the bridge, the Americans find themselves outgunned by a massive KPA battalion. Although the ground forces have captured and reprogrammed the KPA ground-based air defenses, attaining air superiority for the U.S. Air Force, the American aircraft cannot identify where to strike due to the smoke, debris and confusion. Realizing that they are at a critical turning point, Connor lights a flare and advances on foot towards the enemy convoy and orders an airstrike onto his position, sacrificing himself to ensure that American ground forces can retake the city.

The news of the successful operation is reported by European media, with the Bay Area counterattack proving to be a major turning point in America's guerrilla war against the GKR occupation. With San Francisco taken, many West Coast cities are returned to U.S. hands, and the military launches a counter-offensive to take back the occupied states. With these victories, the E.U. Defense Council schedules an emergency meeting to debate military support for the Americans.

== Development ==
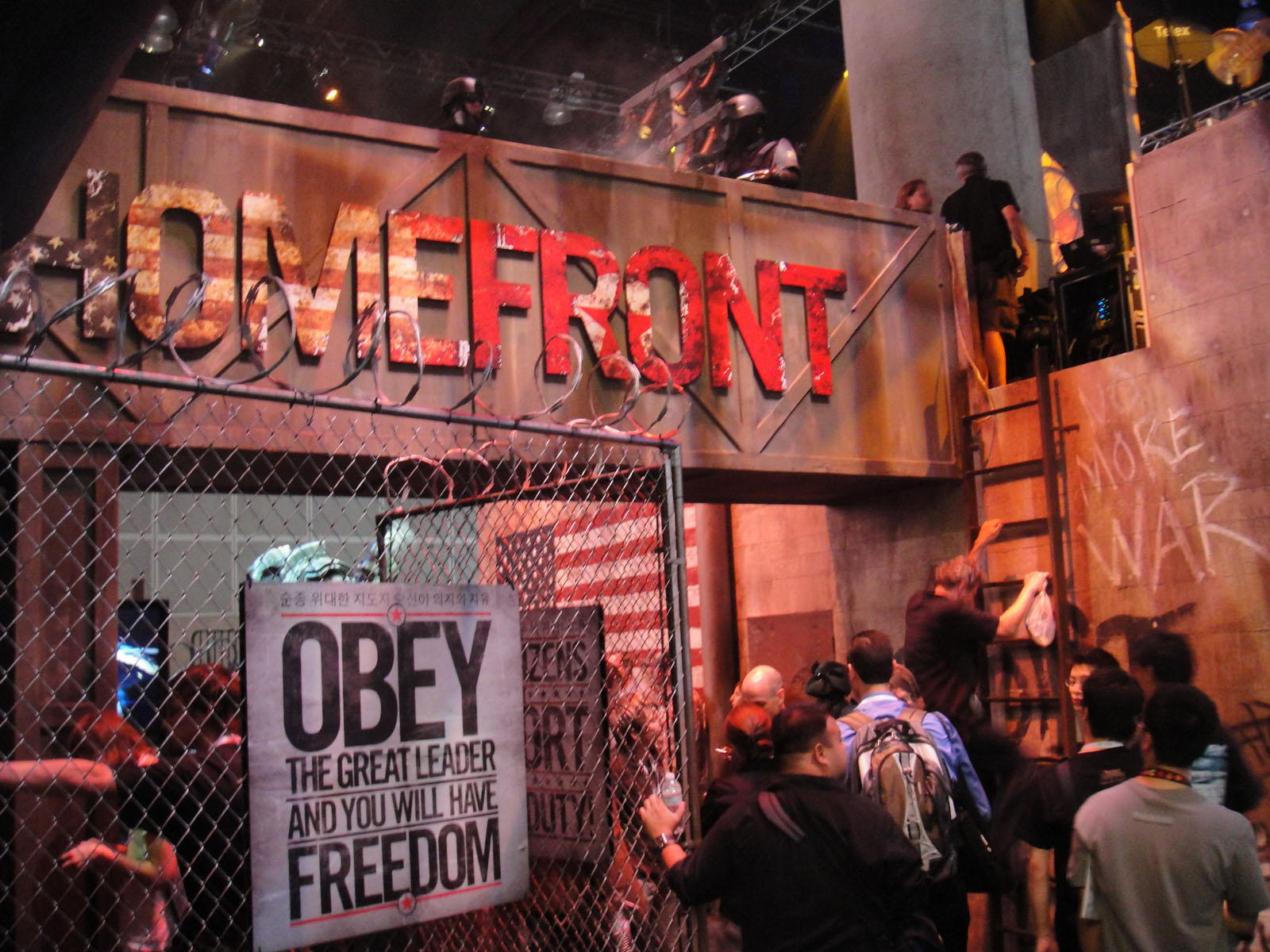
Promotion of Homefront at the 2010 Electronic Entertainment Expo

Homefront's gameplay has been completely reworked from its origins in Frontlines: Fuel of War, focusing on a more cinematic, character-driven experience. David Votypka, the design director of Homefront, said that the gameplay would be based around guerrilla-style tactics and would be inspired by Half-Life 2. The same interview asserted the surroundings were designed to establish a connection with the user by using real companies and brands. The executive producer of the PC version of Homefront, Frank Delise, stated before release that the PC version of the game would feature exclusive content and dedicated servers. Additional exclusive features include clan support, DirectX 11 graphics, and first person vehicle cockpits.

The antagonists in Homefront were originally intended to be the People's Republic of China, but were later replaced by a unified Korea for two reasons: the risk of a possible backlash by the Chinese Ministry of Culture and the reality of economic interdependence between America and China that made the Chinese "not that scary," according to Tae Kim, a former CIA field agent and consultant on the game's backstory. Kim said, "We went to a very rigorous, academic research process to make sure to not only look at North Korea's current state but to look at historical examples how things could parallel and turn events. History repeats itself. From today to the day the invasion starts in the game, if you combine everything, the odds are very very slim this becomes true. But when you look at the storyline step by step, every step is a coin flip but a plausible step. So once you get there, it's plausible. And from there the next step is plausible as well. Even though the whole thing is fictional, it comes with plausible baby steps." While the story was billed as being written by John Milius, Gamasutra reported "most former employees credit Kaos writer C.J. Kershner with Homefront's script", claiming that Milius wrote not a single word, but consulted with Kaos in the writing and direction of the story.

== Release ==
Homefront was released on March 15, 2011, in North America, March 17, 2011, in Australia, March 18, 2011, in Europe, and April 14, 2011, in Japan. The game has been released on Steam, as well as the OnLive gaming service.

=== Novel ===
THQ announced a tie-in novel, Homefront: The Voice of Freedom, written by John Milius and Raymond Benson, which follows a group of reporters making their way across America to explore the early days of the occupation. The book involves characters from the game and sets the stage for its story. The book was released ahead of the game on January 25, 2011, as part of a "vast transmedia strategy" for Homefront.

=== Soundtrack ===
The soundtrack for the game was composed by Matthew Harwood.

A promotional compilation album, titled "Homefront: Songs for the Resistance" was distributed digitally by Sumerian Records. The album features covers of protest songs and songs about war covered mostly by metalcore and deathcore bands.

Homefront: Songs for the Resistance

Soundtrack album by Various
- Released: 2011
- Genres: Metalcore, deathcore
- Length: 53:59
- Label: Sumerian

No.	Title	Artist	Length
1.	"War Ensemble" (Slayer cover)	As I Lay Dying	4:51
2.	"Fight the Power" (Public Enemy cover)	The Dillinger Escape Plan featuring Chuck D	3:57
3.	"Uprising" (Muse cover)	Iwrestledabearonce	4:16
4.	"War Pigs" (Black Sabbath cover)	The Acacia Strain	8:15
5.	"One" (Metallica cover)	Periphery	7:12
6.	"Fortunate Son" (Creedence Clearwater Revival cover)	The Ghost Inside	2:29
7.	"For What It's Worth" (Buffalo Springfield cover)	Winds of Plague	2:40
8.	"Us and Them" (Pink Floyd cover)	Misery Signals	7:41
9.	"Masters of War" (Bob Dylan cover)	Arsonists Get All the Girls	4:15
10.	"War" (Edwin Starr cover)	Oceano	3:58
11.	"Sunday Bloody Sunday" (U2 cover)	Veil of Maya	4:25
Total length:			53:59

== Reception ==
=== Critical response ===
Reception

Aggregate scores
Aggregator	Score
GameRankings	(X360) 71.70% (PS3) 69.33% (PC) 68.89%
Metacritic	70/100

Review scores
Publication	Score
1Up.com	B−
Computer and Video Games	8.6/10
Game Informer	7.0/10
GameSpot	7.0/10
GameSpy	40/100
GameZone	8/10
IGN	7/10
Official Xbox Magazine (US)	8/10
Play	69%

Homefront was met with mixed reviews across all platforms. Some critics praised the atmosphere and story, while others panned those same aspects, along with the short length of the single-player campaign. However, the multiplayer aspect of Homefront was generally well received. Review aggregator GameRankings generated a score of 71.70% for the Xbox 360 version, 69.33% for the PlayStation 3 version and 68.89% for the Microsoft Windows version. Review aggregator Metacritic generated a score of 70 out of 100 across all platforms.

Play praised Kaos studios for the different campaign mode and multiplayer, but criticized most other things. IGN praised the setting and presentation, while criticizing the short campaign. GameSpot praised some memorable moments and the well crafted multiplayer, however it criticized the short length and felt that it was too similar to other first person shooters. According to GameZone, "with a few tweaks and a fresher coat of paint, Homefront would have been outstanding, far outshining either of those titles. As is, it's still worth a playthrough, and the quality multiplayer makes an excellent alternative to your current, aging FPS of choice." 1Up.com felt that the story and the multiplayer made up for the generic single-player mode.

=== Sales ===
THQ stated that first-day sales in North America reached 375,000 copies. Homefront became the third best selling game in the US behind Pokémon Black and White. THQ announced an estimated 1 million copies sold across North America, Europe and Asia Pacific markets. As of 3 May 2011 it had shipped 2.6 million units to retail since launch.

=== Controversies ===
The advertising for Homefront simulated a declaration of war in mainstream websites and media, creating confusion amongst non-gamers. The nature and timing of the advertising created concern in the wake of the ROKS Cheonan sinking and the North Korean artillery strike on Yeonpyeong Island, causing mainstream media coverage of the advertising campaign. THQ denied that the game was developed to piggyback off the tensions on the Korean peninsula, saying that "Homefront was a work of speculative fiction, set in the year 2027. Recent real-world events on the Korean peninsula are obviously tragic and, like everyone, we hope for a swift and peaceful resolution."

For its Japanese release, Homefront was censored by removing all references to North Korea including pictures of then-North Korean leader Kim Jong Il. They are replaced by references to "A Certain Country to the North" (北の某国) and the "Northern Leader" (北の指導者). Spike, the game's Japanese/Asian publisher, justified the censorship, stating that to "use their real names would have been 'malicious' to an 'existing person' and an 'existing country.'" Spike's censorship complies with CERO's Code of Ethics. CERO bans language-related and ideology-related expressions that regard an existing individual, country, national flag, race, ethnic group, religion, ideology, or political organization as an enemy or express disdain against any of these, and that unilaterally criticize and defame any of these.

THQ released 10,000 balloons near San Francisco as a publicity stunt during the Game Developers Conference, angering local environmentalists after balloons fell into San Francisco Bay. The game was banned in South Korea because of its depiction of a unified Korea under Northern rule.

== Sequel ==
Despite mixed reviews, publisher THQ confirmed that a sequel to Homefront was in development. As developer Kaos Studios was shut down, the game was set to be developed by Crytek UK using CryEngine 3. After THQ filed for bankruptcy, Crytek acquired the rights to the franchise as a whole on January 22, 2013. Homefront: The Revolution was announced on June 2, 2014, and subsequently released in May 2016. On July 31, Koch Media acquired the rights from Crytek and the game finished development under Dambuster Studios and was published by Deep Silver.
