= All-seeing eye (disambiguation) =

The all-seeing eye or Eye of Providence is a symbol that represents the eye of God watching over humanity.

All-seeing eye may also refer to:

- All-Seeing Eye (icon), a Russian Orthodox icon

== Entertainment ==
- The All-Seeing Eye, a gamer server browser
- The All Seeing Eye, a 1966 album by Wayne Shorter
- All Seeing I, an English electronic music group
- All-Seeing Eye, a fictional device in the video game The Conduit
- All-Seeing Eyes of the Gods, fictional artificial eyes of Leonardo Watch in the manga series Blood Blockade Battlefront
- Eye of Agamotto, a fictional amulet of Doctor Strange in the Marvel Universe
- Eye of Sauron, a fictional symbol in the novel The Lord of the Rings
- Eye of Thundera, a fictional gem in Lion-O's Sword of Omens in the ThunderCats franchise

== See also ==
- The Seeing Eye, an American guide dog school
- The Seeing Eye (film), a 1951 American short documentary film
- Seeing I, a 1998 novel by Jonathan Blum and Kate Orman
