= The All-Seeing Eye =

Internet game server browser

- Original author: UDP Soft
- Developer: Yahoo!
- Initial release: June 15, 2001
- Final release: 2.6 / May 15, 2008
- Operating system: Microsoft Windows
- Available in: English
- Type: Game server browser
- License: Proprietary

The All-Seeing Eye, known to its community of users as ASE, was a game server browser designed by Finnish company UDP Soft. It was created to help online gamers find game servers. ASE took two years to develop and was introduced as shareware on June 15, 2001.

Despite UDP Soft lacking the marketing power of GameSpy, ASE's popularity grew. It was sold to Yahoo! for an undisclosed sum in September 2004.

== Yahoo! All-Seeing Eye ==
The purchase by Yahoo! was a defensive move against acquisition activity by CNet and others, and a desire on Yahoo!'s part to tap into the hard-core gaming market. At the time of the acquisition, All-Seeing Eye had over 12 million downloads, and was used by more than a million gamers per month.

Months later, XFire was the target of a Yahoo! lawsuit over an alleged patent infringement, partly because Xfire's two primary developers were previously engineers on the Yahoo! Games team, where they had authored a patent (granted to Yahoo!) on messenger-based game play notification. The legal battle was resolved in January 2006 with details of the settlement remaining unknown.

In March and April 2008 Yahoo! sent emails to ASE subscribers informing them that ASE will be discontinued as of 15 May 2008 and that a $15 refund will be issued to current subscribers.

ASE has now been officially shut down, including all of their tracking servers. All games that previously used the ASE service will no longer display server listings. Yahoo! now redirects users seeking ASE to GameSpy Arcade, which has since been shut down also.
