= Kaos Studios =

American video game developer

- Company type: Subsidiary
- Industry: Video games
- Founded: 2006; 20 years ago
- Defunct: June 13, 2011
- Fate: Dissolved
- Headquarters: New York City, U.S.
- Number of employees: 70
- Parent: THQ

Kaos Studios was an American video game developer and studio of THQ based in New York City. Founded in 2006, the company developed the first-person shooters Frontlines: Fuel of War (2008) and Homefront (2011). The studio was closed by THQ in June 2011.

== History ==
On June 7, 2005, Trauma Studios, responsible for the popular Desert Combat modification for Battlefield 1942, was shuttered by parent company (and the game's developer) Digital Illusions CE. In January 2006, the ex-Trauma team formed Kaos Studios upon joining THQ, with the new studio focusing on first-person shooter video games.

Kaos' first game, Frontlines: Fuel of War, was released in February 2008 for Microsoft Windows and Xbox 360. In March 2009, THQ announced that Kaos was recruiting for their then-upcoming game Homefront. Homefront was released on March 15, 2011 for Microsoft Windows, PlayStation 3 and Xbox 360 in North America, with the European release set a week later.

After the release of Homefront, in March 2011, THQ suffered a 26% stock drop. The large drop was speculated to be a result of Homefront's reception, which failed to meet expectations. On June 13, 2011, THQ announced the closure of Kaos Studios. In the meantime, the game's development team was transferred to THQ Montreal. It was planned that THQ Montreal would take over product development and overall creative management for the Homefront franchise. In September 2011, THQ confirmed that a sequel to Homefront was in development, but it was later announced that the game would be developed by Crytek UK instead. After THQ filed for bankruptcy in December 2012, Crytek would acquire the rights to the franchise for US$544,218 at the January 22, 2013 auction. At the auction, Ubisoft acquired THQ Montreal, with approximately 170 employees and the rights to new yet-to-be announced IP in development at the studio, for $2.5 million.

== Games developed ==
Year	Title	Platform(s)		
Year	Title	PC	PS3	X360
2008	Frontlines: Fuel of War	Yes	No	Yes
2011	Homefront	Yes	Yes	Yes

== See also ==
- 2 Dawn Games
