= Trauma Studios =

American computer game developer

- Company type: Subsidiary of Digital Illusions CE
- Industry: Video games
- Founded: 2003
- Defunct: June 7, 2005
- Successor: Kaos Studios
- Headquarters: United States
- Products: Desert Combat; Battlefield 2
- Parent: Digital Illusions CE

Trauma Studios was an American video game developer company founded in 2003. They were best known for having created Desert Combat, a mod for Battlefield 1942.

On September 1, 2004, Digital Illusions CE bought Trauma Studios which became DICE New York. Since then, they had been collaborating on creating the first-person shooter Battlefield 2, follow-up to Battlefield 1942. On June 7, 2005, Digital Illusions announced that they had shut down Trauma Studios.

In January, 2006, the team behind Trauma Studios was hired by publisher THQ to create a new internal development studio known as Kaos Studios. Their first game, Frontlines: Fuel of War, was released on February 25, 2008.
