= Online matchmaking =

Online matchmaking may refer to:

- Online dating service
- Matchmaking (video games)
