= Codename Eagle =

1999 video game

- European cover art
- Developer: Refraction Games
- Publishers: EU: Take-Two Interactive; NA: TalonSoft
- Producer: Patrick Söderlund
- Designer: Niklas Pehrson
- Programmer: Mats Dal
- Artists: Stefan Vukanovic; Rikard Hultman
- Composer: Örjan Strandberg
- Platform: Microsoft Windows
- Release: UK: November 1999; NA: 27 March 2000
- Genre: First-person shooter
- Modes: Single-player, multiplayer

Codename Eagle is a first-person shooter video game developed by Refraction Games and published by Take-Two Interactive and TalonSoft. Codename Eagle was released initially in the United Kingdom in November 1999, and later in North America in March 2000.

In 2000, DICE acquired Refraction Games and inherited the in-development Battlefield 1942. Codename Eagle is considered a spiritual predecessor to Battlefield 1942.

== Gameplay ==
Codename Eagle is an open-world first-person shooter with drivable land, air and sea vehicles. In multiplayer mode, the players can battle in one of three modes: Deathmatch, Team Deathmatch and Capture the Flag.

== Plot ==
The game is set in an alternate timeline, centered around events starting in Petrograd, Russia in 1917. World War I and the 1917 October Revolution never happened. Germany has yet to become involved with any of the other world powers. The story starts when Tsar Nicholas of the Russian Empire is betrayed by one of his closest friends, General Popov. One night, Popov sends assassins to kill the Tsar and the rest of the Royal Family to ensure that there are absolutely no living heirs to the throne of Russia. Popov would later cover up the murder by addressing the Russian people that a "terrible accident had befallen the Royal Family". The villainous general then later presents Lieutenant Oleg to the people of Russia as the "sole surviving son of Tsar Nicholas: Prince Alexander" and has Oleg crowned as the new Tsar.

Unknown to Popov, Colonel Sergei of the Army Staff somehow managed to overhear the General's plans, and he immediately rescues two children from the doomed family: the real Prince Alexander and Princess Anastasia, who earlier was "shot and left for dead, somehow managing to survive". It is unknown how Anastasia managed to still be in Russia, but Sergei arranges Dr. Meier of the famous Russian Scientific Institute to hypnotize Prince Alexander to temporarily erase his memory of his real heritage and replace it with that of a "farm boy who grew up in the countryside of England". This is a precaution to save Alexander from giving himself away as the true son of Tsar Nicholas. Meanwhile, with Oleg as a fake Tsar, General Popov, who is hell-bent on world domination, manages to take over almost all of Europe, throwing the continent into a bloody war. Soon, all free nations of the world form an alliance known as "Shadow Command" to rebel against the evil might of the Russian Empire.

Ten years later, in 1927, Prince Alexander (with his temporary memory) has grown up to become "Agent Red" of Shadow Command, and he is assigned the most difficult missions that the alliance has to offer. He is also the only playable character in the game. Red's main friends who fight on his side are Captain Potter, his instructor for his missions, the female "Agent Goggles", and the male "Agent Mortar". The main goal of Shadow Command is to defeat the Russian Empire, using whatever means possible to defeat the Russian war machine from within.

Along the way, Red meets up with Colonel Sergei, who he at first mistakes for an enemy officer, but later listens to the Colonel as he is told of his true heritage. Red has a hard time believing this story, but he soon starts having frequent flashbacks of his real family being murdered by General Popov's henchmen as a result of this. Red rescues Dr. Meier, who soon reveals the whole story of his true heritage and restores his memory back to normal. With his memory restored, Red soon meets up with his sister Anastasia. At first, Red/Alexander was to be the new Tsar of Russia, but now, his mind's made up, asking his sister to address the Russian people and reveal the truth about General Popov and his evil actions against their family and take the throne, becoming Tsarina of Russia. At first, Anastasia disagrees with him, but her brother says to her that his destiny now "lies with Shadow Command. I'm sworn to them, and must honor my promise". Following this chat, Red soon seeks out the last remains of an Allied spy airship mission that was forced down in the Alps to retrieve secret document from it.

When he gets there, Red finds Agent Mortar alive and well, now a traitor who's turned against Shadow Command. Mortar stole the documents earlier, even set Red up at an earlier point when Red saved Dr. Meier, who warned him of his friends. After a brief confrontation of his old friend, Mortar tries unsuccessfully to deliver the Allied documents to General Popov, but Red manages to stop him from getting away. Following this, Red finally reaches the Tsar's palace but not before disarming a doomsday device on a train on the way there. When he gets there, he finds the fake Tsar Oleg and manages (with some difficulty) to eliminate him. While dying, Oleg reveals to Red that General Popov is headed for London with another Doomsday Device in a double-structured Zeppelin.

Following this, in the last level of the game, Red then reaches the destination of Popov's Zeppelin on board the British aircraft carrier HMS York. First, Red has to man the AA guns on the carrier to defend the carrier against the fighter-bomber escorts of the Zeppelin. After this threat is dealt with, Popov's Zeppelin (escorted by two more zeppelins) enters the area. Red then takes off in his plane to shoot down the Zeppelin to avenge his murdered family. After a real difficult battle, the General's Zeppelin is shot down. Popov tries to escape in another Russian bomber, which Red shoots down, killing the evil man who had killed his family ten years earlier. The world is saved, and Russia is now under rule of Tsarina Anastasia. Most online sources cover up the true story and say that the main villain is Pietre instead of Popov, whose father died earlier.

== Reception ==
Reception

Aggregate score
Aggregator	Score
GameRankings	62%

Review scores
Publication	Score
CNET Gamecenter	4/10
Computer Gaming World	1.5/5
Computer and Video Games	3/5
Eurogamer	4/10
GamePro	4/5
GameSpot	5.7/10
GameSpy	78%
IGN	7.3/10
PC Gamer (US)	52%
PC Zone	44%

The game received mixed reviews according to the review aggregation website GameRankings.

According to former DICE employee Sean Decker, the game sold about 20,000 units.
