= Battlefield 2 =

2005 video game

- Developer: Digital Illusions CE
- Publisher: Electronic Arts
- Designers: Lars Gustavsson; Linus Josephson; Erik Sjövold
- Programmers: Andreas Fredriksson; Jonas Kjellström; Mats Dal
- Artists: Mårten Lundsten; Riccard Linde
- Composers: Fredrik Englund; David Tallroth; Jonas Ostholm
- Series: Battlefield
- Engine: Refractor 2
- Platform: Microsoft Windows
- Release: NA: June 21, 2005; AU: June 22, 2005; EU: June 24, 2005
- Genre: First-person shooter
- Modes: Single-player, multiplayer

Battlefield 2 is a 2005 first-person shooter game developed by Digital Illusions CE and published by Electronic Arts for Microsoft Windows. It is the third installment in the Battlefield series. It was released on June 21, 2005, in North America.

Battlefield 2 is a first-person shooter with strategy and tactical shooter elements. Players fight on a modern battlefield, using modern weapon systems. The single-player aspect features missions involving clashes between U.S. Marines, China and the fictional Middle Eastern Coalition. The multiplayer aspect of the game allows players to organize into squads that come under the leadership of a single commander to promote teamwork. The story takes place in the early 21st century during a fictional world war between various power blocs: China, the European Union, the fictional Middle Eastern Coalition (MEC), Russia and the United States. The game takes place on several different fronts, as the Middle East and China are invaded by US and EU forces, and the United States is being invaded by Chinese and MEC forces.

The game received critical acclaim and, like its predecessor, is considered one of the greatest games of all time. On June 30, 2014, the multiplayer master server was shut down alongside other GameSpy-powered titles, although it can still be played online through fan-created mods with alternative servers. In 2017, Electronic Arts demanded the takedown of modified versions of Battlefield 2 on alternative servers distributed by a group known as "Revive Network", alleging copyright infringement.

A sequel, Battlefield 3, was released on October 25, 2011.

== Gameplay ==
Battlefield 2 screenshot showing a USMC Spec Ops player capturing a MEC control point

Battlefield 2 is a sequel to Battlefield Vietnam and introduces several modifications to the gameplay mechanics of its predecessor. Several new gameplay features emphasize teamwork and collaboration. The new game engine includes improved physics, dynamic lighting, and more realistic material penetration.

Battlefield 2 is a multiplayer video game played via the Internet or on a local area network. A single-player mode with three difficulty levels is included. Both player modes use the same maps and use Battlefield's conquest game mode. Single-player mode allows 16 computer-controlled players while Internet mode allows up to 64 players. Players can choose to play as the United States Marine Corps, the People's Liberation Army, or the "Middle Eastern Coalition". Additional factions are playable through expansion packs, such as the European Union. Progress in the game is made via promotions which allow additional weapons to be unlocked. By playing the game on ranked servers, players are able to add to their global player statistics. These statistics are used to award promotions and other achievements.

In Battlefield 2, players are divided into two opposing teams, with the factions determined by the selected map. The primary objective is to reduce the opposing team's tickets, which represent the army's capacity to reinforce their position on the battlefield. Each team has a limited number of tickets, and each casualty decreases the available total. Control points, represented by flags, serve as spawn points and are strategically important on the map. If one team controls a significant majority of the control points, the opposing team's tickets gradually decrease regardless of casualties. A round ends when one team's tickets are depleted, when the round timer expires, or if a team holds no control points and has no remaining soldiers on the battlefield.

Battlefield 2's two game modes are Conquest and Cooperative. Cooperative games emphasize teamwork, prioritizing group achievement over individual victory. The only difference between the two modes is that Cooperative includes computer-controlled players, while Conquest allows only human players. Results from Cooperative mode do not count toward global player statistics.

=== Infantry classes ===
In Battlefield 2, as with previous Battlefield titles, players are able to select from a variety of infantry classes. Each class of soldier is equipped with different weaponry appropriate to their role in the battle. Assault soldiers, for example, are general-purpose infantry with grenade-launcher equipped assault-rifles and extra armor, Medics carry first-aid equipment such as a field defibrillator, and Anti-Tank troopers are equipped with missiles which are effective against heavy armor.

Players are able to choose a class at the start of a match, or between dying and respawn. Players can change their class by picking up a 'kit' from the body of an incapacitated soldier, regardless of whether the soldier is friendly or enemy. For example, an Assault soldier can become a Medic by acquiring a fallen Medic's kit. Player classes are categorized into 'Heavy' and 'Light' types: Heavy classes have reduced damage to the torso but lower stamina, while Light classes have standard damage multipliers and higher stamina, allowing for longer sprinting.

Within the infantry class, there are three support classes with special abilities. Within the infantry, three support classes have unique abilities: the Engineer can repair vehicles using his wrench; the Medic can revive and heal teammates using defibrillator paddles; and the Support can resupply ammunition using ammunition bags. When any of these classes occupies a vehicle, nearby personnel and vehicles can receive repairs, healing, or resupply, provided they are within close proximity.

- Assault - Primary role is to engage in combat with enemies at medium range.
- Medic - Primary role is to revive and heal teammates
- Anti-Tank - Primary role is to undertake anti-tank warfare
- Engineer - Primary role is to repair or destroy vehicles
- Support - Primary role is to provide suppressive fire against enemies and resupply teammates
- Special Forces - Primary role is carry out stealth and sabotage missions
- Sniper - Primary role is to engage targets at long distances.

=== Vehicles ===
Battlefield 2 continues the series’ signature vehicle-based gameplay, allowing players to enter and control a wide variety of vehicles. There are many different types of vehicles playable in Battlefield 2, all based on real-life vehicles used by the militaries of different countries.

In contrast to Battlefield 1942, Battlefield 2 has only one purely water-based vehicle, the rigid-inflatable boat; however, the three APCs can travel in water as well. The game was designed with a counterbalance system in which each vehicle type has specific vulnerabilities, creating a dynamic similar to rock-paper-scissors. For example, mobile anti-air was intended to effectively destroy helicopters, but are vulnerable against opposing tanks. Included within this relationship are stationary defenses such as light machine guns and anti-aircraft/TOW emplacements. The availability and number of certain vehicles are dependent on the map and its size as well as control points captured. Also, more vehicles become available to be used on the maps of expansion/booster packs. (see Maps). The USS Essex is the only naval ship featured in BF2, featuring two spawn points and aircraft spawn points, and is not drivable or destroyable, except for its Phalanx turrets.

=== Squads ===
Players are able to form squads of up to six soldiers in order to more effectively work as a team. Up to nine squads are permitted per team; each squad has a number (automatically assigned) and name (usually a phonetic alphabet letter) for identification. Members of a squad have the ability to communicate with one another via Battlefield 2's integrated voice over IP (VoIP) system.

Squad leaders may assign their squad a variety of objectives (for example, moving to or attacking a specific location). Orders may also be given by the team's commander. Squad leaders are able to issue requests for commander assets (such as artillery fire) and have a direct VoIP channel to the commander.

Members of a squad may spawn near their squad leader, provided that the leader is not dead (or incapacitated), and that the team holds at least one control point. This feature allows squads to more quickly regroup after taking casualties.

=== Commander ===
The commander position is an exclusive role played by one member of each team. Any member of a team may apply for the position, but priority is given to players of higher rank.

The commander alone has access to the "commander screen", an interface similar to that of a real-time strategy game. This allows the commander an overview of the battlefield as a whole, or zoom in and view parts of the map in real-time. The commander also has control of the various commander assets, which include artillery strikes, vehicle and supply drops, and UAVs. They can deploy them to assist their team. The commander can communicate with squads either by sending orders, or via VoIP voice communication. These tools allow the commander to strategically coordinate their forces on the battlefield.

A commander may resign at any point, freeing the position for other members of their team; they may also be forcibly removed by a successful mutiny vote conducted by their team (provided the server allows mutiny votes). Although the commander does not gain points by normal methods (kills, flag captures, etc.), their score is doubled at the end of the round if their team wins.

The commander position would be seen again in Battlefield 2142 and Battlefield 4.

=== Awards and unlockable weapons ===
Players can earn awards (ribbons, badges, and medals) for certain in-game accomplishments. Badges and ribbons are the easiest to obtain, while medals are usually much harder, requiring more extensive play. As players ascend through the ranks they will gain the ability to unlock certain weapons. Each time a player is promoted to an eligible rank, they are given the opportunity to unlock one of seven unlockable weapons, one corresponding to each class, which they may subsequently use in place of the standard weapon for the given class.

=== Battlefield recorder ===
A built-in game recorder records battles for subsequent replay. These files can be downloaded from a server which supports BattleRecorder directly after their respective game. Recorded battle files are around 1 to 8 megabytes in size and are played within the Battlefield 2 engine. Camera angles can be changed (free roaming & selected player), as well as the speed, though there is no rewind capability. Files can be exported to AVI format. The Battlefield Recorder has facilitated the creation of various machinima. Usage of the PunkBuster service is mandatory for all official ranked Battlefield 2 servers, but optional for unranked servers.

=== Maps ===
3 variations for the Gulf of Oman map

Battlefield 2 offers 15 maps for the players to play but shipped with 12. These maps are diverse, ranging from swamps such as Songhua Stalemate, to urban areas such as Strike at Karkand, to an unfinished dam known as Kubra Dam. The USMC is present in all maps and faces against either the MEC or the PLA depending on the map. The PLA is present in Far East theaters such as Dragon Valley and Daqing Oilfields. MEC is present in Middle East theaters such as Gulf of Oman and Zatar Wetlands. Including the expansion and booster packs, the total number of maps available in the Battlefield 2 series increases to 29.

Battlefield 2 maps have 3 variations, each suited for a certain number of players. Each map has 16, 32, and 64 player-suggested variations in which the area of battlefield or playing field is relatively small, medium, and large, respectively. The only exceptions to this are Wake Island 2007, which is locked at 64-player size and the Euro Force maps, Operation Smokescreen, Great Wall, and Taraba Quarry, which have no 64-player size. 32 and 64 player maps are unavailable to offline players from retailers, but an option is given to download 64 Single player AI bot mods. Other contrasts between these variations other than the size are the number and position of control points and availability of vehicles. As a result, the gameplay of the map is different depending on the variation.

== Plot ==
The game is set in 2007 during a world war between various power blocs: the United States, aided by the European Union, is at war against China and the fictional Middle Eastern Coalition (MEC), along with Russia and the UK fighting against both each other and against insurgents.

There is no given reason as to how or why the war broke out. In-game, the European Union and the United States fight China and the MEC. It is mentioned in-game that the US and EU are allies and the EU has negotiated a truce with Russia, but it is unknown if China and the MEC are allies. The game also takes place in different fronts, as the Middle East and China are being invaded by US and EU forces, and the United States is being invaded by Chinese and MEC forces.

== Additional content ==
=== Battlefield 2: Special Forces ===
Battlefield 2: Special Forces
- Developer: Digital Illusions Canada
- Publisher: Electronic Arts
- Engine: Refractor 2
- Platform: Microsoft Windows
- Release: NA: November 22, 2005; JP: November 24, 2005; PAL: November 25, 2005
- Genre: First-person shooter
- Modes: Single-player, Multiplayer

Battlefield 2's first expansion pack, Special Forces, first began its development sometime during or shortly before the release of the original Battlefield 2, and was worked on by DICE's Canadian division. Battlefield producer, Mike Doran, commented in August 2005 that "The truth is that work on Battlefield 2: Special Forces began several months ago." It was officially announced on July 14, 2005 and released on November 21 of the same year. The focus of the development was infantry-based combat as opposed to vehicle-centric combat from the original. As such, most of the additional content in the expansion pack can only be used by or for infantry.

The expansion pack provides eight maps, 6 playable factions, and ten more vehicles such as the AH-64D Apache and Mi-35 Hind, though all jets have been removed. In addition to these new contents, players have access to new equipment such as night vision goggles, tear gas, gas masks, zip lines and grappling hooks which can alter gameplay. There are eight more small arms weapons available such as the G36K/E and FN SCAR L/H and several weapons from the original are replaced. The expansion offers more awards in the form of badges, ribbons, and medals that players can earn. Finally, many of the weapons from the expansion may be used in the original Battlefield 2.

=== Booster packs ===
Battlefield 2: Booster Pack Collection
- Developer: Digital Illusions Canada
- Publisher: Electronic Arts
- Engine: Refractor 2
- Platform: Microsoft Windows
- Release: November 20, 2006
- Genre: First-person shooter
- Modes: Single-player, Multiplayer

Booster packs are additional content released for Battlefield 2 that are currently available for free download, and as with Special Forces, they were developed by DICE Canada. The booster packs were later available in retail form as the Booster Pack Collection, containing a DVD which features these packs, as well as being included in "The Complete Collection", containing a DVD with both the original game and all of the expansions/booster packs.

Booster packs substantially expand the content to the game, but are different from expansion packs because they are intended to add to the original gameplay and not stand on their own (such as Special Forces does). The booster packs include new maps, vehicles, and a new European Union faction.

The two booster packs were included free of charge in the 1.50 update released on September 1, 2009.

==== Euro Force ====
Battlefield 2: Euro Force is the first booster pack, and was released on March 14, 2006. The booster pack allows players to play as a new European Union army, armed with new weapons and vehicles from the various countries of the EU. It is available for purchase online at the Electronic Arts download service, or as part of the retail Booster Pack Collection. It was scheduled for release in February, but was delayed due to a substantial number of new bugs caused by the release of patch 1.2. It features a whole new army, 4 new vehicles, 3 new maps, and 7 new weapons such as the L85A2 with AG36 GL, the FAMAS, the HK53, the HK21, and the Benelli M4. Some of the vehicles for the EU military include the Challenger 2, Eurocopter Tiger, Leopard 2A6 and the Eurofighter. The maps include 'Great Wall', against the People's Liberation Army of China, where the EU army is trying to gain a strong foothold in northern China, to reinforce their American allies in the south later on. 'Operation Smoke Screen' features the EU army fighting the MEC in the Middle East for precious oil fields, and the third map, 'Taraba Quarry', where the EU army is trying to reinforce American positions in the south. Mindful of the European plans, the MEC tries to stall the EU, where the Europeans must confront their enemies because that route is the only possible path along that side of the Caspian Sea.

It was made free with patch 1.5.

==== Armored Fury ====
Battlefield 2: Armored Fury is the second booster pack released for Battlefield 2 and was released on June 6, 2006. It added three new maps, as well as two new vehicle classes: attack jets for close air support and reconnaissance helicopters that operate as a mobile UAV. The booster pack has the USMC defending U.S. soil from invasions from the PLA and MEC. Operation Midnight Sun features the Chinese landing at the Alaskan port Valdez where they are trying to secure much needed fuel from the pipeline. Operation Road Rage is a MEC vs. USMC map, where the MEC are using US Highways to transport units to industrial areas. Operation Harvest sees the United States trying to stall the MEC en route to the capital of Washington D.C. from the northwest, being blocked in a Pennsylvania Dutch farm, while waiting for reinforcements. New vehicles include Attack or Close Air Support aircraft such as the A-10 Thunderbolt II, Su-39 and the Nanchang Q-5 as well as new light utility helicopters such as MH-6 Little Bird, EC-635 and the Z-11. As well as the addition of new helicopters and planes, DICE also added the Muscle Car and Semi Truck. However, the proposed AV-8B Harrier was cut from the add-on due to balancing issues.

Like Euro Force, it was made free with patch 1.5.

== Soundtrack ==
Battlefield 2 - Armored Fury theme
41 second sample from the Main theme of Armored Fury.

The soundtrack of Battlefield 2 consists of 18 tracks composed and created by Fredrik Englund, David Tallroth, and Jonas Östholm.

== Reception ==
Reception

Aggregate score
Aggregator	Score
Metacritic	91/100

Review scores
Publication	Score
G4	5/5
GameSpot	9.3/10
GameSpy	5/5
IGN	8.9/10

Awards
Publication	Award
GameSpot	Best Multiplayer game of 2005
Maximum PC's	2006 Multiplayer game of the Year Award
Game Critics Awards	Best Online Multiplayer 2005

The game received widespread critical acclaim, garnering an aggregate score of 91/100 from 55 reviews on Metacritic. It received five stars out of five from publications Yahoo! Games, GameSpy, X-Play and Computer Gaming World. PC Gamer awarded it 94%, stating, "Its finely tuned maps and balanced gameplay prove that you can improve on perfection," and honored it as Game of the Year. GameSpot rated the game 9.3 out of 10 claiming that "when you experience Battlefield 2 like it's meant to be played, with everyone working together and using real-time voice chat, the game quickly becomes unlike anything else that you've played before."

Some of the lower scores were reactions to the large amount of bugs and glitches in the initial release, including crash to desktop bugs and network problems. For example, Gaming Nexus (who awarded the game an 8.7 out of 10) reported, "I’ve had many cool experiences playing it and a lot of 'did I just see that' moments but all of that is crapped on by the bugs and quirks in the game."

GamesRadar approved of the game, awarding a 90%, but added a disclaimer that the gaming experience is best "if your machine is up to it". GameSpot's review agreed with the high system requirements noting that "the load times are one of the biggest gripes that we have, as you will spend quite a bit of time waiting for a game to start up, even on high-end machines...also a bit demanding in the hardware department."

Battlefield 2 sold 1.2 million copies in its first month after release. Total sales by July 2006 were 2,225,000. It received a "Gold" sales award from the Entertainment and Leisure Software Publishers Association (ELSPA), indicating sales of at least 200,000 copies in the United Kingdom.

Battlefield 2 won PC Gamer US's "Best Multiplayer Game 2005" and "Game of the Year 2005" awards. The magazine's Dan Stapleton wrote, "Few other games in the history of the medium have so effectively captured the visceral feeling of modern military combat in an urban environment". The editors of Computer Games Magazine presented Battlefield 2 with their 2005 awards for "Best Action Game" and "Best Multiplayer", and named it the year's second-best computer game overall. They called it "perhaps the most thrilling example of how far shooters have come in the last few years."

During the 9th Annual Interactive Achievement Awards, the Academy of Interactive Arts & Sciences awarded Battlefield 2 with "First-Person Action Game of the Year" and "Outstanding Achievement in Online Gameplay", along with a nomination for "Computer Game of the Year".
