= Jeffrey J. Rothschild =

American billionaire (born 1954)

- Born: Jeffrey Jackiel Rothschild; February 28, 1954 (age 72)
- Education: Vanderbilt University (BS, MS)
- Occupation: Businessman
- Known for: Founding engineer, Facebook
- Spouse: Marieke Rothschild
- Children: 3

Jeffrey Jackiel Rothschild (born February 28, 1954) is an American billionaire businessman who co-founded several companies. He is the founding engineer and a large shareholder of Facebook.

== Early life ==
Rothschild is the son of Beverley and William B. Rothschild. His father was president of M. Rothschild & Company, an importer of commodities from South East Asia founded by his grandfather, Marcus Rothschild. He received bachelor's and master's degrees from Vanderbilt University in 1977 and 1979, respectively. He is of Jewish descent. He is not a member of the Rothschild banking family.

== Career ==
Rothschild worked as an engineer at Honeywell and Intel, and then for a consulting firm that worked on projects such as Locus Computing Corporation. Rothschild co-founded Veritas Software in 1988. He co-founded Mpath Interactive in 1995, which became a public company in 1999.

Rothschild is listed as co-inventor on several MPath patents. In 1999 he became an advisor and venture partner at the venture capital firm Accel Partners.

In 2003, Rothschild co-founded Mendocino Software, with fellow former-Veritas executives Peter Levine and Steve Colman. Mendocino shut down quietly by March 2008.

Rothschild started working for Facebook in 2005. He was the oldest person working for Facebook at the time. He became Facebook's vice president of infrastructure software. In 2012, he owned 18 million Facebook shares.

== Other activities ==
Rothschild serves as the vice chair of the board of trustees of his alma mater, Vanderbilt University. With his wife, he endowed two scholarships in the School of Engineering and the College of Arts and Science in 2013, and he donated $20 million for the construction of two new buildings on campus, Vanderbilt Hall and Barnard Hall, in December 2016.

== Personal life ==
Rothschild and his wife Marieke have three children, and live in Palo Alto, California. According to Forbes, Rothschild is worth about $2.9 billion as of May 2022.
