= GameSpy Arcade =

Multiplayer game server browsing utility

- Original author: GameSpy Industries
- Developer: IGN Entertainment
- Initial release: November 13, 2000
- Operating system: Microsoft Windows
- Available in: English
- Type: Game server browser
- License: Proprietary
- Website: gamespyarcade.com

GameSpy Arcade was a shareware multiplayer game server browsing utility. GameSpy Arcade allowed players to view and connect to available multiplayer games, and chat with other users of the service. It was initially released by GameSpy Industries, on November 13, 2000, to replace the aging GameSpy3D and Mplayer.com program. Version 2.0.5 was the latest offering of the software, boasting additional features such as increased speed and advanced server sorting abilities.

== History ==
Discussing GameSpy Arcade's history, Ian Birnbaum of PC Gamer US wrote, "GameSpy began in 1996 as a fan-hosted server for the original Quake. By the early 2000s, GameSpy was the online multiplayer platform, adding dozens of games every year." The service closed in May 2014.

== Features ==
GameSpy Arcade included various other features which enhance its overall functionality:

- Ability for users to have their own profiles.
- Scanning a user's hard disk for Arcade compatible games.
- A basic web browser.
- Voice Chat
- Buddy Instant Messaging
- Game Staging rooms
- Dedicated Server browsing
- User Rooms

== Subscription ==
GameSpy Arcade was free. However the software maintained shareware status as there were three different subscription levels. These levels provided benefits, each according to their price.

=== Basic users ===
"Basic users" could be created for free at the GameSpy website. They were able to display and connect to games, as well as chat to users inside the game lobby. Advertisements were shown inside the program for these users.

=== GameSpy Arcade ===
"GameSpy Arcade", the first pay subscription service ($4.95/Month, $24.95/Year), provided extended functionality such as no advertisements and in-game voice chat, as well as priority service for technicians to assist in solving problems with the software.

=== Founders Club ===
"Founders Club", the second pay subscription service ($9.95/Month, $79.95/Year), was the highest possible level of membership to GameSpy arcade. This subscription had benefits which applied across the entire GameSpy network, including FilePlanet access, and ‘Insider’ newsletters. This was the most expensive of the subscriptions on offer. There were some issues with the "Founders Club" subscription that caused this subscription to show up as a normal subscription on GameSpy Arcade.

== Games ==
GameSpy Arcade allowed users to play games online such as Halo: Combat Evolved, Battlefield 2, Half-Life: Counter-Strike, Unreal Tournament, Star Wars: Battlefront II, Quake III Arena, Rogue Spear, as well as various other first-person shooters and strategy games. Additionally, there were parlor games, but these were removed due to security flaws found in the actual parlor games. Some of the parlor games that existed were Y.A.R.N (story making) Reversi, Checkers, Chess, and Backgammon.

== See also ==
- The All-Seeing Eye
