= Ravaged =

2012 video game

- Developer: 2 Dawn Games
- Publisher: Reverb Publishing
- Engine: Unreal Engine 3
- Release: October 17, 2012
- Genre: First-person shooter
- Mode: Multiplayer

Ravaged is a multiplayer first-person shooter video game featuring vehicular combat. Developed by American studio 2 Dawn Games, the game was partly funded through Kickstarter, raising $38,767 on the platform in May 2012.

== Gameplay ==
Players team up and choose between two game modes, base control and capture the flag. Players are then launched into an open sandbox map, that is populated with outposts and spawn points. Players are provided with guns and vehicles to complete objectives related to the chosen game mode.

== Downloadable content ==
In August 2013, the game received the free Zombie Apocalypse DLC, introducing a co-operative multiplayer mode where players must escape zombie hordes.

== Reception ==
Reception

Aggregate score
Aggregator	Score
Metacritic	64/100

Review scores
Publication	Score
Destructoid	6/10
GameRevolution	4/5
GameSpot	6/10
GameSpy	3/5
IGN	6.7/10

The game received mixed reviews upon release, garnering a score of 64 out of 100 on the review aggregation website Metacritic.
