= Mplayer.com =

Computer gaming online service

MPlayer.com
- Founded: 1996; 30 years ago
- Defunct: 2001
- Fate: Acquired
- Successor: GameSpy
- Headquarters: Mountain View, California, USA
- Website: www.mplayer.com

Mplayer, referred to as Mplayer.com by 1998, was a free (after being a paid subscription service) online PC gaming service and community that operated from late 1996 until early 2001. The service at its peak was host to a community of more than 20 million visitors each month and offered more than 100 games. Some of the more popular titles available were action games like Quake, Command & Conquer, Duke Nukem 3D, and Rogue Spear, as well as classic card and board for more casual gamers. Servers and matchmaking was provided through a proprietary client. Initially, the service was subscription-based, but by early 1997, they became the first major multiplayer community to offer games to be played online through their network for free. This was done by relying on advertisement-based revenues.

Mplayer was a unit of Mpath Interactive, a Silicon Valley–based startup. The demand for online gaming in the late 1990s resulted in huge growth for the service. They became known for supplying a range of features integrated through their software, including their very successful voice chat feature. This feature proved so popular that it was later split off as a VoIP service to cater to non-gamers, dubbed HearMe, which would eventually become the new name of the company. The company was listed on NASDAQ as MPTH and later HEAR.

Despite the growth of their gaming unit, Mplayer was never profitable. HearMe continued to refocus themselves on VoIP technologies and, in 2000, had sold off Mplayer to competitor GameSpy. In addition, some technologies were sold to 4anything.com. HearMe survived the buyout and continued to operate independently. Mplayer was taken offline and integrated into GameSpy Arcade in 2001. HearMe shut-down in mid 2000.

== History ==
The company first began as Mpath Interactive, a venture capital start-up co-founded in early 1995 by Brian Apgar, Jeff Rothschild, Brian Moriarty, and Danielle Berry, based in Cupertino, California. It was later renamed to HearMe. Mpath Interactive later moved to Mountain View, California, after acquiring Catapult Entertainment, Inc., and their online gaming service XBAND. Mplayer began as a division in October 1996 to provide online gaming to subscribed users. A few months prior to launching Mplayer, Mpath announced their goal for the service in a job description:

Not only will people go to the Internet for information, they will also go to it to meet and interact with other people. Mplayer, scheduled to debut 1996, will bring the excitement of real-time multi-player gaming to the Internet's World Wide Web for the first time. It will feature popular PC-based games from well-known game publishers. Mplayer's features will include voice-capable games and chat rooms where players can converse as they play the games, watch games in progress and choose teams or opponents.

In February 1997, they began to offer internet play for free for their major commercial games such as Quake, as well as card and board games such as Scrabble and Spades. They were one of the first major commercial communities on the internet to offer such a service. They continued to add many new games to their offering. The slogan that was used from its founding was "Wanna Play?" By the end of 1998, the company had a staff of 111 employees, and about 80 by late 2000. The company was listed on NASDAQ beginning April 29, 1999 as MPTH, which changed to HEAR by late September of the same year.

=== Revenues ===
Of course, we hope that players will eventually play for free - because they're looking at all this advertising. But until we get 100,000 players (or whatever the magic number is that attracts advertisers) then players will have to pay.

— Brian Moriarty, 1996

Games first offered over Mplayer were by subscription. In addition to the Gaming Service, Mpath also launched a "preferred" ISP service, WebBullet, reselling InterRamp ISP accounts on the PSINet network, the very backbone which Mplayer.com's production services were hosted on. In early 1997, their growth allowed the service to be offered for free through support of its advertising network, which eventually became known as the Mplayer Entertainment Network. However, the subscription model was retained, known as Plus, and gave special privileges to these member who subscribed. The yearly rate was US$39.95, or $29.95 for two years; this gave access to certain games, their rating and ranking system in Quake and Quake II, as well as online tournaments. Subscriptions had previously been $20 per month, but upon changing their business model to offer many services for free, MPlayer decided to switch to a yearly rate so that they would not have to market to their subscribers every month in order to keep them.

While certain releases were kept as "Plus Only" features for a brief time, in many cases the Plus game rooms were simply games hosted by Mplayer's own servers. With the rapid growth of Quake fans, and the increased server load, Mplayer opened the door to the QuakeWorld network, exponentially increasing the number of available game servers, and offering someone a chance to get a faster connection to a game. The downside was that there was very little control of cheat codes in these systems. Mplayer tried to increase the appeal of the Plus subscription, offering a "secure" Mplayer owned Server hosted Game, and offering Rankings and customizable Clan Skins.

With the Internet user demographic changing, a growing market emerged for classic games, with Scrabble and Battleship leading the charge. Mplayer turned more into an aggregator, hoping to attract as many users as possible with free, ad-supported games and software, including Checkers, Othello, and Chess.

Despite this, the company had been losing money, $11.9 million in 1998 alone, and by late 1999, had yet to break even. MPath was forced to look toward different venues. Proprietary technologies that were developed as features for Mplayer, known internally as POP.X, were later licensed to third parties. This was meant to help other companies create their own internet communities using existing technology. Third parties that licensed this technology included companies like Electronic Arts and Fujitsu. HearMe, the internal audio chat feature in Mplayer that was later split off, eventually accounted for 50% of all of the company's revenues.

=== Growth ===
Mplayer began as online gaming was still in its infancy. That along with their initial subscription fee that was required to use its service limited its early growth. Mplayer gained popularity after making its service available for free to all users in early 1997, and by early 1998 had attracted more than 125,000 monthly visitors and 400,000 total members. The entire network had averaged 800,000 hours of gameplay each month, with each member averaging 15 sessions a month for 35 minutes each time. By the end of that year, Mplayer had 2 million total registered users. By March 1999, Mplayer had over 3 million total users, and over 80,000 unique daily visitors, averaging over 300 minutes of gameplay each. Mplayer saw some of its biggest growth during this period, with more than 200 million total minutes of gameplay per month beginning in 1999. According to internal data from HearMe at the time, Mplayer.com was the tenth most popular site on the internet in terms of total monthly usage time.

The huge growth of Mplayer was closely associated with the growth in the internet in the late 1990s that culminated in the dot com boom. This was seen in their first day of being publicly traded when their IPO nearly doubled. By the time of the buyout by GameSpy not long after, the service had over 10 million registered members, and 20 million unique visitors per month.

=== HearMe ===
HearMe.com was launched in January 1999 following the success of Mplayer. Mpath intended to expand their market from entertainment using money that was being made through Mplayer to create a VOIP communications network. The technology used was based on the lucrative audio chat software used within Mplayer. HearMe.com's website featured gratis voice and video-conferencing chatrooms, as well as free HTML (ActiveX) code that would allow one to add a voice-chat module directly to their own website and speak with visitors in realtime. The new business became successful to the point where the entire company decided to refocus itself on this market, and this unit was not part of the buyout. In late September 1999, Mpath Interactive bought Resounding Technology, Inc, maker of Roger Wilco, another audio chat program. HearMe continued to release updates of the software until mid 2000 when HearMe saw its end and went out of business. However, in late 2000 a deal with PalTalk emerged, where PalTalk assumed all rights to HearMe's technology. It was later implemented into GameSpy Arcade.

== Games ==
Mplayer offered a variety of game types to play online, including fast-paced action games, sports games, card and board games, amongst other types of games. Until late 1997, Mplayer had a lineup of about 20 games, with some of their more popular ones being Quake, Red Alert, Diablo, and Scrabble. In October 1997, it was announced that they would add more than 30 new games to their roster, making it the largest offering of any online gaming service at the time. The company wanted to diversify their market, and brought in many new types of games, such as Cavedog's Total Annihilation and a host of new card games to attract more casual gamers. In a deal with Sports Illustrated, Mpath introduced an entirely new section of games dedicated to sports. The new section was meant to accommodate sports gamers, as well as online tournaments and sport news and statistics.

The main commercial games were divided by channels into action, strategy, sims, and role-playing. Their popularity generally came down to the individual game rather than the type of game. Indeed, some games would often be too underpopulated to support matchmaking, while other more popular games would have a thriving community of hundreds or thousands of gamers. Competition of online matchmaking services for computer games had been increasing by the late 1990s. Mpath attempted to ensure that it stay up to date with the latest and most popular games being released. Some games like Quake II, Daikatana and Unreal were all heavily promoted as being available for online play even before their launch. In September 1998, Ultimate PC noted Quake, Quake II, and Team Fortress as the most popular games on the service.

A popular feature was the ability to download shareware versions of some games and play them online. For some games, this was supported by publishers as a means to promote their games at retail. In other cases, Mplayer arranged deals with developers to attract gamers with demos of popular games such as Quake and Unreal. The card and board games offered were supplied straight from Mplayer for free through their own software.

== Game community and market ==
=== Competition ===
When Mplayer launched, there were few major online gaming services, but in the late 1990s, it had numerous competitors. Notable competitors were Heat.net (built on a licensed version of Mplayer's core technology), Total Entertainment Network, Microsoft's Internet Gaming Zone (later MSN Gaming Zone), GameSpy3D, Kali, Blizzard's Battle.net, and Sierra's Won.net. Furthermore, Mplayer's offering of card and board games had been countered by numerous sites across the internet, including by services like from Yahoo! and GameStorm.

=== Marketing ===
Mplayer's first business model in online gaming was to charge gamers to play. Success was limited, however, and the company shortly after changed their marketing direction toward offering online play for free with supported advertising. The CEO of Mpath Interactive at the time, Paul Matteucci, put it: "It wasn't until we really got it – that it was about building a community around the games – that Mplayer.com took off," speaking on making the games free. It was from here that their model would begin to be based more around the actual community of gamers, and Mplayer would see its number of players climb several-fold.

Soon after, Mplayer had become a well-known player in the online gaming industry. As such, most of their marketing was geared toward attracting new gamers through a broader offering of games, as well as taking advantage of the large community they already had. The former can be seen in the hype surrounding the release of high-profile games of the time such as Unreal and Quake II, both of which were to be offered online through Mplayer.com. The company built a family-friendly image in order to appeal to both kids and adults, with chat rooms which were monitored to limit profanity. They also used their Plus service to cater to the more hardcore gamers who did not mind the extra fee. One source describes their presence at E3 2000:

E-3 2000, the Electronic Entertainment Expo, held at the Los Angeles Convention Center in May 2000, was a multimedia extravaganza. Nowhere was this more apparent than at the room-sized exhibit housing Mplayer.com, the premier on-line multiplayer gaming service. And, if the multimedia electronic action didn't grab your attention, the exhibit itself was sure to. Here was a mega multimedia presentation all its own. The exhibit, costing tens of thousands of dollars to design, fabricate, and install, occupied 1,000 square feet (93 m^{2}) on three raised floors, where fanatic gamers battled it out on a dozen big-screen overhead monitors...The design and construction represented an engineering marvel. Nothing had been left to chance in the exhibit's design.

Mplayer's exhibit at E3 established it as a major player in the gaming industry. Even at this late date, months before the buyout by GameSpy, Mpath was still aggressively marketing Mplayer. This was despite criticisms that splitting off HearMe took the company's focus away from gaming.

== Software ==
Mplayer gizmo in a game lobby. Toward the top are user portraits, while the top left is the audio chat.

Service was provided through proprietary software, a channel-based lobby and matchmaking client known as gizmo. The design and interface of gizmo was outsourced to two design companies, Good Dog Design and Naima Productions. Upon launching the program, users would choose from a list of games, that would then take them to a universal lobby for that game. From there, users could create their own game channel that would be displayed to everyone. They could also join a created game. The lobby would show a list of rooms, ordered from least to most latency. Green rooms indicate games that were fast enough to be playable, while red rooms were unplayable. The rocket icon indicated the game had been launched. This would bring them to a second private chatroom before entering the game. The channel creator acted as the moderator, who could launch the game and ban players in the lobby as well as change game settings, but could also make someone else a moderator. In some games like Quake, players could join the game after it was launched, but for most this was not possible.

=== Features ===
Mpath integrated many features into Mplayer in an attempt to stay competitive and support its community. Most of these features came with an update to Gizmo in December 1997, among them were voice chat, a chalkboard system in game channels that anyone could view known as ScribbleTalk, a built-in browser known as WebViewer, personal messaging, as well a ratings and rankings system for Plus members. The voice chat only allowed one person to speak at a time, but became extremely successful to the point where half of all Mplayer's service usage was from voice chat. Mpath soon after split off a division to focus on VoIP technologies in early 1999 catering to non-gamers. Ranked games were played in a separate lobby than normal games. Ranking was determined how well you played relative to your opponent's rank. In some games, this rank was only provisional until you played a certain number of games. Later on, the rank icon only appeared after enough games were played. Users could also customize their profiles by choosing a portrait from a set of pictures and edit their profile with HTML, however this feature was removed in later versions of gizmo.

== GameSpy buyout ==
Despite its success in attracting users, Mplayer was still in financial trouble in late 2000, and it had been speculated the division would be sold off, possibly to Sega, owner of Heat.net. However it was announced in December 2000 that GameSpy, an Irvine-based gaming site founded in 1996, made a deal to acquire Mplayer from HearMe. The two companies had fully merged by June 2001. Included in the deal was the Mplayer POP.X business unit and gaming service, as well as its Globalrankings system, which ranked players in game, and the Mplayer Entertainment Network, their advertising network. This was all sold off by HearMe for $20 million and a 10% stake in GameSpy. HearMe was willing to sell off its entertainment division to focus on its more profitable VoIP unit, while GameSpy wanted Mplayer's userbase for its own multiplayer gaming community. There was also the belief at GameSpy that HearMe had been neglecting the service in favor of its other ventures. At the time, GameSpy was looking to start over from its GameSpy3D service with GameSpy Arcade, which was then in beta. Only a few months after the acquisition, many features from Mplayer had been added to their new service.
