= Ventrilo =

Proprietary VoIP software

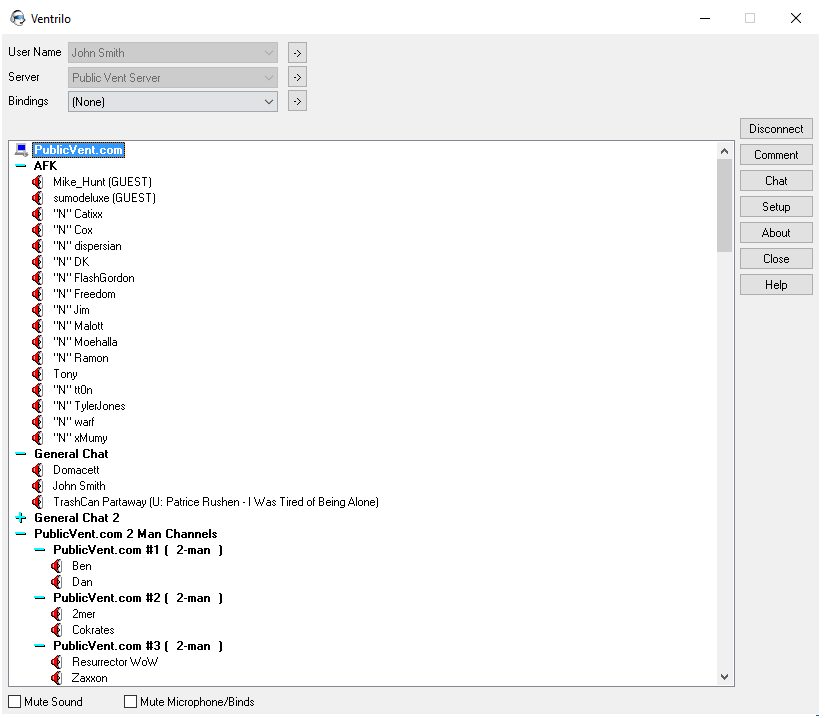
- Screenshot of the Ventrilo 3.0.8 client on Windows 10
- Developers: Flagship Industries, Inc. (2002-2023); LightSpeed Gaming LLC (2023-present)
- Initial release: 3 August 2002; 23 years ago
- Stable release: 4.1.5 / 20 June 2023; 2 years ago
- Operating system: Windows, macOS
- Type: VoIP, instant messaging
- License: Freeware
- Website: ventrilo.com

Ventrilo (Vent for short) is proprietary VoIP software that includes text chat. Originally developed by Flagship Industries, Inc., Ventrilo has been owned and operated by LightSpeed Gaming LLC since 2023.

The Ventrilo client and server are both available as freeware for use with up to 8 people on the same server. Rented servers can maintain up to 400 people. The Ventrilo server is available under a limited license for Microsoft Windows and macOS and is accessible on FreeBSD Kopi, Solaris and NetBSD. The client is available for Windows and macOS. However, the macOS client is still unable to properly use most servers because of a lack of support for the sparsely used GSM codec. No official Linux Ventrilo client has been released. Third-party Ventrilo clients are available for mobile devices, such as Ventrilode for iPhone and Ventriloid for Android.

Ventrilo supports the GSM Full Rate codec and used to support the Speex codec, which Ventrilo 4.0.0 replaced with the Opus codec.

== Usage ==
Ventrilo was heavily used by gamers in the 2000s, who used the software to communicate with other players on the same team of a multiplayer game, or for general chat. This usage inspired the 2006 smash single "Vi sitter i Ventrilo och spelar DotA" by Swedish artist Basshunter.

== History ==
=== Flagship Industries (2002-2023) ===
Ventrilo was developed by Flagship Industries, Inc., a company based in Illinois. The software was first released on 3 August 2002 and by players of massively multiplayer online role-playing games and first-person shooters.

After the release of version 3.0.8 in 2013, Flagship Industries released no major updates for nearly a decade. Version 4.0 launched on 23 August 2017, the first significant update in approximately ten years.

Flagship Industries, Inc. was dissolved on 8 September 2023, according to the Illinois Secretary of State.

=== LightSpeed Gaming (2023-present) ===
In 2023, LightSpeed Gaming LLC, an Ohio-based company that had operated as an authorized Ventrilo hosting provider since 2004, acquired the Ventrilo trademark and assets. The ventrilo.com website reflects this transfer, attributing the Ventrilo trademark to LightSpeed Gaming LLC. LightSpeed Gaming had previously operated InstantVentrilo.com, a Ventrilo server hosting service, as well as hosting services for Mumble and TeamSpeak.

In 2026, LightSpeed Gaming launched GameVox, a voice chat platform described by the company as a successor product, in open beta. PC Gamer reviewed GameVox in February 2026 as one of three free alternatives to Discord, noting its feature set and use of the Opus HD voice codec while observing that video call performance remained inconsistent during the beta period.

== Controversy ==
Flagship Industries, Inc., the original developer of Ventrilo, was involved in several copyright infringement cases as plaintiff.

== See also ==
- Comparison of VoIP software
- Discord
- GameVox
- Mumble
- Roger Wilco
- Skype
- TeamSpeak
