= GameSpy Technology =

GameSpy Industries, Inc.
- Company type: Subsidiary of Glu Mobile Inc.
- Industry: Video games Game Middleware; Game development tool
- Founded: April 30, 1997; 29 years ago Irvine, California, U.S.
- Defunct: May 31, 2014
- Headquarters: Costa Mesa, California and San Francisco, California
- Key people: Todd Northcutt (Division Vice President)
- Parent: Glu Mobile Inc. (2012–present) IGN Entertainment, Inc. (2000–2012) Independent (1997–2000)
- Website: www.GameSpyTechnology.com at the Wayback Machine (archived July 22, 2014)

GameSpy Technology (also known as GameSpy Industries, Inc.), a division of Glu Mobile, was the developer of the GameSpy Technology product, a suite of middleware tools, software, and services for use in the video game industry.

Gamespy Technology was acquired by Glu Mobile in 2012. The company and service were shut down in May 2014 when GameSpy was shut down.

== Technology ==
GameSpy Technology consisted of an array of portable C SDKs that plug into hosted web services that provided the following functionality:

- Game advertising and player matchmaking
- Player and team scores and statistics gathering, arbitration, ranking, rules processing, and leaderboards
- Arbitrary game data storage and retrieval for files to atomic data
- Team, guild, and clan services and management
- NAT Negotiation
- In-game purchases and downloadable content
- Presence, authentication, game invites, and instant messaging
- Player chat rooms
- CD key authentication
- Voice communication
- HTTP, XML, and socket data transport

== Supported platforms ==
- Microsoft Windows
- Mac OS
- PlayStation 2
- PlayStation 3
- PlayStation Portable
- Nintendo Wii
- Nintendo DS
- Nintendo DSi
- Linux
- iPhone

== Integrated technology partners ==
Game engines

- Unreal Engine 3
