= Eye of Providence (icon) =

Orthodox Christian icon

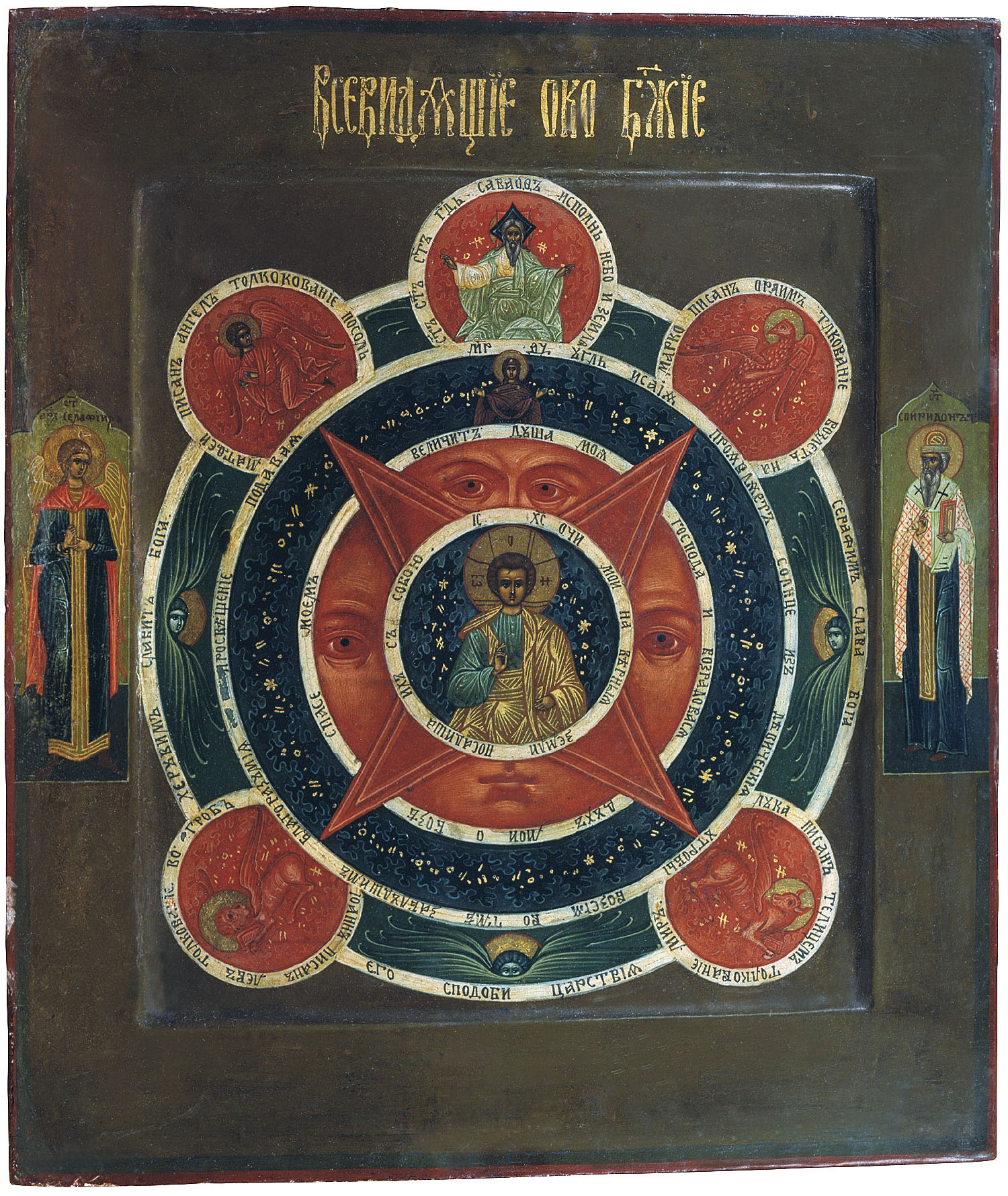
Eye of Providence icon, 19th century

The Eye of Providence or the All-Seeing Eye of God (Russian: «Всевидящее око Божие») is a type of Orthodox icon that emerged in Russian iconography in the 19th century. The image of the Eye of Providence, inscribed in a triangle, appeared in the paintings of Russian Orthodox churches from the end of 18th century to the first half of 19th century, later in the Russian iconography, mostly notably among the Old Believers. It is a symbolic and allegorical composition of the words from the Holy Scripture that represents the omniscient and vigilant all-seeing eye of Christ.

== Description ==
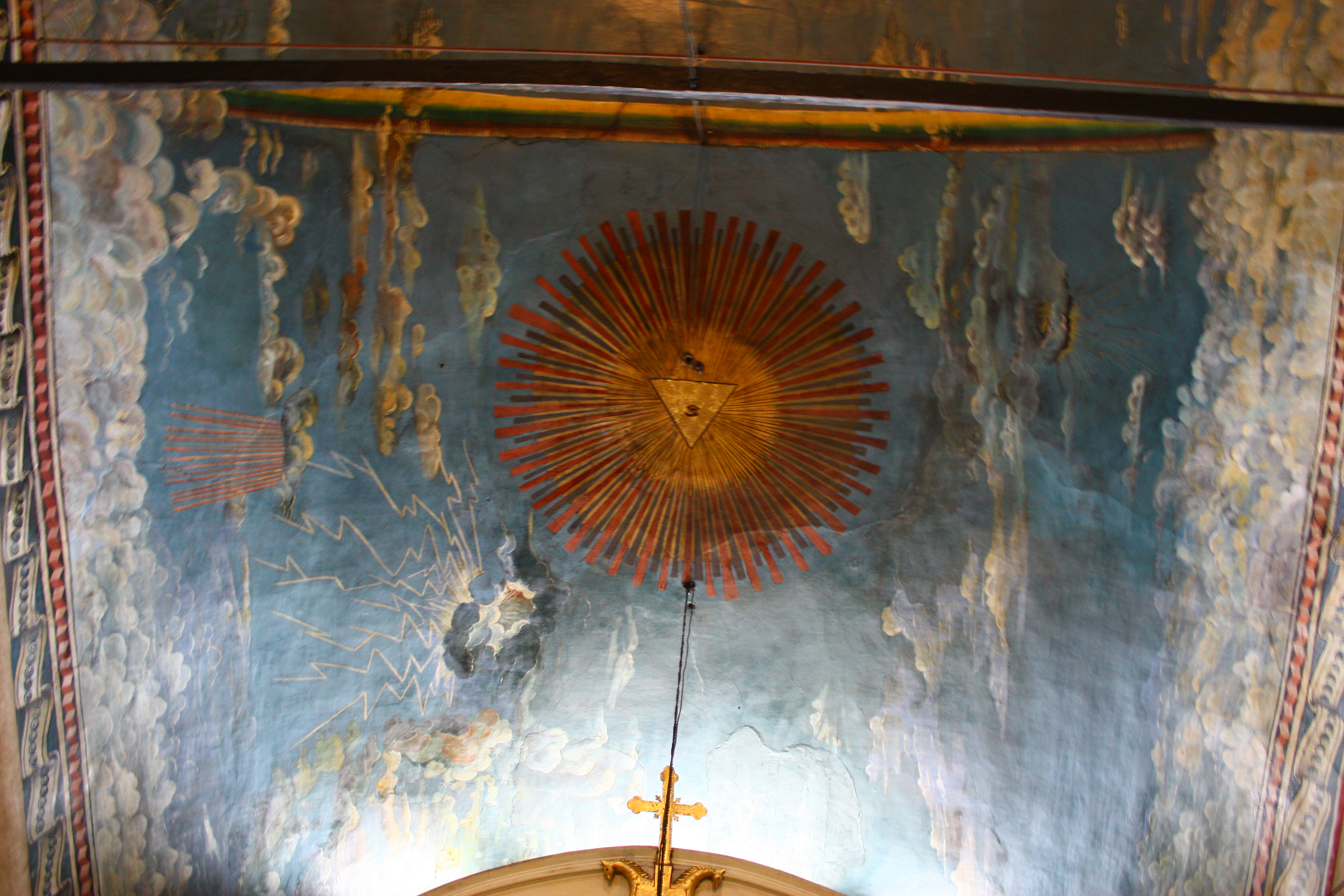
Ceiling fresco of the Eye of God, St. Demetrius’ Church in Bitola, North Macedonia

This icon is a symbolic and allegorical composition of the words from the Bible: “Behold, the eyes of the Lord are on those who fear Him, on those who hope in His mercy.” (Psalms 33:18)

At the heart of the composition of such icons is the recurring motif of circles. In the central circle, Jesus Christ is depicted in the iconographic image of the Saviour Emmanuel with a blessing gesture. From this circle on the diagonal proceed 4 rays, on their tops are 4 small circles, inside of which are the allegorical symbols of the evangelists (see tetramorph), or less often, the images of the four evangelists themselves.

Fragments of the human face – eyes, nose and mouth are placed in the segments of the next circle. Above this circle on the central axis depicted the Virgin Mary with arms raised.

The next circle is green or red, it can represent the sky, sometimes starry. In the outermost circle usually depicted seraphim, or angels with scrolls. Above it on the central axis is a truncated circle, in which the heaven is depicted, God the Father with a gesture of blessing is seen in this circle. From God the Father emanates the Holy Spirit, descending in the form of a dove on the head of the Theotokos.

The inscriptions found in the icon:

- Around the red face: “The Burning Coal appeared to Isaiah, the sun arose from the virgin’s womb, bringing to those who wandered in darkness the light of the knowledge of God.”
- Around the green circle is the Ode of the Theotokos: “My soul magnifies the Lord, and my spirit has rejoiced in God my Savior. For He has regarded the lowly state of His maidservant.” (Luke 1:46–48)
- Around the blue circle: “Your eyes will be upon the faithful of the land, and greet them with cherubim who glorifying God.”
- Around God the Father and outermost circle is the Hymn of Victory: “Holy, holy, holy, the glory of the Lord of Hosts is full of heaven and earth.”
- Around the innermost circle is the Greater Doxology: “Glory to God in the highest, and on earth peace, goodwill toward men.” (Luke 2:14)

== Controversy ==
The canonical status of this icon is disputed in the Russian Orthodox Church. Archpriest Alexander Andrievsky of the Tatarstan Metropolia states that since the All-Seeing Eye icon contains an image of God the Father (Lord Sabaoth), which was categorically forbidden by the Big Moscow Council of 1666-1667, it "can be considered non-canonical." The icon appeared in Russia in the late 18th to early 19th century through Western European cultural influence and is more commonly used among Old Believers than in mainstream Russian Orthodoxy.

== Gallery ==
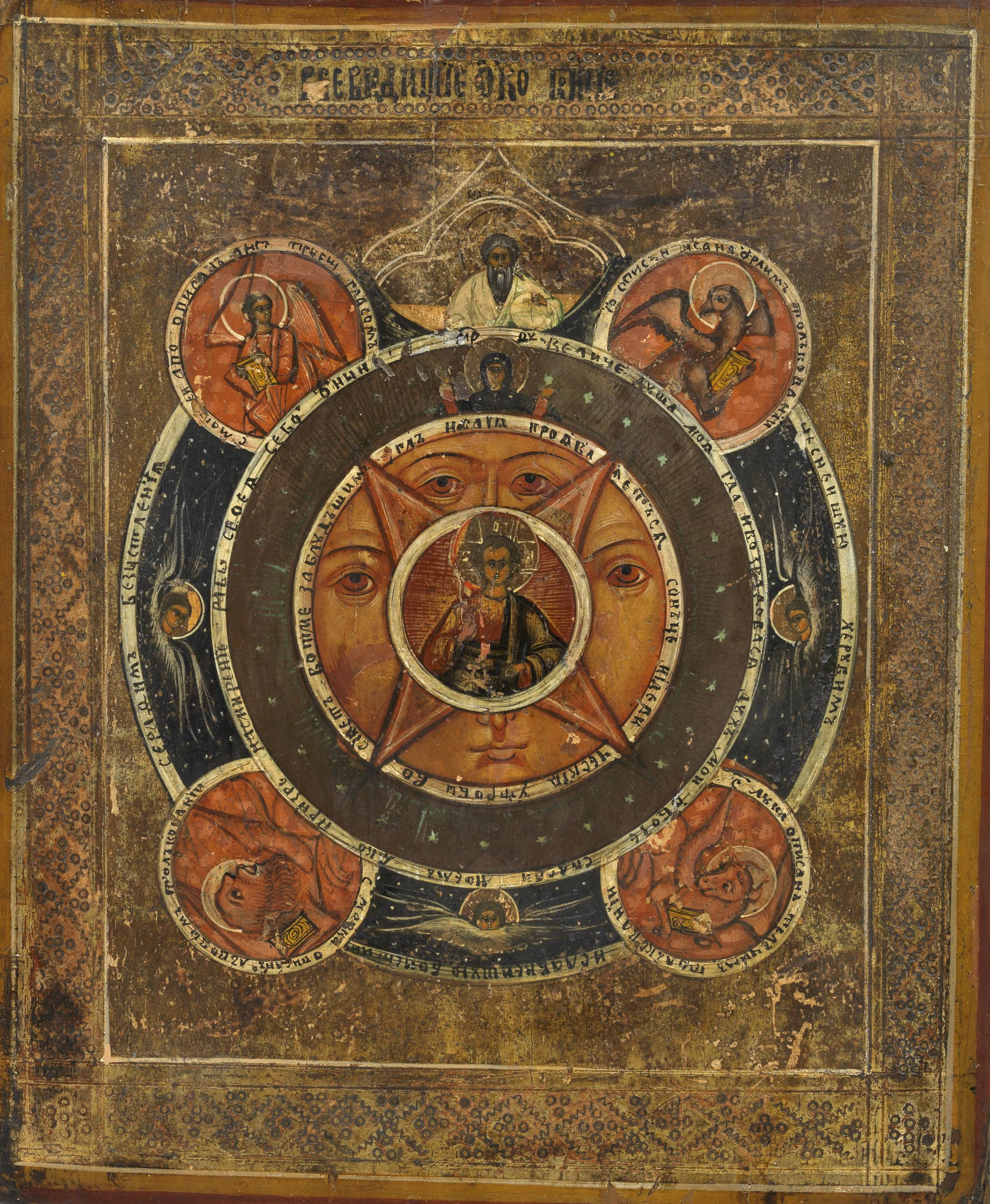

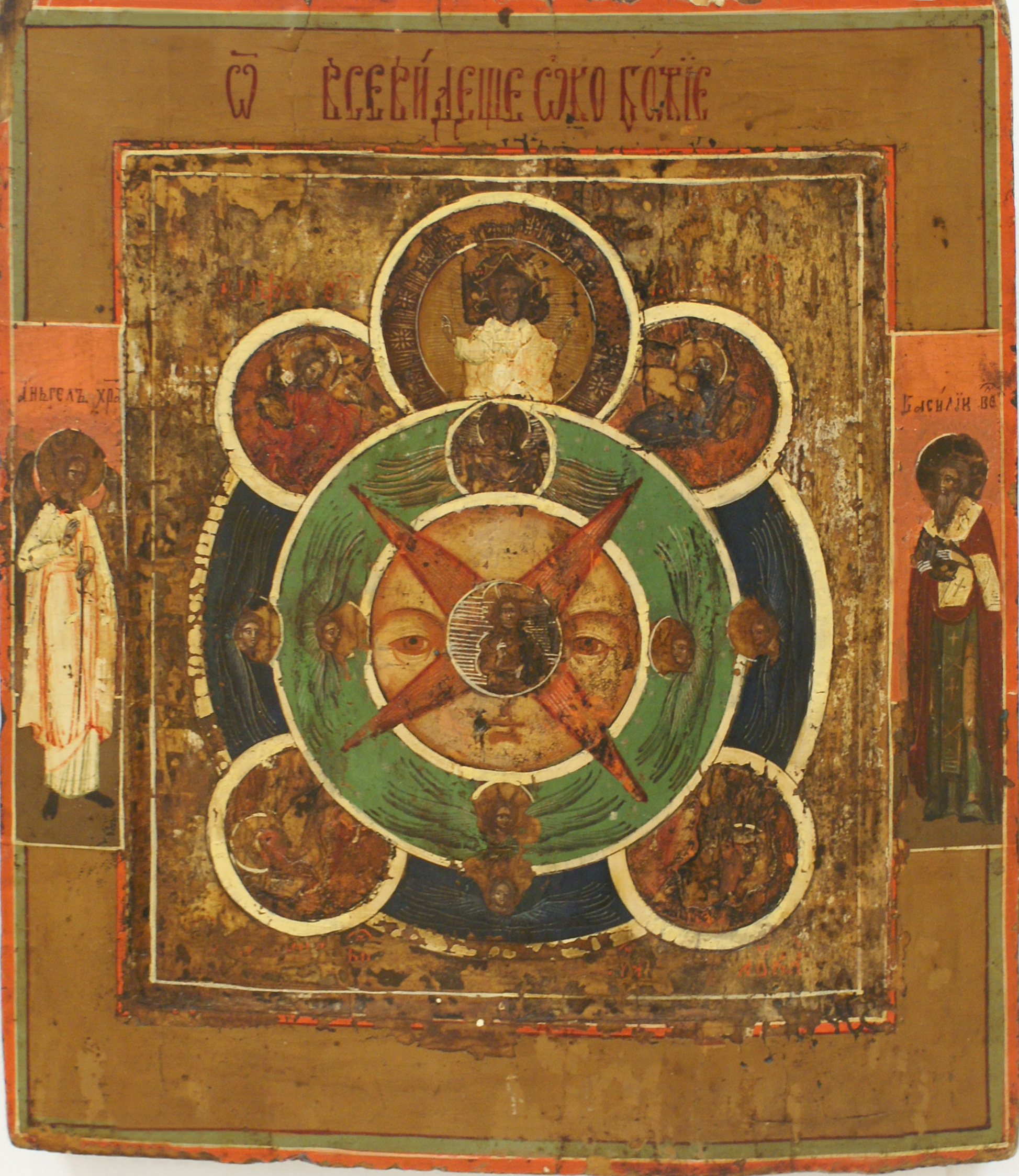

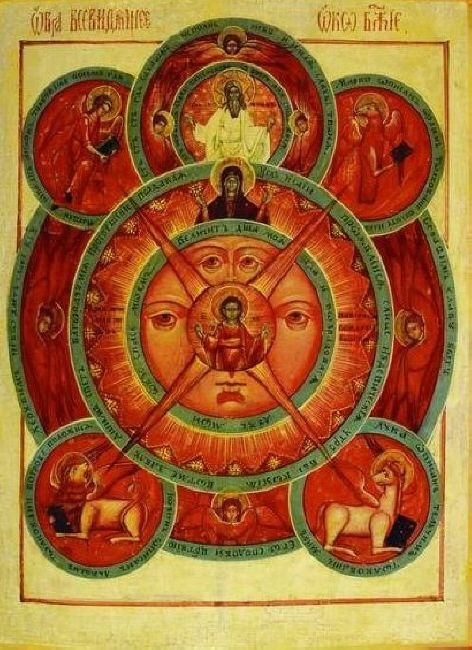
