= TeamSpeak =

Proprietary voice-over-Internet protocol software

- Developers: TeamSpeak Systems, Inc.
- Release: August 2001; 25 years ago
- Stable release: 3.6.2 / September 21, 2023; 3 years ago
- Preview release: 6.0.0-beta13 / September 17, 2026; 6 days ago
- Operating system: Linux, macOS, Microsoft Windows, iOS, FreeBSD (Server Only/no Client), Android
- Type: VoIP Software
- License: Proprietary, freeware
- Website: www.teamspeak.com

TeamSpeak (TS) is a proprietary voice-over-Internet Protocol (VoIP) application service for audio communication between users on a chat channel, much like a telephone conference call. The client software connects to a TeamSpeak server of the user's choice, from which the user may join chat channels. Users typically use headphones with a microphone; the target audience for TeamSpeak is gamers, who can use the software to communicate with other players on the same team of a multiplayer video game.

== Server ==
TeamSpeak servers runs as dedicated servers on Linux, macOS, Microsoft Windows and FreeBSD and use a client based user interface or a command-line interface to control server administration and configuration. TeamSpeak clients are available for Linux, macOS, Windows, Android, and iOS — both 32-bit and 64-bit architecture.

The TeamSpeak 3 and 6 servers can be used at no cost for up to 32 slots (simultaneous users). For non-commercial use on Teamspeak 3, non-profit licenses were available, until September 2018, that allowed to use the server with up to 512 slots. With it, server admins can choose to split up the slots into multiple virtual server instances (up to 2).

Beginning from September 2018, the non-profit license was discontinued for the new license system.

It splits the licenses into three categories:

Name	Max. simultaneous users	Price	Max. Virtual Servers
Free Server License	32	Free	1
Gamer License	64-1024	$55–$500	1-2
Commercial License	-	-	-

The commercial license is for "Companies/Businesses, who look for an internal voice communication solution".

== TeamSpeak Client ==
On Monday, 14th October 2019, TeamSpeak announced a fully rebuilt version of their client software. Originally dubbed TeamSpeak 5 (with the name TeamSpeak 4 rumored to have been avoided due to tetraphobia), their new client has been released without a version number, and is just called "TeamSpeak".

The new client added several features to its services, including a global chat feature, a responsive user interface, free voice servers, and upgraded audio functions.

=== TeamSpeak 3 ===
TeamSpeak 3 development began in 2004. It was a complete rewrite of TS2 with many new features, but has had infrequent updates on the development blog, and was first estimated to be released in mid-2006. The first public release of the TeamSpeak 3 SDK was on June 5, 2008, with the integrated solution in the MMO game Vendetta Online. Open beta of TeamSpeak 3 was released on December 9, 2009. Open beta was closed on August 10, 2011 and replaced with TeamSpeak 3.0.0 Final, which was the first stable release of TeamSpeak 3.

TeamSpeak 3 introduced the use of unique IDs, maintained in the program as identities, that are randomly generated at the time of a client's initial setup. An identity contains a nickname, which can be changed at any time, the Unique ID and an identity name, which is not visible to other users on the server. The unique id is used by the server to grant permissions to the user. Unique IDs replaced the need for a user to register with the server to keep their user group, be it a channel group or a server group.

=== Teamspeak 5 ===
Released as a beta in 2020, TeamSpeak 5 builds upon the foundation of its predecessor, TeamSpeak 3, offering enhanced features, modernized design, and improved usability.

=== Teamspeak 6 ===
TeamSpeak 6 was released as beta on January 21, 2025, introducing major new features like screen sharing and the ability to purchase hosted servers directly through the app.

=== Permissions system ===
When TeamSpeak 3 was first introduced in the Open Beta release, the server administrators were confronted with a major change in granting administrative powers to users, in the way of a permissions system based on boolean and integer, which permitted better user control.

The permissions system has two types of integer-based permissions: Power and Needed Power. The Power is the power level in numbers that the group/user has for that permission. The Needed Power is the power level in numbers needed by the group/user to use that specific permission. If the Power level is lower than the Needed Power level then the permission cannot be used. If the Power level is equal to or higher than the Needed Power level then the group/user will be able to use it.

TeamSpeak 3 also has a 5-tier hierarchy within its permissions system: Server Group, Client Permissions, Channel Permissions, Channel Groups and Channel Client Permissions. The five are used to override another type, also known as inheriting. This allows for highly complex permissions for users, giving users more powers and uses in TeamSpeak without giving away complete control to the users of the server.

With the release of later versions the TeamSpeak developers created easier ways to set up permissions in the way of a "Standard Permissions Display" by default in the client. This placed the original permissions system display behind the "Standard" one calling it "Advanced Permissions Display". This allowed beginners more ease of use when setting up a TeamSpeak 3 server. Some still prefer the Advanced system because it allows more control over which permissions get changed, whereas the Standard changes many permissions at the same time.

=== Update mechanism ===
TeamSpeak uses an incremental update system that only downloads the files that need to be updated between releases, resulting in less bandwidth usage and faster installation.

=== Audio quality ===
It is possible to boost the microphone volume by applying software-based gain; however, this is at the loss of audio quality. Low THD hardware and dual-microphone noise suppression help clean up the noisefloor to allow software-base gain with less of an impact to audio quality.

== In popular culture ==
TeamSpeak was mentioned numerous times within South Park's episode titled "Make Love, Not Warcraft" which aired on October 4, 2006 on Comedy Central.

== See also ==
- Comparison of VoIP software
- Discord
- Mumble
- Roger Wilco
- Skype
- Ventrilo
- Xfire
