= GameSpy =

American video game company

- Type: Subsidiary
- Founded: 1999; 27 years ago
- Founder: Mark Surfas
- Defunct: February 21, 2013
- Fate: GameSpy Industries acquired by Glu Mobile, site acquired by Ziff Davis and shut down
- Key people: Mark Surfas (CEO)
- Products: Video games
- Owner: IGN Entertainment
- Website: gamespy.com

GameSpy was an American provider of online multiplayer and matchmaking middleware for video games founded in 1995 by Mark Surfas. After the release of a multiplayer server browser for Quake, QSpy, Surfas licensed the software under the GameSpy brand to other video game publishers through a newly established company, GameSpy Industries, which also incorporated his Planet Network of video game news and information websites, and GameSpy.com.

GameSpy merged with IGN in 2004; by 2014, its services had been used by over 800 video game publishers and developers since its launch. In August 2012, the GameSpy Industries division (which remained responsible for the GameSpy service) was acquired by mobile video game developer Glu Mobile. IGN (then owned by News Corporation) retained ownership of the GameSpy.com website. In February 2013, IGN's new owner, Ziff Davis, shut down IGN's "secondary" sites, including GameSpy's network. This was followed by the announcement in April 2014 that GameSpy's service platform would be shut down on May 31, 2014.

== History ==
The 1996 release of id Software's video game Quake, one of the first 3D multiplayer action games to allow play over the Internet, furthered the concept of players creating and releasing "mods" or modifications of games. Mark Surfas saw the need for hosting and distribution of these mods and created PlanetQuake, a Quake-related hosting and news site. The massive success of mods catapulted PlanetQuake to huge traffic and a central position in the burgeoning game website scene.

Quake also marked the beginning of the Internet multiplayer real-time action game scene. However, finding a Quake server on the Internet proved difficult, as players could only share IP addresses of known servers between themselves or post them on websites. To solve this problem, a team of three programmers (consisting of Joe "QSpy" Powell, Tim Cook, and Jack "morbid" Matthews) formed Spy Software and created QSpy (or QuakeSpy). This allowed the listing and searching of Quake servers available across the Internet. Surfas licensed QSpy and became the official distributor and marketer while retaining the original programming team. QSpy became QuakeSpy and went on to be bundled with its QuakeWorld update – an unprecedented move by a top tier developer and huge validation for QuakeSpy. With the release of the Quake engine-based game Hexen II, QuakeSpy added this game to its capabilities and was renamed GameSpy3D. In 1997 Mark Surfas licensed GameSpy 3D from Spy Software, and created GameSpy Industries.

In 1999, GameSpy received angel investment funding from entrepreneur David Berkus. The company released MP3Spy.com (later renamed RadioSpy.com), a software browser allowing people to browse and connect to online radio feeds, such as those using Nullsoft's ShoutCast. GameSpy received $3 million in additional funding from the Yucaipa Companies, an investment group headed by Hollywood agent Michael Ovitz and Southern California supermarket billionaire Ronald Burkle.

The expanding of the company's websites included the games portal, GameSpy.com, created in October 1999; the Planet Network (also known as the GameSpy Network), a collection of "Planet" websites devoted to popular video games (such as Planet Quake, Planet Half-Life and Planet Unreal) as well as the genre-related websites, 3DActionPlanet, RPGPlanet, SportPlanet and StrategyPlanet; ForumPlanet, the network's extensive message board system; and FilePlanet, which was one of the largest video game file download sites. It also included platform-specific sites (e.g., Planet PS2, Planet Xbox, Planet Nintendo and Planet Dreamcast), but these were consolidated into GameSpy.com; only Classic Gaming remains separate. ForumPlanet and FilePlanet were services offered by GameSpy, and were not part of the Planet Network.

In 2000, GameSpy received additional investment funding from the Ziff Davis publishing division ZDNet.com and from Guillemot Corporation. GameSpy shut down its RadioSpy division, backing away from the online music market which was dominated by peer-to-peer applications such as Napster and Gnutella. In 2001, GameSpy's corporate technology business grew to include software development kits and middleware for video game consoles, such as Sony's PlayStation 2, Sega's Dreamcast and Microsoft's Xbox. In March 2007, IGN and GameSpy Industries merged, and was briefly known as IGN/GameSpy before formalizing their corporate name as IGN Entertainment.

Also in 2000, GameSpy turned GameSpy3D into GameSpy Arcade and purchased RogerWilco, MPlayer.com and various assets from HearMe; the MPlayer service was shut down and the RogerWilco technology is improved and incorporated into GameSpy Arcade. GameSpy Arcade was the company's flagship matchmaking software, allowing users to find servers for different online video games (whether they be free or purchased) and connect the user to game servers of that game. GameSpy also published the Roger Wilco voice chat software, primarily meant for communication and co-ordination in team-oriented games, where users join a server to chat with other users on the server using voice communication. This software rivaled the other major voice chat software Ventrilo and Teamspeak. The company's "Powered by GameSpy" technology enabled online functionality in over 300 PC and console games. In 2005, GameSpy added the PlayStation Portable, and Nintendo DS to its stable supported platforms. In March 2007, GameSpy added the Wii as another supported platform.

=== Shutdown ===
GameSpy Industries (the entity responsible for GameSpy multiplayer services) was bought from IGN Entertainment by Glu Mobile in August 2012, and proceeded in December to raise integration costs and shut down servers for many older games, including Fairytale Fights, Star Wars: Battlefront, Sniper Elite, Microsoft Flight Simulator X, Saints Row 2, and Neverwinter Nights, with no warning to developers or players, much to the outrage of communities of those games. GameSpy Technologies remained operational as a separate entity since. In February 2013, following the acquisition of IGN Entertainment by Ziff Davis, IGN's "secondary" sites were shut down, ending GameSpy's editorial operations.

In April 2014, Glu announced that it would shut down the GameSpy servers on May 31, 2014, so its developers could focus on work for Glu's own services. Games that still used GameSpy are no longer able to offer online functionality or multiplayer services through GameSpy. While some publishers announced plans to migrate GameSpy-equipped games to other platforms (such as Steam or in-house servers), other publishers, such as Nintendo (who used the GameSpy servers as the basis of its Nintendo Wi-Fi Connection platform for DS and Wii games) did not, particularly due to the age of the affected games. Electronic Arts, in particular, announced 24 PC games, including titles such as Battlefield 2, the Crysis series, Saints Row 2 and the Star Wars: Battlefront series, would be affected by the end of GameSpy service.

Fan-created mods restored online functionality with alternative servers. One such mod for the PC version of Halo was officially incorporated into a patch for the game released by Bungie in May 2014, and Disney helped developers create a similar mod for Battlefront II (2005) in 2017. 10 days prior to the Nintendo Wi-Fi Connection shutdown, a fan continuation of the project was created named Wiimmfi. By contrast, in 2017, Electronic Arts demanded the takedown of modified versions of Battlefield 2 and Battlefield 2142 on alternate servers, distributed by a group known as "Revive Network", as infringement of their copyrights.

== The GameSpy Debriefings ==
The GameSpy Debriefings
- Genre: Video games, comedy
- Language: English

Cast and voices
- Hosted by: Anthony Gallegos, Ryan Scott (previous host: Patrick Joynt)

Production
- Length: 50–60 minutes

Technical specifications
- Audio format: MP3

Publication
- No. of episodes: 170
- Original release: May 11, 2007 – July 30, 2011
- Provider: GameSpy
- Updates: Fridays

Related
- Website: RSS Feed

The GameSpy Debriefings was a party-style discussion between editors of GameSpy and IGN Entertainment on (purportedly) that week's gaming news. The GameSpy Debriefings was the 25th most popular podcast under the category "Games and Hobbies" on iTunes (as of May 1, 2011). It was however infamous for the crew's frequent propensity to de-rail the conversation from video games into explicit content or in-depth discussions about nerd culture.

The main crew at the show's conclusion of The GameSpy Debriefings consisted of:

- Anthony Gallegos, then of IGN Entertainment, previously of 1UP.com, Electronic Gaming Monthly, and GameSpy
- Ryan Scott, then of GameSpy, previously the executive editor for the 1UP.com Network's reviews department, and the reviews editor for both Computer Gaming World and Games for Windows: The Official Magazine
- Scott Bromley, formerly of IGN Entertainment
- Brian Altano, Humor Editor and graphic designer for IGN.com/GameSpy

Frequent guests included:

- Arthur Gies, formerly of IGN Entertainment
- Brian Miggels, formerly of IGN Entertainment and GameSpy
- Will Tuttle, former Editor-In-Chief of GameSpy
- Jack DeVries, former Editor of GameSpy

On July 30, 2011, The GameSpy Debriefings ended with an episode consisting of only the main crew. Following its conclusion, they launched a fundraising drive on Kickstarter which resulted in the release of their own popular podcast, The Comedy Button. The Comedy Button is similar in content to the later GameSpy Debriefings, with a renewed focus on humorous discussions and listener e-mails rather than the in-depth discussion of recent video games like the early Debriefings.

As of 2023, The Comedy Button ended with 550 episodes being produced.
