= Frontlines: Fuel of War =

2008 video game

- Developers: Kaos Studios; N-Fusion Interactive
- Publisher: THQ
- Composer: Matthew Harwood
- Engine: Unreal Engine 3
- Platforms: Microsoft Windows; Xbox 360
- Release: NA: February 25, 2008; EU: February 29, 2008; AU: March 6, 2008
- Genre: First-person shooter
- Modes: Single-player, multiplayer

Frontlines: Fuel of War is a first-person shooter video game developed by Kaos Studios and released for Microsoft Windows and Xbox 360 in February 2008. It was also in development for the PlayStation 3, although THQ canceled this version in January 2008, seemingly as a result of problems with developing for the console.

Frontlines includes a multiplayer mode as well as a single-player campaign that uses the Frontlines system found in the multiplayer component. Single-player mode limits the players to the fictional Western Coalition, while online modes let players play as either the Western Coalition (WC) or Red Star Alliance (RSA). Towards the end of 2012, the PC online multiplayer mode of the game was no longer available, although the LAN mode still operates.

The game received generally favorable reviews.

== Gameplay ==
Gameplay example, PC version

The gameplay focuses on a central mechanic: the frontline. This is designed to keep the action in one place, by focusing objectives closer together on the battlefield. The frontline also has bonuses. By moving it back and forth across the battlefield, the player may gain or lose weapons and equipment. The frontline mechanic is used in all game types, which forces players to choose which objectives they will pursue or defend, adding a strategic level to the gameplay.

The UCAV Drone plays a crucial role in gathering information in real time on the battlefield. The drone reconnoiters enemy units, which are visible through walls, and then shows them on the player's HUD and map. Some drones can also be used as a kamikaze bomb, by running them into enemy infantry and self-destructing them.

There are four other drones: the Assault Drone, a small treaded vehicle with a mounted Gatling gun; a Mortar Drone, with a mounted four-barreled mortar; an RC drone, which can be packed with C4 and used to destroy armored targets; and finally, a variant of the UAV drone equipped with anti-infantry rockets.

In an interview, Kaos stated that there would be more than 60 vehicles and weapons in the final game. Airstrikes will also play a large part in gameplay, being an effective way to destroy an opposing force from a distance.

In an interview with developer Joe Halper, Kaos had stated that 32-player multiplayer would be supported for the console version. Near release, the maximum player count was raised to 50. The PC version of the game supports 64 players online. Near release, it was confirmed that the game would not support cross-platform play, but the developers have stated that they are considering eventually moving the franchise towards becoming a Live Anywhere title.

=== Maps ===
Frontlines shipped with a total of eight multiplayer maps. These maps range in size and location from a small city block to a solar array over 4 square miles (10 km^{2}) in size. Kaos Studios stated they were looking into releasing extra maps in the future as downloadable content.

This began with the brand-new map: "Boneyard". The map was released as a free download on Xbox 360's Marketplace. The map not only offered another well-sized map, but it also offered more weapons and vehicles. This included an all-new Automatic Shotgun, a Carrier Helicopter for the Red Star Alliance, and a "Rocket Jeep".

In addition, the downloadable content clearly stated that this new map was the first of five to be released. The other four maps are named "Sunder", "Wide Awake", "Hind Sight", and "Infiltration". On September 19, Kaos released these maps on Xbox Live. These were later released for the PC as a free download patch.

=== Dedicated servers ===
The game features dedicated servers similar to Battlefield 2: Modern Combat, as well as client-side hosting found in the majority of Live-enabled Xbox 360 games. This is done in order to support the 50-player limit, which was unprecedented on the console. The dedicated servers have been shut down as of August 31, 2011. Although client-side hosting is still available, servers can only support a 16-player maximum.

== Synopsis ==
In 2005, a global energy crisis, known as “The Long Emergency,” began when global peak oil extraction was reached. This is coupled with the start of a worldwide avian influenza outbreak in 2009, a massive global recession in 2012, and with uncontrollable climate change displacing millions. Following a three-way nuclear war between Israel, Iran, and Saudi Arabia that renders the Middle East largely uninhabitable in 2014, alternative energies such as solar power, biofuel, and nuclear energy remain insufficient to completely replace the global dependence on oil. As a consequence, diplomatic relations between the East and West deteriorated, leading to the emergence of two new superpowers: the Red Star Alliance, an evolution of the Shanghai Cooperation Organisation in 2015, and the Western Coalition, an evolution of an expanded European Union and NATO, including Afghanistan, Pakistan, and India in 2016. In 2024, Red Star forces launch a surprise attack on the Western Coalition in retaliation for evidence that the Coalition supported a coup d’état in the oil-rich Red Star member nation Turkmenistan in 2021. As the last oil fields in the Caspian Sea begin to dry up, the superpowers scramble to secure what resources remain, triggering several small outbreaks that quickly escalate into full-scale war.

The player steps in the shoes of the members of a violent and battle-hardened Western Coalition strike force nicknamed the "Stray Dogs" that are to spearhead assaults against defensive positions of Red Star across Central Asia and Eastern Europe, as Red Star tries to secure resources in the best of worldwide interest. Wayne Andrews, a reporter for the Affiliated Press throughout the game, joins the Stray Dogs. The game ends after the final mission entitled "History Repeats," upon bringing the Russian military to a collapse and cutting the nation off from the rest of the world by destroying a satellite uplink. As pockets of resistance are hunted down by Coalition forces across Moscow, a questionable future is proposed by Andrews, stating that the Russians are forming a government in exile, and Chinese troops are amassing on the border. In the final cutscene, Andrews states that he wishes to live to see humanity begin anew and manage to solve the energy crisis with more research on alternatives like nuclear fusion. The game ends by showing Red Star fighter jets opening fire on Andrews, leaving the story open for a sequel.

== Development ==
=== Downloadable content ===
As well as gamer pictures and three Frontlines themes for the Xbox 360 dashboard, along with various gameplay videos from the developers, a new game mode was released for download. Called "Conquer," it allows the game to be played like Battlefield 2: Modern Combat, in that instead of trying to push the Frontline forward, all spawn points are available for capture by both teams. To win, one team must capture all points on the map, and eliminate the other team.

== Retail bonuses ==
A Collector's Edition of the game was released in the UK, Australia, Denmark, and New Zealand. The Xbox 360 Collector's Edition contained a T-shirt, an Art of Frontlines book, a poster, and a bonus disk containing the game sound, behind-the-scenes videos, and more. The PC Collector's Edition contained an official strategy guide, Stray Dogs insignia patch, a deck of Frontlines playing cards, an Art of Frontlines book, a poster, and a SteelBook case. This edition was never released in North America. In Denmark, the PC Collector's Edition contained a "Stray Dogs" T-shirt, an art book, a CD with the soundtrack and a 60-by-42cm poster and sold as a Special Edition instead of Collector's Edition.

Players who ordered Frontlines: Fuel of War from GameStop or Best Buy were given a special code which gave access to one of two Challenge Maps. This code has since been distributed on the Internet. Players who purchased Frontlines: Fuel of War from Circuit City received a copy of the Frontlines: Fuel of War soundtrack. Players who ordered Frontlines from online retailer Amazon.com were given a limited-edition collector's tin.

=== Alternate reality game ===
THQ announced the launch of an alternate reality game for Frontlines: Fuel of War in order to promote the game via a website. Visitors are challenged to unearth the mystery surrounding Exeo Incorporated by finding ten passwords scattered across the Internet. Users who find all 10 passwords were eligible to win a grand prize, including fighter pilot training, and a complimentary copy of the game.
