= Game server =

Source of a multiplayer video game

A game server (also sometimes referred to as a host) is a server which is the authoritative source of events in a multiplayer video game. The server transmits enough data about its internal state to allow its connected clients to maintain their own accurate version of the game world for display to players. They also receive and process each player's input.

Private servers often host massively multiplayer online role-playing game genre games such as World of Warcraft, RuneScape, and MapleStory. These servers can attempt to provide a "stock"/standard experience, or can modify gameplay to change the difficulty, pace of character progress, available content, or available controls over the gameplay environment.

Rightsholding companies often attempt to and succeed in shutting down private server versions of their games. Between this and potential for operators to lose interest, private servers can be short-lived. However, there are also cases of games no longer being operated by the rightsholders, in which case a private server may have greater longevity than the sanctioned, defunct service.

Due to how private servers for games are often reverse-engineered and operated using incomplete information about the complete inner workings of the original game, it is common for standard featuresets to be incomplete or for the server to be less stable than an original. On the other hand, it is common for homebrewed features to be added by operators.

== Private servers (broadly defined) ==
As servers need adequate internet connection, power and can be noisy, they are often located in a colocation center. Servers are available on the market the same way as laptops or desktops are available and can be purchased by individuals already pre-configured. Ordinary desktop computers are not suitable to house in colocation centers as servers have specific form factors that allows them to fit many into a standard rack. This group also includes custom-designed experimental servers, made by hobbyists. Virtual servers also offer high degree of freedom, superuser access and low-cost service.

== Types ==
=== Dedicated server ===
Dedicated servers simulate game worlds without supporting direct input or output, except that required for their administration. Players must connect to the server with separate client programs in order to see and interact with the game.

The foremost advantage of dedicated servers is their suitability for hosting in professional data centers, with all of the reliability and performance benefits that entails. Remote hosting also eliminates lagging advantage that would otherwise be held by any player who hosts and connects to a server from the same machine or local network.

The cost to operate dedicated servers is sometimes met by a game's developers (particularly on consoles) and sometimes by clan groups, but in either case, the public is reliant on third parties providing servers to connect to. For this reason, most games which use dedicated servers also provide listen server support. Players of these games will oftentimes host servers for the public and their clans, either by hosting a server instance from their own hardware, or by renting from a game server hosting provider.

==== Components of a dedicated game server ====
A dedicated game server is essentially similar to any other modern computer in its physical components. They generally use typical server-oriented parts for most of their components except the CPU- motherboards, memory, storage, and so on. Since game server performance is typically limited by a handful of key processes that parallelize poorly, dedicated servers for modern games commonly use high-end consumer CPUs for their very high single-threaded performance, with each machine running a few or even just one instance.

==== Shared hardware for game servers ====
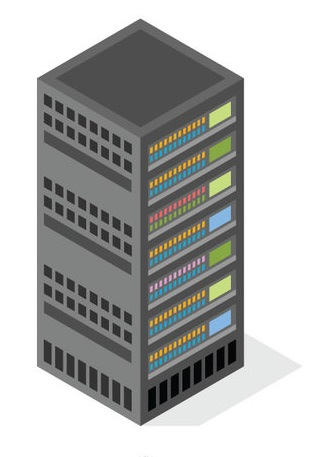
A typical server tower

Dedicated game servers are often rented from a hosting provider; for less demanding games or those with lower player counts, when single-threaded performance requirements are no longer at the uttermost limits of current technology, a single physical server may host dozens or hundreds of instances. These run on typical compute server hardware, including a manycore CPU and very high memory capacity. In most cases, they are rented out per-instance, with the rates depending on how many CPU cores and how much memory and storage is required for each instance. This allows very affordable rates for clans or private individuals who only need a handful of instances, and allow publishers to scale their server count with their currently-active player count, only paying for the resources they actually need at any given time.

=== Listen server ===
Listen servers run in the same process as a game client. They otherwise function like dedicated servers, but typically have the disadvantage of having to communicate with remote players over the residential internet connection of the hosting player. Performance is also reduced by the simple fact that the machine running the server is also generating an output image. Furthermore, listen servers grant anyone playing on them directly a large latency advantage over other players and cease to exist when that player leaves the game.

However, listen servers have the advantage of being essentially free and not requiring any special infrastructure or forward planning to set up, which makes them common at LAN parties where latency and bandwidth issues are not a concern. They are also common in console games.

==== Host migration ====
In a listen server arrangement, "host migration" is a useful feature. Without host migration, if the player that is currently hosting disconnects for any reason (quitting, crashing, lost network connection, etc.), the current server stops functioning and gameplay ends. A host migration feature allows one of the other players to become designated as the new host, so that the game can continue.

=== Peer-to-peer ===
In the client/server model outlined elsewhere in this article, clients receive processed data from the server and display it without much thought. In the alternative "peer-to-peer" model there is no server: each "peer" instead receives the raw input streams of each other player and determines the results itself.

Peer-to-peer is generally considered obsolete for action games, but it is still common in the real-time strategy genre due to its suitability for games with large numbers of tokens and small numbers of players. Instead of constantly transmitting the positions of 1000 troops, the game can make a one-off transmission of the fact that 1000 troops are selected and that the player in command of them just issued a move order.

However, peer-to-peer has many disadvantages:

- It is very difficult to keep all peers synchronized. Minute differences between peers can escalate over time to game-breaking paradoxes.
- It is very difficult to support new peers joining part-way through a game.
- Each peer must communicate with all other peers, limiting the number of connected players.
- Each peer must wait for every other peer's message before simulating the next "network frame", resulting in all players experiencing the same latency as the player with the worst connection.

=== Listen-peer ===
Multiple listen servers collectively peer amongst themselves for listen-peer setting. This type of setting avoids the disadvantages of peer-to-peer communications among all clients and is a better alternative to dedicated servers for increased number of clients.

== Tickrate ==
The rate at which a game server runs simulation steps is commonly referred to as its "tickrate". A "tick" is a number associated with each simulation step which is broadcast to clients to help them synchronise with the server.

There are three reasons to limit the frequency of server simulation steps to a predefined tickrate: to conserve server and client bandwidth, to conserve server CPU time, and to allow clients to be certain of how much time has elapsed between each tick. The last point is important for internet games, as network updates from the server can arrive at different intervals or even an incorrect order.

== Customization ==
Servers, particularly those of PC games, can generally be customized in ways that still allow unaltered clients to connect to them. These customizations can include tweaks to built-in game settings, content that is downloaded by clients when they join the game, and new code which changes the way that the server behaves.

While server customization is popular with server administrators and players, it can be at odds with the desire of developers and other players for the game to be experienced as intended. It can also aggravate players by enabling abusive administrators to lie about what their server offers.

== Game server infrastructure ==
A game server is a server used by multiplayer video games to synchronize game state and facilitate communication between players. Server architectures vary depending on the game and may include dedicated servers, listen servers, peer-to-peer systems, and cloud-hosted infrastructure.

Modern multiplayer games may distribute server infrastructure across multiple geographic regions in order to reduce network latency for players. The number of individual server instances can also change dynamically depending on player demand.

== See also ==
- Matchmaking – Process of connecting players together for online play sessions
