= Matchmaking (video games) =

Process of connecting players together for online play sessions

In multiplayer video games, matchmaking is the process of connecting players together for online play sessions.

== Playlists ==
Playlists are automatically managed streams of online play sessions that players can join and leave at will. A set of predefined rules is used to determine the configuration of each session without the need for human input.

Games will normally offer a choice of themed playlists (e.g. teams or solo, quirky rulesets, etc.) to suit different tastes or moods. Since playlists are handled by servers controlled by the game's developer, it is possible for them to be changed over time.

When a player selects a playlist, they join a pool of other people who have made the same choice. The playlist server then either connects them to an existing session or creates a new one.

== Parties ==
Parties are groups of players who are treated as a single entity by matchmaking systems. A party can skip from session to session without its players becoming separated from each other. The concept is particularly well suited to playlists, which can automatically handle the logistics of finding or creating play sessions with enough room for the whole group.

== Lobbies ==
Lobbies are menu screens where players can inspect the upcoming game session, examine the results of the last, change their settings, and talk to each other.

In many games, players return to the lobby at the end of each session. In some, players joining a session that has already started are placed in the lobby until the start of the next. As lobbies consume very few resources they are sometimes additionally used as a "holding pen" for players while a suitable host for the coming session is found.

Lobbies created by playlists often have a countdown timer before the session starts, while lobbies created by a player generally transition at that player's discretion.

== Ranking ==
Many matchmaking systems feature a ranking system that attempts to match players of roughly equal ability together. One such example of this is Xbox Live's TrueSkill system.

Games such as League of Legends use divisions and tiers for their matchmaking rating system. Each player competes in a variety of tiers : Iron, Bronze, Silver, Gold, Platinum, Emerald, Diamond, Master, Grandmaster, Challenger and each win will reward you with League Points, each loss deducts League Points.

Games with ranking will usually offer unranked sessions for players who do not want their performance to be recorded and analysed. These are kept separate so that ranked and unranked players do not mix. Video games such as League of Legends, Counter-Strike: Global Offensive, Rocket League and Brawlhalla rely on a rating system in their rank matchmaking games.

== Server browsers ==
The cross-game server browser offered by Steam

Some games (particularly those with dedicated servers) present a list of active sessions to players and allow them to manually select one. This system can be used in conjunction with ranking and lobbies, but is frustrated by the on-demand session creation of playlists.

Most of these server browsers allow players to filter the results they provide. Common filter criteria include server name, player count, game mode, and latency. Server browsers were widely utilized in the late 2000s to early 2010s, but their prevalence gradually declined in the late 2010s as emphasis shifted toward automated matchmaking systems.

== Contacts lists ==
One of the most basic and common forms of matchmaking is providing players with a list of other players who they have met previously and might want to play with again. Each player's status (offline, online, playing) is shown, the option to join a session in progress is given, and generally it is possible to send chat messages.

In many cases, contacts lists are managed by the platform that a game runs on (e.g. Xbox Live, PlayStation Network, Steam) to save players the overhead of managing many separate lists for many individual games.

== Chat ==
In some online multiplayer games, there is a chat system in matchmaking where people can communicate with others across the globe. Chatting helps friends stay connected with one another, talk about strategy, and befriend others to keep the game more fun. Usually, there is the possibility to chat with your party. In most cases, there is also a "team" and an "all" chat.

== History ==
The earliest online games, such as Doom, required players to exchange their personal IP addresses. With Quake, these evolved into more permanent dedicated server addresses and an address book was added to the game's menu to store them, but finding the IPs in the first place remained a very involved process.

Players stepped in by listing servers on their clan websites. In 1996, this process became automated with the first server browsers: one integrated into Diablo via Battle.net, the other a desktop application for Quake players called QSpy (which became GameSpy Arcade). In both cases, a "master server" stored and transmitted a list of IPs; Diablo also featured a contacts list. Server browsers made online gaming easy for the first time and its popularity grew rapidly as a result.

Matchmaking saw its next major evolution with the release of Halo 2 in 2004. The clan culture needed to support dedicated servers had not made the leap to consoles, and expecting players to self-host had proved limiting. Halo 2 resolved the issue by automating the self-hosting process with the twin concepts of playlists and parties, a system which proved so successful that it quickly became the second industry standard for matchmaking.

Blizzard Entertainment's video game StarCraft II has a "ladder" that uses MMR or matchmaking rating as a method of a promotion and relegation system, where individual players and pre-made teams can be promoted and relegated during the first few weeks of a league season, which generally lasts around 11 weeks, with promotion and relegation taking place based on a skill rating, which is in turn based on wins and losses. The MMR used to be hidden, but is now public.

Today, playlists are more common in console games, while server browsers are more common in PC games.

== See also ==
- Game server
- Latency (engineering)
- Online game
- Category:Game server browsers
