= List of Battlefield Friends episodes =

Battlefield Friends, often abbreviated as BFFs, is an American animated comedy web series created by Hank & Jed Movie Pictures and originally distributed by Machinima before becoming an independent series published on YouTube by Neebs Gaming. The show is based on the video game series Battlefield by Electronic Arts and features an ensemble voice cast starring Brent Triplett, Jon Etheridge, Tony Schnur and Nate Panning. The show centers on a group of four friends — Noob, Engineer, Recon and Medic — as they get into various comedic scenarios while playing Battlefield. Each character is based on a Battlefield 3 multiplayer class aside from Noob, who is a stereotype of inexperienced players in the game.

During the show's time under Machinima, episodes would air weekly through the main network or the company's Happy Hour block channel. Between seasons five and six, episodes would air early on the streaming service Vessel before it was bought and closed by Verizon on October 31, 2016. After the conclusion of the show's sixth season, Machinima was shut down by AT&T and all videos on the network were permanently set to private, including all previous episodes of Battlefield Friends. Hank & Jed Movie Pictures subsequently reuploaded all of the episodes to their gaming channel, Neebs Gaming, in 2021, and released an independent seventh season based on Battlefield 2042 a year later.

== Series overview ==
Season	Episodes	Originally released		Based on
Season	Episodes	First released	Last released	Based on
1	13	January 27, 2012	June 10, 2012	Battlefield 3
2	13	December 16, 2012	March 10, 2013	Battlefield 3
3	14	August 9, 2013	October 27, 2013	Battlefield 3
4	13	May 11, 2014	August 3, 2014	Battlefield 4
5	15	August 8, 2015	November 14, 2015	Battlefield 4 / Battlefield Hardline
6	15	October 1, 2016	January 7, 2017	Battlefield 4
7	6	January 14, 2022	August 19, 2022	Battlefield 2042

== Episodes ==
=== Battlefield 3 ===
==== Season 1 (2012) ====
No. overall	No. in season	Title	Episode length	Original release date
1	1	"First Flight"	1:53	January 27, 2012
When a group of friends jump into a helicopter in Battlefield 3, they quickly realize that it is being piloted by a noob, and are forced to reluctantly help him learn to fly.
2	2	"Silent Sniper"	2:08	March 23, 2012
Recon gets into position to take out an enemy tank crew with a sniper rifle, until Noob appears and compromises his mission through varying comedic gags.
3	3	"USAS-12 + Frags"	1:45	March 30, 2012
When Engineer gets his hands on a USAS-12, one of the most overpowered weapons in Battlefield 3, the group of friends argue whether it might be an unfair advantage.
4	4	"Revive"	1:58	April 6, 2012
When Noob and Engineer are pinned down by a team of enemies, Noob discovers the power of the defibrillator. In subsequent fashion, he spends the rest of the match reviving Engineer.
5	5	"Mine Games"	1:48	April 13, 2012
The group discover they are losing the battle, and head back to their base to figure out why. Eventually, they realize Noob and his friend Simon have been wasting time creating an elaborate landmine trap.
6	6	"Full Tank"	1:07	April 20, 2012
As the group prepare to charge into battle with a tank, Noob discovers that the vehicle only has 3 seats and attempts to join his crew on the mission.
7	7	"Join The Battle"	0:56	April 27, 2012
The squad load into a game of conquest on Caspian Border.
8	8	"Mortars"	2:09	May 4, 2012
As the team of friends plan a flank attack, they notice Noob is missing. Over the radio, they learn he has discovered how to place a mortar cannon to the dismay of a teammate who needs ammo.
9	9	"Vehicle Spawn"	2:48	May 11, 2012
As the squad figure out where to spawn, they reluctantly join Noob while he is driving a jeep. Through his strange behavior, they begin to discover that Noob has an ulterior motive.
10	10	"Claymore Specialist"	2:36	May 18, 2012
After Noob unlocks the Claymore Specialist ability, he places over a thousand claymores across the map. Upon learning this, the squad try to convince him that they clearly despawned.
11	11	"Administrator"	2:46	May 25, 2012
The squad meet the administrator of the Battlefield 3 server they are playing on, quickly realizing he has implemented ridiculous rules.
12	12	"Vehicle Waste"	2:09	June 1, 2012
The squad berate Noob after discovering he ejects from helicopters to get around the map.
13	13	"Colonel 100"	3:28	June 10, 2012
The team meet a max-level player, who teaches them the excessive methods he uses to play Battlefield without taking any breaks.

==== Season 2 (2012) ====
No. overall	No. in season	Title	Episode length	Original release date
14	1	"Chopper Expert"	1:58	December 16, 2012
In a nod to the show's pilot episode, the group run into a helicopter only to discover Noob as the pilot. Noob claims that he is far better at flying now, until an enemy missile locks onto their helicopter, sparking chaos.
15	2	"Rush"	2:25	December 23, 2012
Engineer attempts to arm the objective in Rush, until Noob offers to help out, ultimately making matters worse and self-sabotaging the team.
16	3	"Campers"	3:18	December 30, 2012
Noob and his friend Simon set up a sniper position in the mountains when the rest of the squad attempts to convince them to stop camping and provide ammo support.
17	4	"Cheap Shot"	2:36	January 6, 2013
The squad notice a prone enemy in a building when his legs clip through the wall. A subsequent discussion ensues whether it's ethical to kill an enemy this way.
18	5	"They Ruined Battlefield"	2:57	January 13, 2013
The group of friends encounter an elderly soldier who reminisces on the good old days, a parody of Battlefield players who hate game balance updates.
19	6	"Scavenger"	3:07	January 20, 2013
Recon and Engineer discuss the logistics of unlocking the crossbow through Scavenger Mode, while Noob talks on the phone to EA's customer service.
20	7	"Team Bagging"	2:34	January 27, 2013
The squad berate Noob for teabagging a dead teammate, while Engineer experiences internet lag.
21	8	"Closet Colonel"	3:03	February 3, 2013
A new self-proclaimed noob joins the game, claiming ignorance, until the team realize he is a closeted max-level player.
22	9	"Noob Fight"	2:55	February 10, 2013
The squad watch from a distance as Noob and Simon fight to the death.
23	10	"Stingers"	3:06	February 17, 2013
Engineer gets his hands on another overpowered weapon — the FIM-92 Stinger — as the group's argument over the ethics of using broken items continues.
24	11	"Killed by Admin"	2:55	February 24, 2013
When the squad go on a winning streak, they are forcefully added to the other team by the administrator to rig the game.
25	12	"LevelCap"	3:33	March 3, 2013
The squad joins a private match with the YouTuber LevelCap as he tries to give them lessons on how to get better at Battlefield, much to the dismay of Noob.
26	13	"Transport Chopper"	2:53	March 10, 2013
The group attempt to talk Noob out of the pilot seat of a transport helicopter. After Noob heads into the back seats to take control of a minigun, he gets bored due to poor visibility and throws C-4 out of the helicopter before jumping out himself. As Noob is parachuting down, the rest of the squad are attacked by Colonel 100 who stabs them all and hijacks the helicopter. Noob activates the C-4 detonator, expecting the objective below him to explode, only for the helicopter to blow up - killing Colonel 100 and promoting Noob to a higher level.

==== Season 3 (2013) ====
No. overall	No. in season	Title	Episode length	Original release date
27	1	"Capture the Flag"	2:32	June 9, 2013
Engineer captures the enemy's flag and catches a ride on Noob's motorcycle, slowly regretting it as Noob undertakes a personal side mission instead.
28	2	"Air Superiority"	2:46	June 16, 2013
The squad take to the skies in military fighter jets to gain air superiority over the other team. Glitches, enemies, and antics from Noob get in the way of their plan.
29	3	"Outta My Choppi"	2:45	June 23, 2013
Noob jumps into the air gunner seat of a teammate's attack helicopter, not realizing the player was waiting for their friend to enter instead.
30	4	"TeamSpeak"	3:19	June 30, 2013
In an attempt to communicate with the larger team, the squad have to figure out how to give orders through TeamSpeak while avoiding the chaotic nature of the software.
31	5	"Bad Bipod"	2:52	July 7, 2013
Medic asks Noob for cover fire while he sneaks into an enemy base, only to be continuously gunned down when Noob is distracted by a glitchy bipod.
32	6	"Take the Objective"	3:10	July 14, 2013
Noob is forced to fend for himself when he attempts to take the objective and his squad are not there.
33	7	"Left Behind"	1:23	July 21, 2013
At the start of a match, Noob decides to split off from the squad and take a helicopter, only to realize he's stranded at the base with no vehicles.
34	8	"Little Bird Battle"	2:25	July 28, 2013
Recon and Engineer take flight of an MH-6 Little Bird as they battle enemy helicopters and reach out for external help from Noob and Colonel 100.
35	9	"PC Elitist"	3:42	August 4, 2013
The squad get into a heated debate with a player who believes that PC gaming is superior to console gaming.
36	10	"Tugs Life"	2:50	August 11, 2013
Recon and Noob hear beeping from a nearby tactical unattended ground sensor (TUGS), and attempt to locate the source of the sound without getting caught. After disabling the TUGS, Recon places his own, prompting Colonel 100 to use the spots to wipe out enemies. Colonel 100 thanks Recon for the assist, and unlocks a bipod for his knife.
37	11	"Close Quarters"	2:14	August 18, 2013
The squad are in the heat of a close quarters battle with the enemy, while Noob is distracted by an art installation on the map.
38	12	"Girl Gamer"	3:20	August 25, 2013
A girl joins the team; prompting Engineer to flirt with her, Medic to play the nice guy, and Noob to be sexist. The episode is a parody of the various ways men discriminate against women in online video games.
39	13	"Spawn Killing"	3:21	September 1, 2013
The squad continuously spawn kill the enemy team, causing Medic to get mixed feelings about the fairness of doing so. The rest of the team chime in on the debate on whether to pull back and let the enemies take the objective or not. Note: This episode features guest appearances from various YouTubers, including LevelCap, ChaBoyyHD, Doom49, FrankieOnPCin1080p, AnderZEL, and XfactorGaming.
40	14	"Battlefield 4"	2:15	October 27, 2013
The squad prepare for the release of Battlefield 4 and discuss the incoming changes. Noob is convinced the game will include prehistoric creatures such as a Megalodon, telling people to get out of the waters, while the others write him off as a conspiracy theorist. A large boat crashes into the island as the squad celebrate by screaming "Levolution!", and are followed into battle by a dinosaur with a gun.

=== Battlefield 4 / Battlefield Hardline ===
==== Season 4 (2014) ====
No. overall	No. in season	Title	Episode length	Original release date
41	1	"Brokenfield"	3:50	May 11, 2014
As the squad log into Battlefield 4 after launch, they question if the issues with the servers and netcode have been fixed yet. A helicopter, piloted by Noob, crashes in front of them as Noob flexes the battle packs he owns. The group continues to complain about the game's complicated menus and glitches. Simon drives past in an invisible car. Medic and Recon convince Engineer to give the game a try, until they are immediately gunned down through a wall.
42	2	"Counter Knife"	2:30	May 18, 2014
Noob pulls off a counter-attack on a knife takedown and freaks out. As Engineer shows up, the pair get into an argument over Noob's obsession over a feature that Engineer sees as normal gameplay.
43	3	"Kill Cam"	3:14	May 25, 2014
The group complain about the game's killcam and the lack of information it gives the player, until Colonel 100 shows up and admits he's never seen it because he has never died. He reminisces on the one time he was killed; a callback to "Transport Chopper" when Noob inadvertently destroyed his helicopter. A tank shows up and kills the squad, with the killcam highlighting the tree instead of the tank.
44	4	"Recon C4"	3:17	June 1, 2014
Noob calls Recon over for a private chat, accusing him of stealing his "jeep stuff", referring to C-4. Recon attempts to persuade him that it was not stolen, and Noob has to unlock it for himself. Noob teamkills Recon and steals the C-4, before blowing up his corpse.
45	5	"YouTube Gamer"	3:05	June 8, 2014
Noob starts a gameplay channel on YouTube as the squad try to convince him that it is not an original idea. The group point out the amount of people already making gameplay videos, as JackFrags appears asking them to move out of the sightline of his camera. Simon and Noob praise creators such as "PumpkinPie", referring to PewDiePie, for getting over 20 million subscribers while playing video games. In a fourth-wall breaking joke, Engineer wonders why viewers prefer let's plays over high-quality content that "take weeks to create". The group are subsequently wiped out by LevelCap while he is recording a tutorial.
46	6	"Attack Boat"	3:22	June 15, 2014
The squad get an attack boat and begin mowing down enemies, when Noob joins and asks for a better view from his minigun. The team ask him to repair the boat, as Noob is adamant he is a gunner and not an engineer. While he figures out how to use the repair tool, Ammo Guy steals the gunner seat, and eventually Noob steals the drivers seat from Engineer. They crash onto land and beach the boat.
47	7	"Megalodon"	2:35	June 22, 2014
The group attempt to complete the Battlefield 4 easter egg that makes a Megalodon appear in the ocean. Noob joins them and asks what they are doing, learning that he was right all along about the existence of the easter egg; he hinted at it during the episode "Battlefield 4". When the squad complete the steps to make the shark appear, nothing happens. The group look into the distance and see the Megalodon hanging from a structure, realizing it has already been killed and displayed by Colonel 100.
48	8	"Mobile AA"	2:36	June 29, 2014
Noob uses a mobile anti-aircraft (AA) vehicle to shoot down aircraft and believes he has found his calling. He spots an enemy running towards him on foot and misses the subsequent counter-fire. The enemy plants C-4 on the vehicle and blows Noob up.
49	9	"Commander Online"	2:57	July 6, 2014
The squad receive orders from Noob, who is influencing the game through the Battlefield companion app as a commander. He sends a care package to the rest of the group, which lands on Medic and kills him. The squad refuse to follow his orders, as Medic respawns and is killed by another care package before ragequitting. The enemy commander logs into the companion app and disables Noob's controls, before somehow being taken out by Colonel 100.
50	10	"Stuck LAV"	3:24	July 13, 2014
While driving a light-armored vehicle (LAV), Noob gets stuck on a barricade and refuses to leave in case it is stolen. The squad attempt multiple methods to free him, including rocket launchers, defibrillators, and C-4. The elderly soldier frees Noob with a jeep, before Noob drives straight into another barricade.
51	11	"M2 Slam"	3:15	July 20, 2014
Engineer asks the team if they have seen any SLAMS he can use, as the squad becomes concerned over his addiction for overpowered weapons, comparing him to a crackhead.
52	12	"Musical Tanks"	3:03	July 27, 2014
Engineer discovers an enemy repair torching his tank, and as he jumps out to kill them, the enemy steals his tank. Engineer responds by repair torching it back, and the pair cycle back and forth between jumping in and out of the tank. Meanwhile, Medic attempts to teach Noob how to give out med packs. Engineer jumps out of the tank one last time before getting killed by the turret.
53	13	"Hardcore"	2:45	August 3, 2014
The squad join the hardcore gamemode and are immediately teamkilled by Noob with C-4. Noob and Simon continue to blow up their teammates while struggling with the hardcore rules. Colonel 100 snipes enemies from a different map and unlocks a bipod for his bipod before teamkilling Noob.

==== Season 5 (2015) ====
After the closure of Machinima, all Battlefield Friends episodes were set to private and eventually reuploaded to Neebs Gaming in 2021. Upon reupload, the episodes based on Battlefield 4 were rebranded as episodes 1–7 by the creators, despite originally airing alongside the Hardline arc.

No. overall	No. in season	Title	Episode length	Original release date
Based on Battlefield 4
54	1	"OK to Spawn?"	1:52	October 10, 2015
After getting spawnkilled at one of the objectives, Engineer spawns on Noob, who is in the middle of driving a motorcycle into the ocean, killing Engineer. After spawning on Recon instead, Engineer is shot by an enemy. He then attempts to spawn on a beacon and is killed by campers, and subsequently teabagged by Noob.
55	2	"Rail Gun"	2:51	August 29, 2015
Engineer gets his hands on another overpowered weapon, a handheld Rail Gun. Laughing maniacally, he is spotted by Recon who becomes concerned with his constant addictive behavior. Meanwhile, Noob is trapped inside of a hangar. Medic shows up, also holding a rail gun, and defends himself using it, before the pair shoot down a helicopter. Recon asks to use it to prove it's not overpowered, and Medic barks at him; imitating Engineer's aggressiveness when holding overpowered items. Noob finds the exit but is burned alive before he can reach it.
56	3	"Icicle Knife"	3:01	September 26, 2015
Noob and Simon hunt for icicles so they can use them as melee weapons. Recon argues over how much time they are wasting doing so, while Medic screams on the microphone for some tactical support. Once the pair finally get an icicle, the game ends.
57	4	"Live Streaming"	2:39	August 15, 2015
Noob begins livestreaming his gameplay on Twitch, talking openly out loud to his viewers. The squad enquire about what he's doing, and are intrigued by the idea of people donating money to Noob. He is stream-sniped by viewers who dance around him, while Engineer freaks out over the absurdity of the concept.
58	5	"Squad Leader"	2:43	November 7, 2015
While Noob is spotting enemies from a distance to grind XP, the squad appears informing him that he has the role of Squad Leader, and has spent the past few minutes telling his team to attack random points. They yell at Noob for spamming command orders and a chaotic discussion ensues. The group switch squads, only for their leader to be Simon instead.
59	6	"Grenade Resupply"	2:09	October 24, 2015
Ammo Guy tries to resupply his grenades, only to complain about how long the process takes. The squad attempt to move on, but he convinces them to wait for him. Colonel 100 shows up and takes a motorcycle from the resupply point and drives away, as Ammo Guy still waits for his grenades to restock. Noob shows up and tells the squad they are doing it wrong and need to use a "resupply barrel" instead, before shooting an explosive barrel and dying.
60	7	"One Good Match"	3:00	September 12, 2015
After losing eight matches straight, the team prepare to head offline and go to bed. Engineer convinces the rest to keep playing for one good match. The team load into the next game, working together to climb the scoreboard and start pulling off a successful match. They are disconnected due to server issues.
Based on Battlefield Hardline
61	8	"Hotwire"	2:43	August 8, 2015
The team discuss the strange world of Battlefield Hardline, as their commanding officer explains the rules of the Hotwire gamemode. Medic and Engineer point out the inconsistencies with them stealing cars and blowing them up despite being police officers.
62	9	"Satellite Phone"	2:37	August 22, 2015
Noob checks up on Recon after hearing he doesn't have a spawn beacon in Hardline, unlike previous titles. He encourages Engineer to apologize for "stealing" the spawn beacon after the developers moved it to his class instead of Recon. Engineer gets into an argument with Recon over the reasons why it serves him better, while Noob encourages it from the side.
63	10	"Blood Money"	1:41	September 5, 2015
While the squad are looting cash, Noob only steals a handful before leaving. The group follow him, begging him to steal more money, before accidentally running over an enemy with their car. Noob teabags the enemy and blocks the squad's car, as they decide to drag him across the map using their trunk. They reach the vault, and Noob immediately dies to a tripwire.
64	11	"Hardline RPGs"	2:33	September 19, 2015
Due to the overpowered nature of the rocket launcher, Engineer considers himself a god. He quickly realizes that everyone else in the game has picked up the rocket launcher and wants to be the only one who can use it. It is revealed that a squad on the enemy team is having the exact same argument. All three of them aim at an incoming vehicle, and watch as someone drives past on a couch.
65	12	"Team Death Spawn"	3:03	October 3, 2015
Medic spawns on an enemy and kills them, before the enemy spawns on him and wipes him out. This loop continues until Engineer tells them to stand against a wall to prevent being killed from behind. Noob and Simon are on a roof spam-throwing grenades before a teammate throws a molotov cocktail at them. Medic and Engineer grow tired of standing against the wall, and the second they leave they are spawnkilled. The enemies are blown up by Noob and Simon.
66	13	"Boosting"	3:03	October 17, 2015
Recon joins his friends, discovering that Noob is asleep while driving. He shoots at an enemy to the dismay of his teammates, quickly learning they are boosting in a custom server to level up quickly. Noob drives off the map due to being asleep.
67	14	"Heist"	3:00	October 31, 2015
The squad attempt to break into a bank vault during a heist, when Noob teamkills them by entering the room with explosives. They continue the heist before Noob splits off again, getting lost in the wrong building. They encourage him to use a zipline to get across the gap, and Noob fires it directly at an enemy, getting a kill. They successfully complete the heist and win the game.
68	15	"BF4 or Hardline"	3:20	November 14, 2015
Recon calls Medic, asking him to play Battlefield Hardline with them. Medic is playing Battlefield 4 on his own and doesn't want to play Hardline, as they debate the pros and cons of each game. The episode is a meta-joke symbolizing the creators discussing which direction to take the series. Colonel 100 reveals he is playing both games at the same time.

==== Season 6 (2016) ====
No. overall	No. in season	Title	Episode length	Original release date
69	1	"Waiting on a New Game"	3:35	October 1, 2016
While playing Battlefield 4 on his own, Engineer needs some friends to join. He calls Noob, who is in the middle of playing a parody of Star Wars Battlefront II before being killed by the "legal team". Engineer then calls Recon, who is playing Battlefield Hardline. He then calls Medic, who is in the middle of playing a dress-up game, as Engineer suspects he might be playing Call of Duty, which he denies. After a motivational speech, Engineer encourages the group of play Battlefield 4, as they join one by one. Medic joins wearing a pink skirt, to which Engineer yells that he "knew he was playing Call of Duty".
70	2	"Operation Crowded"	3:11	October 8, 2016
As the team load into a game on the Operation Locker map, they all begin charging at the same time, causing Recon to glitch out. Recon asks Noob for some space, causing an argument in which Noob leaves the area. Eventually, the squad call Noob to ask for his help, and tell him to meet them at the objective. When he arrives, Noob passive aggressively asks them if he's giving the group enough space, only for them to flee bullets while he blocks the door, getting them killed.
71	3	"Rainbow Sixer"	3:02	October 15, 2016
While planning ways to breach an objective, a new player joins the squad. The player rappels down, grabbing the attention of Recon and Engineer. He tells them that he is a Tom Clancy's Rainbow Six Siege player, smugly labelling all of the features available in Siege that aren't in Battlefield. Engineer says it doesn't matter because they're not the same game, comparing it to invincibility stars only being available in Super Mario. Colonel 100 shows up and eats an invincibility star, breaching the objective himself.
72	4	"Phantom Bow"	2:25	October 22, 2016
While enjoying the power of the Phantom Bow, Recon and Engineer encounter Ammo Guy, who tells them they didn't earn it and only got it from a crate on the map instead of an elaborate easter egg. Colonel 100 appears, and says it reminds him of what the developers did with the C-100 knife. Recon mentions that the knife is still only achievable by getting to level 100, to which the Colonel remarks that anyone can rank up through spotting bonuses. Recon claims he earned it with hard work, until Noob drives past and spots an enemy, getting promoted to Colonel 100. Recon throws away his knife.
73	5	"Dice Camo"	3:28	October 29, 2016
Noob and Simon attempt to complete the easter egg which grants an exclusive camo cosmetic. Engineer begins an argument with Noob for not paying attention to the game and causing them to die. Noob calls easter eggs the "best part" of Battlefield and references a secret that appeared in Hardline in the bathroom stalls. Noob refuses to help Engineer with the objective, while Simon drives away in a tank to continue the steps. A helicopter approaches Noob and Engineer. Simon drives directly into a lake, which launches the tank into the sky, blowing up the helicopter as he lands exactly where he started.
74	6	"Turrets"	2:54	November 5, 2016
Engineer attempts to use a mounted gun turret, and becomes frustrated with the aiming radius. Noob confuses the word turret with tourettes syndrome, and begins to tell a story about his neighbor. When he finally gets a slot lined up, Engineer misses the enemy and complains about its shakiness. Simon gets on a turret but accidentally fires a rocket at Recon and Noob, causing their building to collapse.
75	7	"Missile Truck"	3:08	November 12, 2016
Noob gets a surface-to-air missile truck and fires rockets, not realizing he is inside a base and they are hitting the ceiling. Medic points out this fact, and they argue over Noob ignoring his advice. Noob looks at the ceiling to see where the missiles aim, before Simon steals the truck and drives away. The truck is instantly destroyed by a tank.
76	8	"Hiddenfield"	2:59	November 19, 2016
Noob and Simon hide inside of an objective to defend it without fighting. When the enemy captures it and leaves, Noob sticks his leg out to take it back.
77	9	"Rooftop Enemy"	2:40	November 26, 2016
Engineer attempts to fight an enemy who is camping on the rooftop. After dying multiple times, he keeps spawning to try and best him, only to die through sniper bullets, C-4 explosives, and more. His squadmates attempt to talk him out of it, but Engineer remains convicted. He throws a grenade onto the rooftop, and climbs up, only for the enemy to be gone. Engineer is immediately sniped from the other rooftop.
78	10	"S.U.A.V"	2:53	December 3, 2016
The group are pinned down by an enemy squad, as Recon suggests using an SUAV to take them out. Noob takes control of the drone, and spots an squad. He flies it directly into his own face and dies.
79	11	"Under Water"	2:37	December 10, 2016
Noob asks for help from his squadmates, revealing he is trapped underwater. The team pretend they are coming to his rescue before activating the flood system and drowning him.
80	12	"Stolen Tank"	3:12	December 17, 2016
Enemies keep stealing the squad's tanks, preventing them from spawning more. When the group have only one tank left, they decide to defend it with their lives. They quickly realize Noob is driving it. Noob bails out, thinking it's going to explode. Instead, an enemy steals it and runs him over.
81	13	"Finding a Server"	3:16	December 24, 2016
The group of friends attempt to find a server to join, constantly loading into one with issues or rules they disagree with. When they finally find a perfect server, it switches to Operation Metro causing them to keep searching forever.
82	14	"Chat Fight"	3:08	December 31, 2016
An enemy player sends a message in text chat, starting an argument with Engineer. Noob discovers text chat for the first time and shares jokes with Simon.
83	15	"BF1 Hype Train"	2:48	January 7, 2017
Medic waits on the platform for the Battlefield 1 hype train, preparing to board with a pre-order ticket. Recon and Engineer attempt to convince him to hold off on pre-ordering due to previously messy Battlefield launches. Noob and Simon show up dressed in American Civil War attire, confusing it with the upcoming game's World War One setting. Recon also boards the hype train, with the group leaving Engineer behind.

=== Battlefield 2042 ===
==== Season 7 (2022) ====
No. overall	No. in season	Title	Episode length	Original release date
84	1	"Worst Launch Ever"	4:37	February 14, 2022
During launch week of Battlefield 2042, the squad rides up the side of a building in a hovercraft. Recon notices that Engineer is using an overpowered weapon, which is quickly taken by a DICE employee who fixes it. The pair give a list of problems with the game to the developer, who is overworked, tired and recently divorced. Noob accidentally joins a solo lobby and plays against AI enemies.
85	2	"We're Leaving"	4:24	March 1, 2022
Recon and Ammo Guy wait at a bus stop to leave Battlefield 2042 due to the state of the game. Engineer tries to convince them to stay. Noob searches for items to blow up, disappointed with the lack of destruction in the game. Medic shows up in the form of an elderly lady, reflecting the character model in the game, while the group makes fun of him. The group points out the amount of AI enemies in the match due to the lack of players. Medic calls in a vehicle, only for a pink mobility scooter to appear.
86	3	"Not Woke"	4:25	March 22, 2022
When Engineer and Medic are saved by the elderly soldier, they notice he is now black and praising the diversity of 2042. When Engineer complains about the character models, the soldier accuses him of being "unwoke". Engineer claims he is simply talking about the game's specialists, and says the old man would be more likely to be racist than him, to which the soldier takes offense at being called a man. He pulls out a chalkboard explaining gender identity to the pair, before flipping it over and claiming all ginger people have no soul and are going straight to hell.
87	4	"Playing Other Games"	3:30	June 3, 2022
Six months after the launch of Battlefield 2042, Recon appears in the lobby dressed as a wizard after playing Elden Ring. He visits Patch Guy, the employee from earlier in the season, asking him when new updates are coming. Patch Guy responds pointing out the scoreboard that was recently added, to which Recon expresses disappointment. The episode ends with Noob and Engineer being crushed by a shipping container when Patch Guy adds more cover to the map.
88	5	"Dumb Specialist Dialogue"	4:01	July 2, 2022
While recording voice lines for the game's specialists, Noob is directed to act more like a grown man. Engineer reads the script, pointing out how the dialogue is terrible. Simon is told to do an Asian accent, while Engineer is instructed to speak with a Russian accent.
89	6	"Is It Good Now?"	3:31	August 19, 2022
During the Season 1 update of Battlefield 2042, the squad log in to see what's new. They enjoy the new map, ziplines, and weapons while the old soldier appears with ginger hair. Note: This episode marks the final appearance of Tony Schnur, who died in 2023.
