= Battlefield Friends =

American animated web series

- Also known as: BFFs
- Genre: Animated comedy
- Created by: Brent Triplett; Jon Etheridge; Bryan Mahoney; Tony Schnur; Nate Panning
- Based on: Battlefield by Electronic Arts
- Voices of: Brent Triplett; Jon Etheridge; Tony Schnur; Nate Panning
- Theme music composer: Tony Schnur
- Composer: Alex Beard
- Country of origin: United States
- Original language: English
- No. of seasons: 7
- No. of episodes: 89 (list of episodes)

Production
- Animators: Brent Triplett; Jon Etheridge; Sheila Brothers
- Running time: 2–4 minutes
- Production companies: Hank & Jed Movie Pictures

Original release
- Network: Machinima
- Release: January 27, 2012 – January 7, 2017
- Network: YouTube
- Release: February 14 – August 19, 2022

Related
- Battleloggers

Battlefield Friends, often called BFFs, is an American animated comedy web series created by Hank & Jed Movie Pictures and originally distributed by Machinima. The show is based on the video game series Battlefield by Electronic Arts. With an ensemble voice cast starring Brent Triplett, Jon Etheridge, Tony Schnur and Nate Panning, the show focuses on a group of four friends — Noob, Engineer, Recon and Medic — as they navigate the struggles of playing Battlefield titles together.

The series debuted through the Machinima network in 2012, intended by the creators Triplett, Panning, Schnur, Etheridge and Bryan Mahoney to serve as a skit-based parody of Battlefield 3. The first season was released to immediate acclaim among players and the military community, and was nominated for Best Animated Series at the 2013 IAWTV Awards. Later seasons were moved to Machinima Happy Hour before the show returned to the main network in 2015. After Machinima's shutdown, the show was renewed for an independent seventh season in 2022, uploaded directly to the Neebs Gaming channel.

== Production ==
Hank & Jed Movie Pictures was founded by Brent Triplett, Bryan Mahoney, and Nate Panning in 2006 to create live action and animated media, with Etheridge and Schnur joining later as voice actors and animators. By 2012, the crew had been playing Battlefield: Bad Company and Battlefield 3 for some time and found themselves "constantly talking" about their experiences, deciding to create an animated pilot for a parody series.

In January 2012, Machinima picked up the show, and released the pilot episode of Battlefield Friends, titled "First Flight". The episode, an animated sketch depicting a group of players being flown around by a noob, was conceived by Triplett based on his own experiences of trying to learn to fly a helicopter in a server full of experienced players. Shortly after the release of the first season, the show was nominated for Best Animated Series at the 2013 IAWTV Awards, ultimately losing out to Rooster Teeth's Red vs. Blue.

The show is written, produced and animated by all four members of the main cast alongside Bryan Mahoney, who also provides his voice to supporting roles. Episodes are composed by Alex Beard with additional animation from Sheila Brothers. A majority of the episodes are directed by Triplett, and ideas are conceived by the crew by playing Battlefield matches together and writing stories about what happen to them. Each episode takes about a week to create, which allows episodes to cover topical Battlefield updates and inside jokes.

In 2013, the show was renewed for a second and third season and was moved to the animation-focused network Machinima Happy Hour, remaining there until the conclusion of the fourth season in 2014. From season four onwards, the show was based on the newly-released Battlefield 4, but would pivot to Battlefield Hardline for the fifth season, before returning to Battlefield 4 after Hardline's negative reception.

=== Formation of Neebs Gaming ===
In 2014, the team at Hank & Jed Movie Pictures quit their day jobs and signed with Creative Artists Agency (CCA) to form Neebs Gaming, a YouTube channel focused entirely on playing video games while performing improvisational comedy and leaning into their personalities from the Battlefield Friends show. In 2020, the Neebs Gaming channel and the Hank & Jed channel were hacked when one of the company's editors fell for a phishing scam which promoted a fake sponsorship attempt, ultimately leading the channels to be compromised. Both of the accounts had usernames changed to "Coinbase Pro", all videos set to private and were used to livestream a Bitcoin scam video. The accounts were restored within 24 hours by Google.

=== Machinima shutdown ===
On January 18, 2019, Machinima was reorganized by its parent company AT&T and all of the network's content, including every Battlefield Friends episode, was set to private. On February 1, Machinima laid off all of its employees and closed its doors, leaving the show's future uncertain.

On February 14, 2022, Hank & Jed Movie Pictures premiered the seventh season of Battlefield Friends independently on the Neebs Gaming channel, consisting of only six episodes. The season is a parody of Battlefield 2042, which was commercially and critically panned upon release, and focuses on the controversies surrounding the game's launch.

=== Death of Tony Schnur ===
On February 14, 2023, the cast and crew of Battlefield Friends announced that Tony Schnur had died from cancer at 47 years old. The same day, the Battlefield social media account paid tribute to Schnur, naming him "one of the most incredible people in the Battlefield community" and referencing his role on the show by stating "thank you for your service, Recon".

In April, DICE added a player card cosmetic item to Battlefield 2042 called "Fly High, Recon", which depicted three soldiers pointing at a MAV (the gadget for the recon class). The item's description paid additional tribute to Schnur's legacy, stating that "Recon, a member of Task Force BFF, has completed his final tour and hung up his gear. This squad has been together since 2012. They had a unique ability to always get the job done, whether or not they understood what they were doing. His brothers, Engineer, Medic - and yes, even the Noob - shall carry his legacy forward".

== Cast ==
=== Main ===
- Brent Triplett as Noob / Old Man
- Jon Etheridge as Engineer / Closet Colonel
- Tony Schnur (Note: Schnur died in 2023 after the conclusion of the seventh season.) as Recon / PC Elitist
- Nate Panning as Medic

=== Recurring ===
- Bryan Mahoney as Simon Belmont / Ammo Guy / Colonel 100

=== Guest ===
- Tracey Coppedge as Girl Gamer
- JackFrags as Himself
- LevelCap as Himself
- Doom49 as Himself
- ChaBoyyHD as Himself
- XFactorGaming as Himself
- AnderZEL as Himself
- FrankieOnPCin1080p as Himself

== Episodes ==
| Season | Episodes | Originally released | | Based on |
| Season | Episodes | First released | Last released | Based on |
|---|---|---|---|---|
| 1 | 13 | January 27, 2012 | June 10, 2012 | Battlefield 3 |
| 2 | 13 | December 16, 2012 | March 10, 2013 | Battlefield 3 |
| 3 | 14 | August 9, 2013 | October 27, 2013 | Battlefield 3 |
| 4 | 13 | May 11, 2014 | August 3, 2014 | Battlefield 4 |
| 5 | 15 | August 8, 2015 | November 14, 2015 | Battlefield 4 / Battlefield Hardline |
| 6 | 15 | October 1, 2016 | January 7, 2017 | Battlefield 4 |
| 7 | 6 | January 14, 2022 | August 19, 2022 | Battlefield 2042 |

== Legacy ==
=== In popular culture ===
Battlefield 4

On December 17, 2013, Electronic Arts released the multiplayer trailer for Battlefield 4. Around the one-minute mark, a character drives an ATV off of a skyscraper, screaming "Levolution!" before crashing into a helicopter. The character was voiced by Brent Triplett, referencing the Noob's excitement over the feature in the season three finale of Battlefield Friends. In the same episode, Noob also makes off-handed references to a supposed Megalodon hiding in the game, which the other characters write off as a conspiracy theory. It would later emerge that Battlefield 4 did have a Megalodon easter egg, with Eurogamer suggesting that the show's creators knew about the shark prior to its reveal.

After the release of Battlefield 4, players noticed that Tony Schnur, Nate Panning, and Jon Etheridge also provided performances for the game's playable characters in multiplayer. During the singleplayer campaign mission "Tashgar", players can also discover three sets of soldiers voiced by the Battlefield Friends cast members. It later emerged that the cast were invited to appear in the game after developers at DICE became fans of the series.

Battlefield Hardline

In September 2015, fans discovered a bathroom stall in Battlefield Hardline that, when hit, would play voice lines from Triplett in character as the Noob, screaming at the player for being impatient. This easter egg would later be alluded to by the cast in the sixth season's fifth episode "Dice Camo".

Battlefield 1

In October 2017, players located an easter egg in Battlefield 1 that would appear when crouched beneath a tank on the Volga River, allowing fans to hear an argument between the cast of Battlefield Friends.
