= Hovertank =

Hovertank may refer to:

- A type of military hovercraft
  - Hovercraft tank, a Soviet amphibious tank
- Hovertank One, a 1991 video game

== See also ==
- Winged tank, an airborne tank
