= Selectable Lightweight Attack Munition =

Multi-purpose US landmine

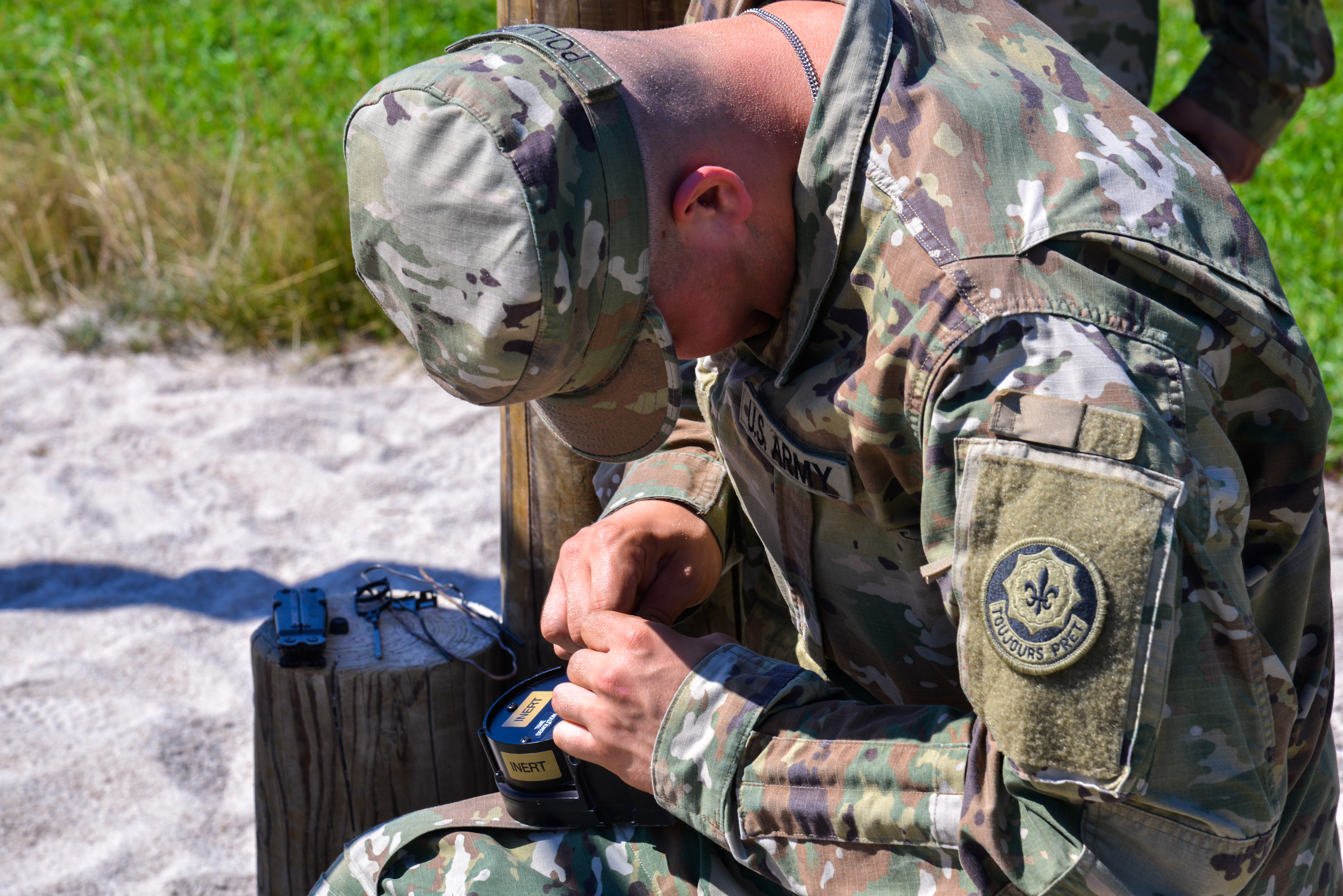
Selectable Lightweight Attack Munition during training

Selectable Lightweight Attack Munition or (M2/M3/M4 SLAM) is a small United States multi-purpose landmine produced by ATK Precision Fuze Company in Janesville, Wisconsin from 1992 to 2002. It has a passive infrared sensor, and a magnetic influence sensor which allow it to be used as a demolition munition, off-route mine, or full-width belly attack mine.

== Overview ==
The SLAM is compact and weighs only 1 kilogram, so it is easily man-portable. The SLAM is intended for use against APCs, parked aircraft, wheeled or tracked vehicles, stationary targets (such as electrical transformers), small fuel-storage tanks (less than 38,000 litres (10,000 US gal)), and ammunition storage facilities. When the mine is triggered, the Misnay-Schardin effect generates a copper explosively formed penetrator (EFP), which can penetrate 40 millimeters of armor at a range of eight meters.

The SLAM has an anti-tamper feature that is only active in the bottom- and side-attack modes. The SLAM will detonate when an attempt is made to change the selector switch's position after arming.

The SLAM is produced in three versions:

- M2 - Solid green, with no labels, which silently self-neutralizes at the end of its active period (either 4, 10 or 24 hours)
- M3 - Can only be used in the command detonated mode.
- M4 - Green with a black painted warhead face, which self-destructs at the end of its active period (either 4, 10 or 24 hours)

The M4 is normally used by units designated as light, airborne, air assault, crisis response, and rapid deployment.

== Modes of operation ==
The SLAM has four possible modes of detonation—bottom attack, side attack, timed demolition, and command detonation.

=== Bottom attack ===
The SLAM has a built-in magnetic influence sensor, that allows it to be used as a full-width belly attack munition against vehicles. It can be concealed along trails and roads where target vehicles operate and can be camouflaged with dry leaves, grass, and so forth without affecting EFP performance. Mud, gravel, water, and other debris that fill the EFP cup have minimal impact on EFP formation and effectiveness as long as the debris does not extend beyond the depth of the EFP cup. The magnetic sensor is designed to trigger detonation when it senses a vehicle passing overhead. For the EFP to form properly, it needs a minimum of 13 centimeters (5 in) from the point of emplacement to the target. The bottom-attack mode is active when the selector switch is set to 4, 10, or 24 hours and the passive infrared sensor (PIRS) trigger cover is in place.

=== Side attack ===
The SLAM is equipped with a passive infrared sensor (PIRS) that was specifically developed for the side-attack mode. The PIRS detects trucks and light armored vehicles by sensing the change in background temperature when a vehicle crosses in front of the PIRS port. The PIRS is directional and aligned with the EFP when the device is aimed. The side-attack mode is active when the SLAM selector switch is set to 4, 10, or 24 hours—and the PIRS cover is removed to expose the PIRS.

=== Timed demolition ===
The SLAM's built-in timer will trigger detonation at the end of a selected time. The timed-demolition mode is active when the SLAM selector switch is set to 15, 30, 45, or 60 minutes. In this mode, the magnetic sensor and the PIRS are inoperable, and the SLAM will detonate after the selected time has expired.

=== Command detonation ===
This mode provides manual warhead initiation using standard military blasting caps and a priming adapter. The command-detonation capability bypasses the SLAM's fuse and safing and arming (S&A) assembly.

== Specifications ==
- Length: 127 mm (5.2 in)
- Width: 89 mm (3.5 in)
- Depth: 55 mm (2.2 in)
- Explosive content: 0.28 kg (0.6 lb) of LX-14
- Weight: 1 kg (2.2 lb)

== Appearances in media ==
The SLAM can be found in Half-Life 2: Deathmatch. It was omitted from Half-Life 2, but was later added back into Deathmatch. This weapon has made an appearance in Garry's Mod, a sandbox modification for Half-Life 2. Also appeared in a Half life fan games like Entropy : Zero 2 The SLAM can also be used in Battlefield 4 and Battlefield 6. A fictional future variant of the SLAM (called the M6) is depicted in Arma 3.
