= Hovercraft tank =

Amphibious hovering tank
- Type: hovercraft tank, project
- Place of origin: Soviet Union

Production history
- Designer: Moscow Aircraft Plant #84
- Designed: 1937
- No. built: Never built

Specifications
- Length: 10 m
- Crew: 2
- Armor: Hull and turret front 13 mm, Hull and turret side 10 mm
- Main armament: 1 × 7.62 mm (.30 in) DT machine gun
- Engine: 2 × M-25 aircraft engine 1450 hp (summary)
- Suspension: air cushion
- Maximum speed: up to 120 km/h

Hovercraft tank, or, officially, the amphibious hovering tank (Russian: Земноводный подлетающий танк) was developed at Moscow aircraft plant #84 in the USSR in 1937 by a group of engineers led by professor Vladimir Israilevich Levkov. Its development never left the mockup stage.

== History ==
The first successful experiments with hovercraft in the USSR date back to the mid-1930s and are tightly connected with the name of talented engineer and designer Vladimir Levkov, who substantiated the possibility of hovercraft as far back as in his 1925 treatise The vortex theory of the rotor (Russian: Вихревая теория ротора). In 1934, the L-1 hovercraft boat, which is sometimes referred to as the first hovercraft boat in the world, was designed and built in his laboratory, with the L-5 fast-attack boat soon to follow. It became obvious that there was great potential in further development of this transportation technology.

Along with civilian vehicles, Levkov also made attempts to employ the technology for military use. In 1937 a group of Moscow aircraft plant #84 engineers under his lead initiated the development of a hovercraft tank, or, as it was named in the original documentation, the amphibious hovering tank. It was loosely based on the L-1 hovercraft boat design, as well as related to the L-5 boat which was also in development stage at the time. The developers stated that such armored vehicle could be efficiently used in swampy and sand areas, as well as areas with plentiful lakes and rivers. In the end of 1937 a 1:4 scale mockup was built. However, it may be theorized that the project did not get the attention of high-ranking members of the military and therefore was never completed.

== Design ==
The vehicle's streamlined hull had U-shaped cross-section, following the L-1 boat's layout, and was to be welded from 10–13 mm steel armor plates, with sloping bow and stern.

Two M-25 aircraft engines, producing 1450 hp altogether, propelled two airscrews, which were mounted inside vertical tunnels at bow and stern parts of the hull. The design documentation stipulated that the vehicle, weighing 8.5 ton, would hover at 200–250 mm above water or ground surface and travel at 120 km/h. Cornering was achieved by means of louvers, which regulated the flow of air.

The tank was designed for a two-person crew: the driver who sat behind the forward propeller and the commander/gunner who operated the cylindrical rotating turret. The vehicle's armament consisted of one 7,62 mm (.30 Cal) Degtyarev tank machine gun.

== Modern evaluation ==
While it is extremely difficult to estimate the possible combat effectiveness of such an exotic concept as a hovering tank, it is obvious that speed and amphibious capabilities would be its major advantages, while technical reliability, as well as general plausibility of such a vehicle, are in question, considering the 1930s level of technology and the novelty of hovercraft vehicles back then altogether. Additionally, thin armor and presumably large size would make it an easy target for anti-tank artillery, or even large calibre machine guns and autocannons.

The reasons for which the development of this project was ceased are unknown.

Later, Pavel Grohovsky, an aircraft designer and inventor, worked at the Red Army Air Force OKB on a hovering armoured car with auxiliary wheels, which also was never completed.

In 1962 a hovertank prototype was built by VNIITransMash.

== In popular culture ==
The Final Stand DLC for the video game Battlefield 4 contains a science-fictional hovertank called the "HT-95 Levkov". This name may be a reference to Vladimir Israilevich Levkov, the lead designer of the hovercraft tank.

== Sources ==
- Солянкин, А. Г.; Павлов, М. В.; Павлов, И. В.; Желтов, И. Г. (2002). Отечественные бронированные машины. XX век (in Russian). Vol. 1. М.: Экспринт. p. 112. ISBN 5-94038-030-1.
- Желтов, Игорь (2004). Летающий танк профессора Левкова. Техника — молодёжи (in Russian) (2–2004): 58–59. ISSN 0320-331X.
