= Battlefield Hardline =

2015 video game

- Developer: Visceral Games (Note: Additional work by DICE)
- Publisher: Electronic Arts
- Director: Ian Milham
- Producers: Julian Beak; Mike Glosecki; Cate Latchford; Scott Probst; David Woldman
- Designers: Thad Sasser; Scott Warner; Ben Walker
- Programmers: Simon Everett; Steve Timson
- Writers: Rob Auten; Tom Bissell
- Composer: Paul Leonard-Morgan
- Series: Battlefield
- Engine: Frostbite 3
- Platforms: PlayStation 3; PlayStation 4; Windows; Xbox 360; Xbox One
- Release: NA: March 17, 2015; PAL: March 19, 2015; UK: March 20, 2015
- Genre: First-person shooter
- Modes: Single-player, multiplayer

Battlefield Hardline is a 2015 first-person shooter game developed by Visceral Games and published by Electronic Arts. It was released in March 2015 for PlayStation 3, PlayStation 4, Windows, Xbox 360, and Xbox One. It is the fourteenth installment in the Battlefield series. Hardline focuses on crime, heist and policing elements instead of warfare. Upon release, the game received a mixed critical reception, with critics praising the game's multiplayer mode, accessibility and voice acting, while criticizing the narrative and stealth gameplay. It was the final Battlefield game to be released for the PlayStation 3 and Xbox 360 platforms and also the last game to be developed by Visceral Games before the company shut down in 2017.

== Gameplay ==
The focus of the game is the "war on crime", breaking away from the military setting that characterized the series. As such, the main factions in Hardline are the police Special Response Units and criminals. Players have access to various military-grade weapons and vehicles, such as the Lenco BearCat, as well as having police equipment such as tasers and handcuffs.

Hardline also uses the "Levolution" mechanic from Battlefield 4. For example, in the map "Downtown" players can send a construction crane crashing into the building, ripping down debris from the central buildings in downtown, which falls down on the streets of Los Angeles. This time, every map features multiple Levolution events, both small and large.

Many new game modes are featured in Hardline, including "Heist", "Rescue", "Hotwire", "Blood Money", and "Crosshair" Mode.

- Heist: The criminals must break into a cash-filled vault (or, as featured in some maps, blow open the doors of an armored truck) then move the cash filled packages to an extraction point; the police must stop them. If the Criminals manage to escape by bringing all the money to the extraction point, they win.
- Blood Money: Both factions must retrieve money from an open crate in the center of the map, then move it back to their respective side's armored truck. Players can also steal money from the opposing team's truck. The team that first deposits $5 million worth of money into their truck or the team with the most money under a time limit wins.
- Hotwire: Drivable cars take the role of traditional Conquest "flags". Like Conquest, capturing cars (done by driving above a certain "cruising" speed) will bleed the enemy team's reinforcement tickets. The team who reduces the other's to zero or who has the most tickets remaining after the time limit wins.
- Rescue: In a three-minute-long 5 vs. 5 competitive mode, S.W.A.T. officers must try to rescue hostages held by criminal forces. The cops win by either rescuing the hostage(s) or by killing all the criminals. Criminals win by killing all the cops, or defending the hostages until the negotiations are over. Each player has only one life in this mode, which means no respawns.
- Crosshair: The second competitive game mode in Battlefield Hardline. Crosshair is also three minutes long, 5 vs. 5 with only one life. The criminals are trying to kill a player-controlled VIP on the cops' side who is a former gang member turned state's witness. The criminals win by killing the VIP and the cops win by getting the VIP to the extraction point.

Visceral Games ratified that the single-player campaign will not be linear and promised to deliver a better one than the predecessors. The campaign features episodic crime dramas where choices will change situational outcomes and gameplay experiences. As a cop, players can use multiple police gadgets and personal equipment. The police badge can be used to order criminals to lay down their weapons, the scanner is used to stake out a situation, identify high-value targets, log evidences, tag alarms, and mark other threats. To slip past unnoticed, players can use bullet cases to distract enemies.

== Synopsis ==
=== Setting ===
Miami is embroiled in a drug war and Officer Nicholas "Nick" Mendoza (voiced by Philip Anthony-Rodriguez, motion captured by Nicholas Gonzalez) has just been made detective. Alongside his partner, veteran detective Khai Minh Dao (Kelly Hu), he follows the Miami drug supply chain from the streets to the source. In a series of increasingly off-the-books cases, the two detectives come to realize that power and corruption can affect both sides of the law.

=== Plot ===
In 2012, Miami Police Detectives Nick Mendoza and Carl Stoddard (Travis Willingham) make a drug bust that goes violent. After arresting a fleeing suspect, Captain Julian Dawes (Benito Martinez) has Nick partner up with Detective Khai Minh Dao to follow a lead to cocaine broker Tyson Latchford (Adam J. Harrington). Catching Tyson's associate Tap (David DeSantos) and forcing him to wear a wire, they find a new drug called Hot Shot being sold in the streets of Miami and rescue Tyson from a group of armed men. In the process Khai is severely wounded, putting her out of action for several weeks. After returning (against her doctor's orders), Dawes orders the two to bring in police informant Leo Ray (Graham Shiels) from the Elmore Hotel but are forced to fight their way through armed men connected to drug dealer Remy Neltz (T.J. Storm), who is distributing the Hot Shot drug. While capturing Leo, Khai beats him up for seemingly insulting her.

Leo's information leads the two detectives to the Everglades, where drug bales are being dropped. Investigating the area, they discover several of Neltz's drug operations and Leo's mutilated corpse, who was presumably killed for cooperating with the Miami Police. They eventually find Neltz only for him to escape back to Miami. Before leaving, he mentions that he took a deal from Stoddard. The officers corner him in a Miami warehouse only for Stoddard to kill Neltz as he was about to elaborate more on their deal. Nick leaves in disgust after Stoddard and Khai take some cash before more officers arrive. Later, as a hurricane makes landfall, Dawes sends Nick and Khai back to the crime scene for any evidence incriminating Stoddard. Finding Neltz's recording implicating Stoddard, Nick finds his former partner in a meeting with other drug dealers but is forced to work with him to rescue Khai from more armed men. The three later meet Dawes, who destroys the evidence implicating Stoddard and revealing that himself and Khai are corrupt. The three betray Nick due to his refusal to go along with their scheme, framing him for laundering Neltz's drug money.

Three years later in 2015, while on a prison bus, Nick escapes with the help of Tap and Tyson. The mastermind behind Nick's escape is none other than Khai. Despite raw feelings about her betrayal and being framed, Nick leaves with Khai and Tyson for Los Angeles. Khai briefs Nick that during the three years he has been in prison, Dawes founded private law enforcement firm Preferred Outcomes, having 'cleaned up' Miami and is starting to expand into other US cities. Wanting to ruin Dawes, Khai sends Nick and Tyson to rendezvous with Marcus "Boomer" Boone (Eugene Byrd) and the three of them disrupt Korean Mafia leader Kang's drug business (Dawes' main drug distribution spot in LA). Although not finding much, Nick and Khai follow another lead to the house of drug kingpin Neil Roark (Mark Rolston). During Roark's meeting, Nick comes up with the idea to steal Dawes' money before he can launder it and uses Khai's phone as a makeshift tracking device by placing it in a briefcase to be taken to where the rest of Dawes' money is being kept. After surviving a brief assault by Roark's men, Nick and Khai make their escape.

Dawes' money is kept in the penthouse of his corporate HQ skyscraper back in Miami and behind an impregnable vault, Boomer calls a former associate of his for a safecracking robot. He and Nick drive to the desert to meet Boomer's contact, his ex-girlfriend Dune (Alexandra Daddario), who sets up a meeting with her father, Tony Alpert (Fred Tatasciore). Alpert backstabs them, however, revealing he knows Nick is an escaped felon and that Stoddard has placed a bounty on him for his capture alive. Nick and Boomer escape their prison and retrieve their gear from Alpert's compound. Along the way, Nick discovers that Alpert was behind the creation and manufacturing of the Hot Shot drug, and murdered an ATF agent named Darius Barnes (Josh Keaton) to cover up his plans of starting a civil war. Dune helps the two escape to an abandoned airfield, but they separate after surviving Alpert's ambush at a gas station. At the airfield, Nick retrieves the safecracking robot and wins a tank duel against Alpert, before he and Boomer escape in a plane Boomer had repaired.

As Khai, Nick, Boomer, and Tyson prepare to leave for Miami they are ambushed by Stoddard and his men. Nick kills his former partner Stoddard and sends a picture of Stoddard's body to Dawes. The group arrive in Miami and infiltrate Preferred Outcomes HQ. They find the vault in Dawes' penthouse only to find it booby-trapped. Tyson is gravely wounded by the blast but survives. Nick answers Khai's ringing phone in the empty vault to hear Dawes on the other side, telling Nick to come find him at Santa Rosita off the coast of Florida. Nick departs from his group on the island to find medical attention for Tyson, and later infiltrates Dawes' mansion alone. Nick finds his former captain in his office, where Dawes tells him that he wishes Nick to join him and take over Preferred Outcomes once Dawes is gone and that the two are akin to be "more criminal than cop". Nick agrees to the last remark and unhesitantly shoots Dawes dead. Searching his office, he finds a letter addressed to him from Dawes explaining why he framed Nick three years earlier and follows a passage to his underground vault. Inside the vault, Nick finds Dawes' laundered fortune, which is now his, left to wonder how he will use it.

== Development ==
Battlefield Hardline was revealed on an EA blog post by vice president and general manager of Visceral Games, Steve Papoutsis. The game was due for announcement during E3 2014, but information was leaked early. Unlike other games in the Battlefield franchise that portray military conflicts, Hardline features a "cops and robbers" gameplay style. The leaked trailer refers to the game as Omaha. "Visceral started work on Battlefield Hardline about a year before Dead Space 3 shipped," creative director Ian Milham has revealed, suggesting that the game may have entered development in early 2012.

On June 14, 2014, the Battlefield Hardline beta went public, coming after an official announcement at E3 2014 that the beta would be coming soon to PC and PlayStation 4. The beta ended on June 26, 2014.

Later at E3 2014, EA confirmed that the game would be running at 1080p on the PlayStation 4 and was aiming to achieve the same resolution for the Xbox One version. However, on March 8, 2015, Visceral Games revealed that the PlayStation 4 version would only run at 900p, with the Xbox One version running at 720p. On February 3, 2015, the Battlefield Hardline beta became publicly active for all platforms. It was reported that 7 million people participated in the open beta and it was met with positive reception from both critics and players. On February 24, 2015, Electronic Arts confirmed that the game had been declared gold, indicating it was being prepared for production and release.

== Release ==
On July 22, 2014, EA announced that they would delay Battlefield Hardline from October 21, 2014, to March 17, 2015. The reason for the delay was to implement the feedback given during the public beta.

The Premium Edition of the game was announced on March 2, 2015. Players who purchased the Premium Edition will unlock several features, including masks, a Gun bench that allows player to customize their weapons and "Legendary Status", a feature relating to the progression system of the game. On the same day, the four expansion packs of the game, namely Criminal Activity, Robbery, Getaway, and Betrayal were announced. Similar to Battlefield 4's Premium Program, premium members of Hardline gained access to the four expansion packs two weeks before other players. Four new maps, as well as new vehicles, masks, and weapons were introduced to the game through the Criminal Activity DLC. According to the lead multiplayer producer Zach Mumbach, the pack would put more emphasis on "destructibility". A new game mode called "Bounty Hunter" is also featured. It was released in June 2015. The second expansion, Robbery, features a five-versus-five multiplayer modes called Squad Heist, new paints, weapons and "Legendary Super Feature". The expansion pack was released in September 2015. A free DLC called Blackout, was released in November 2015 featuring new maps and weapons among other features and game improvements. The third expansion, Getaway, which adds a new mode called "Capture the Bag" and new maps to the game, was released on January 12, 2016. The final expansion, Betrayal, was released in March 2016.

The game was delisted from the PlayStation 3 and Xbox 360 storefronts on July 31, 2024 and online servers were shut down on November 7, 2024 for both platforms. The game was removed from the PlayStation 4 and Xbox One storefronts on May 22, 2026, and online servers were shut down on June 22, 2026 for both platforms. Only the Windows version retains online functionality.

== Reception ==
Reception

Aggregate score
Aggregator	Score
Metacritic	(PS4) 73/100 (PC, XOne) 71/100

Review scores
Publication	Score
Destructoid	(PC) 6/10
Game Informer	(PS4) 8/10
GameRevolution	(PS4) 8/10
GameSpot	(XOne) 7/10
GameTrailers	(PS4) 8/10
Giant Bomb	3/5
IGN	8/10
PlayStation Official Magazine – UK	(PS4) 8/10
Official Xbox Magazine (UK)	(XOne) 7/10
PC Gamer (UK)	(PC) 76%
PCGamesN	(PC) 7/10
Polygon	(XOne) 7/10
Shacknews	(XOne) 6/10
USgamer	(PS4) 3.5/5
National Post	(PC) 7/10
Slant Magazine	(PS4) 3.5/5

=== Critical response ===
The PC, PlayStation 4 and Xbox One versions received "mixed or average" reviews according to the review aggregation website Metacritic. In Japan, where the game was ported for release on March 19, 2015 (the same release date as the PAL version), Famitsu gave the console versions each a score of two nines and two eights for a total of 34 out of 40.

Anthony LaBella of GameRevolution praised PS4 version's stealth element, action-packed sequences, detailed single-player campaign, compelling and fast-paced multiplayer and the Heist mode, which requires players to utilize teamwork. He also praised the other new modes featured in the game such as Hotwire and Crosshair, which he stated "has showcased the transition from warfare to crime and provide plenty of entertainment outside of the traditional Battlefield experience". However, he criticized the predictable plot, flat characters, poor presentation of the campaign and the uninteresting story. He summarized the review by saying that "The combination of the stealth-focused campaign and many multiplayer modes establishes Battlefield Hardline as a worthwhile standalone entry in the popular FPS franchise." Brian Albert of IGN praised the game's enjoyable campaign, surprising comedic moments, decent plot, voice-acting and animation, likeable characters, well-designed levels, realistic weapons and audio, rewarding stealth, as well as the single-player campaign for requiring the player to utilize patience and skill and the game for encouraging players to use non-lethal takedown. He also praised the huge variety of multiplayer modes, the dynamic Hotwire mode and the well-designed and varied maps. He also praised the new gameplay features such as the grappling hook and zip-line for making transversal faster. However, he criticized the unlock system for not awarding players in accordance to their playstyles and the overly-simplistic AI. He summarized the review by saying that "Battlefield's first foray into stealth makes for a fresh campaign, and the multiplayer has something for everyone."

Jeff Marchiafava of Game Informer said that the PS4 version's single-player campaign "is a mess", and that its ending is "facepalm-worthy". However, he also said that the multiplayer mode is "still worthy of the Battlefield name". He summarized his review by saying that while the single-player campaign "falls flat, the heart of the Battlefield franchise beats on – albeit at a different tempo". Ben Griffin of GamesRadar+ praised its new-players friendly and compelling multiplayer, refreshing multiplayer modes, rewarding interrogations system and detailed character models. However, he criticised the unfocused campaign, simplistic and predictable AI, as well as the campaign's over-reliance on stealth, which he stated "has never evolved during the campaign". He summarized the review by saying that "While not quite as main-event-essential as previous Battlefield blockbusters, the tighter, faster Hardline is most definitely the good cop."

Jeff Gerstmann of Giant Bomb praised the game's collectibles, which he stated "have actual context"; he criticised the idiotic AI partners as well as the poor story which has failed to deliver character development, tension and logic. He summarized the review by saying that "Battlefield Hardline is hardly a disaster, but it feels like a franchise spinning its wheels with minor adjustments, rather than truly advancing forward." He also noted that the game generally enjoyed a more stable launch than its predecessor Battlefield 4, as he stated that the game performs functionally across all platforms. Brett Phillips of VideoGamer.com strongly criticized the PS4 version's campaign, calling it "the worst campaign in the entire series". He also criticized its poorly-designed spawn points, unnecessary item-scanning, clichéd twists, anarchic and inconsistent Conquest mode, boring and frustrating Hotwire mode, as well as the removal of heavy weapons such as rocket launcher from the weapon menu. The progression system was also criticized for being incongruous with the narrative of the game. He also criticized the map design for lacking imagination and verticality, matches for lasting too long and the game itself for not taking any risks. He called the game "a forgettable, immature experience rather than one worth talking about" and he summarized the review by saying that "Battlefield Hardline could have been something unique, a chance for Visceral to place its own stamp on a long-standing franchise. What we instead get is a laughably-shambolic campaign and multiplayer that is merely serviceable and too timid to step out of Battlefield 4's shadow."

Adam Rosenberg of Digital Trends gave the Xbox One version a score of four-and-a-half stars out of five, calling it "a two-pronged success, with a killer cops-and-robbers story backed by a speedy take on competitive play." Dean Takahashi of VentureBeat gave the Xbox One version a score of 86 out of 100, saying, "Overall, I think that EA and Visceral have established a new franchise within the Battlefield series, and one that could live on for many years to come." Chris Holzworth of EGMNow gave the PS4 version 7.5 out of 10, saying that it "might not reinvent the wheel the series rolls on, but it certainly makes it spin a whole lot smoother. Speeded up gameplay, an opened-up single-player, and a robust suite of new multiplayer modes lends itself to the best Battlefield to date—though that's not saying much, a decade later." Edge gave the PC version a score of seven out of ten, saying, "It feels like just that: a lower-budget sideshow to the glitzy main event." Mat Growcott of Push Square gave the PS4 version a score of seven stars out of ten, calling it "a decent game that gets points for originality of concept, but how much value it has is down to how much you enjoyed previous entries in the franchise, and how much you'd like to see the Cop FPS genre become a thing." Kirk McKeand of The Daily Telegraph gave the same PS4 version a score of six out of ten, saying, "There is still a great multiplayer shooter here, but it feels more like an expansion than a full sequel - if it wasn't for the campaign, Hardline would be Battlefield 4's version of Bad Company 2's Vietnam expansion - it even has the vehicle music. It just forgot to bring the personality."

James McMurtie of National Post gave the PC version seven out of ten, saying, "Hardline's release was smooth, and although it did feel like a modified BF4, it also plays like something novel and worthwhile all on its own." Mike LeChavalier of Slant Magazine gave the PS4 version a score of three-and-a-half stars out of five, saying, "It wouldn't be a Battlefield game without a host of multiplayer scenarios, and Hardline is definitely no slouch in that department, even if the assortment of options lack a certain sweeping freshness that would have been greatly appreciated." David Jenkins of Metro gave the same PS4 version seven out of ten, saying, "The cops 'n' robbers theme often does more harm than good to the Battlefield formula, but this peculiar spin-off has just enough tricks of is [sic] own to be worth a collar." Andrew Phillips of The Digital Fix gave the Xbox One version six out of ten, calling it "a Battlefield game with weak single player and solid if underwhelming multiplayer - absolutely no one saw this coming." Ebenezer Samuel of New York Daily News gave the same console version three stars out of five, saying, "The end result is a Battlefield game that's solid, but not spectacular. Visceral takes the series narrative where its never been before, builds a solid story, and adds little pieces that have potential." However, Michael Thomsen of The Washington Post gave the PC version an unfavorable review, saying, "Hardline works best in its multiplayer portion where it abandons the pretensions of police work and storytelling. Playing Battlefield online is stepping into a sprawling tempest of gunfire with 63 other players. Here, violence has a cross-canceling effect, in which neither side is granted automatic authority and every power and ability can be questioned by the other side."

One aspect of the game that was singled out by games media was a set of Easter eggs: when reloading a gun, there is a one in 10000 chance that instead of the standard reload animation, a comically absurd animation will play, which the press called "hilarious" and "zany".

=== Sales ===
The retail version of Battlefield Hardline debuted at No. 1 in the UK software sales chart in its first launch week. It also became the best-selling title in the UK in 2015 as of March 23, 2015. According to NPD Group, the game was the best-selling game in March in the United States.
