= Battlefield 4 =

2013 video game

- Developer: DICE (Note: DICE LA developed the DLC. Additional work done by Visceral Games.)
- Publisher: Electronic Arts
- Directors: Lars Gustavsson; Stefan Strandberg
- Producers: Aleksander Grøndal; Tobias Dahl
- Designers: Thomas Andersson; Mikael Kasurinen; Linus Josephson
- Programmer: Vidar Nygren
- Artist: Gustav Tilleby
- Writers: Jesse Stern; Mikael Säker; Adrian Vershinin
- Composers: Johan Skugge; Jukka Rintamäki
- Series: Battlefield
- Engine: Frostbite 3
- Platforms: Microsoft Windows; PlayStation 3; Xbox 360; PlayStation 4; Xbox One
- Release: October 29, 2013: PC, PS3, XBOX360; NA: October 29, 2013; AU: October 31, 2013; NZ: November 1, 2013; EU: November 1, 2013 PlayStation 4; NA: November 15, 2013; EU: November 29, 2013 Xbox One; WW: November 22, 2013
- Genre: First-person shooter
- Modes: Single-player, multiplayer

Battlefield 4 is a 2013 first-person shooter game developed by DICE and published by Electronic Arts. The game was released in October and November for Microsoft Windows, PlayStation 3, Xbox 360, PlayStation 4, and Xbox One. It is the thirteenth installment in the Battlefield series and is the sequel of 2011's Battlefield 3, taking place six years later during the fictional "War of 2020".

Battlefield 4 was met with positive reception for its multiplayer mode, gameplay and graphics, but was criticized for its single-player campaign and for numerous bugs and glitches in the multiplayer. It was a commercial success, selling over seven million copies.

The game was delisted from the PlayStation 3 and Xbox 360 storefronts on July 31, 2024, and online servers were shut down on November 7, 2024, for both platforms.

== Gameplay ==
The game's heads-up display (HUD) is composed of two compact rectangles. The lower left-hand corner features a mini-map and compass for navigation, and a simplified objective notice above it; the lower right includes a compact ammo counter and health meter. The top right displays kill notifications of all players in-game. On the Windows version of the game, the top left features a chat window when in multiplayer. The mini-map, as well as the main game screen, shows symbols denoting three kinds of entities: blue for allies, green for squadmates, and orange for enemies, this applies to all interactivity on the battlefield. The in-game options also allow colour-blind players to change the on-screen colour indicators to: tritanomaly, deuteranomaly and protanomaly.

Weapon customization is expansive and encouraged. Primary and secondary weapons can be customized with weapon attachments and camouflage or 'skins'. Most weapons can also change between different firing modes (automatic, semi-automatic, and burst fire), allowing the player to adapt to the environment they find themselves in. Players can "spot" the opponent's players and vehicles. Spotting marks the opponents position to the player's team both on the mini-map and with a triangle icon above the opponent's player model or vehicle specific icon above the vehicle. This can be done both in the single-player campaign (for the first time in the Battlefield franchise) as well as in multiplayer. The game's bullet-dropping-system has been significantly enhanced, forcing the player to change the way they play medium to long distance combat. In addition, players have more combat capabilities, such as countering melee attacks from the front while standing or crouching, shooting with their sidearm while swimming, and diving underwater to avoid enemy detection. Standard combat abilities are still current including, reloading whilst sprinting, unlimited sprint, prone and vaulting.

=== Campaign ===
The single-player campaign has several differences from the main multiplayer component. For the most part, the player must traverse mini-sandbox-style levels, in some cases using vehicles, like tanks and boats, to traverse the environment. As the player character, Recker, the player can use two campaign-only functions: the Engage command and the tactical binocular. The Engage command directs Recker's squadmates, and occasionally other friendly units, to attack any hostiles in Recker's line of sight. The tactical binocular is similar to a laser-designator, in the sense that it allows the player to identify friendly and enemy units, weapon stashes, explosives, and objectives in the field. By identifying enemies, the player can make them visible without using the visor, making them easier to mark for their teammates. At one point, Recker will briefly lose the tactical visor, forcing them to only use the Engage command to direct his squadmates on a limited number of enemies.

The campaign features assignments that require specific actions and unlock weapons for use in multiplayer upon completion. Collectible weapons return along with the introduction of collectible dog tags which can be used in multiplayer. Weapon crates are found throughout all levels, allowing players to obtain ammo and switch weapons. While crates hold default weapons, collectible weapons may be used whenever they are acquired and level-specific weapons may be used once a specific mission assignment has been completed by obtaining enough points in a level.

=== Multiplayer ===
The new Commander Mode interface in Battlefield 4, showing an overhead view of the map "Siege of Shanghai"

Battlefield 4's multiplayer contains three playable factions—the United States, China, and Russia—fighting against each other, in up to 64-player matches on PC, PlayStation 4, and Xbox One (24-Player on Xbox 360 and PS3). A newly reintroduced "Commander Mode", last seen in Battlefield 2142, gives one player on each team a real-time strategy-like view of the entire map and the ability to give orders to teammates. Also, the Commander can observe the battle through the eyes of the players on the battlefield, deploying vehicle and weapon drops to "keep the war machinery going", and order in missile strikes on hostile targets. A spectator mode is included, enabling players to spectate others in first or third person, as well as use a free camera to pan around the map from any angle.

On June 10, 2013, at E3, DICE featured the map "Siege of Shanghai", depicting the People's Liberation Army against the U.S. Marine Corps. The gameplay showcased Commander Mode; new weapons and vehicles; and the "Levolution" gameplay mechanic. The video displays the last of these at various points, including: a player destroying a support pillar to trap an enemy tank above it; and a large skyscraper (with an in-game objective on the top floor) collapsing in the center of the map, kicking up a massive dust cloud throughout the map and bringing the objective closer to ground level. Levolution also includes effects such as shooting a fire extinguisher to fill the room with obscuring clouds, car alarms going off when stepped on, metal detectors going off once passed through, or cutting the power in a room to reduce others' visibility.

The maps included in the main game are "Siege of Shanghai", "Paracel Storm", "Zavod 311", "Lancang Dam", "Flood Zone", "Rogue Transmission", "Hainan Resort", "Dawnbreaker", "Operation Locker" and "Golmud Railway". The game modes on offer include Battlefield's Conquest, Domination and Rush; while adding two new game modes called Obliteration and Defuse, along with traditional game modes such as Team Deathmatch and Squad Deathmatch.

The four kits from Battlefield 3 are present in Battlefield 4 with minor tweaks. The Assault kit must now wait for the defibrillator to recharge after reviving teammates in quick succession. The Engineer kit uses PDWs, and carbines are available to all kits. The support kit has access to the new remote mortar and the XM25 allowing for indirect suppressive fire. The Recon kit is now more mobile and is able to equip carbines, designated marksman rifles (DMRs), and C-4. Sniping mechanics also give with the ability to zero in your sights (set an aiming distance), and equip more optics and accessories than previous Battlefield games. The Recon kit is still able to utilize the MAV, T-UGS, and the Radio Beacon (Spawn Beacon).

New vehicles have also been introduced. With the addition of the Chinese faction, new vehicles include the Type 99 MBT, the ZFB-05 armored car, and the Z-10W attack helicopter. Jets have also been rebalanced and put into two classes, "attack" and "stealth". The attack jets focus is mainly air-to-ground capabilities, while stealth jets focus mainly on air-to-air combat. Another vehicle added in Battlefield 4 is the addition of the RCB and DV-15 Interceptor attack boats, which function as heavily armed aquatic assault craft.

Customization options have also been increased in Battlefield 4, with all new camos available for every gun and vehicle. A new "adaptive" camo has been introduced that can adapt the camo to the map being played without the player having to change camos every map. Camos can now be applied to jets, helicopters, tanks, transport vehicles, guns, and soldiers themselves. Previously this option was introduced to parachutes but has been removed, emblems are now printed onto parachutes.

== Synopsis ==
=== Setting and characters ===
Battlefield 4's single-player Campaign takes place during the fictional "War of 2020", six years after the events of its predecessor. Tensions between Russia and the United States have been running at a record high, due to a conflict between the two countries that has been running for the last six years. On top of this, Admiral Chang, the main antagonist, plans with Russian support to overthrow China's current government and if he succeeds, then both countries can form an alliance against the United States.

The player controls Sgt. Daniel "Reck" Recker, second-in-command of an U.S. Marine Corps Force Recon squad callsigned "Tombstone". His squadmates include squad leader SSgt. William Dunn (Charlie Weber), Heavy Weapon Specialist SSgt. Kimble "Irish" Graves (Michael K. Williams), and field medic Sgt. Clayton "Pac" Pakowski (Andrew Lawrence). Early in the Campaign, Tombstone is joined by CIA operative Laszlo W. Kovic, originally known as "Agent W." (Thor Edgell) from Battlefield 3's Campaign; and Chinese Secret Service agent Huang "Hannah" Shuyi (Jessika Van). The Campaign also sees the return of Dimitri "Dima" Mayakovsky (Pasha D. Lychnikoff) from Battlefield 3's Campaign—still alive after the nuclear detonation in Paris six years ago, and under the Chinese military's custody for unknown reasons.

=== Plot ===
Six years after the events in Battlefield 3, a squad of U.S. Force Recon Marines, codenamed "Tombstone" (consisting of Dunn, the squad's leader, Sergeant Recker, Irish, and Pac) attempts to escape from Azerbaijan with vital intelligence about a potential military uprising in China. After being trapped underwater in a car while being pursued by Russian special forces, Dunn, critically wounded and trapped, sacrifices himself by ordering the squad to break the windshield and escape, leaving Recker in charge of Tombstone. Reuniting with their commanding officer Captain Garrison, codenamed "Fortress", Tombstone learns that Admiral Chang, head of the Chinese army, has taken control of China with Russian support, and eliminated Chinese presidential candidate Jin Jié, a progressive politician seeking reforms within the Chinese government. The group finds itself sent to Shanghai with orders to rescue two VIPs: a woman named Hannah, and her husband, with assistance from an intelligence agent named Kovic.

Although the rescue is a success and Kovic takes the VIPs back to the USS Valkyrie, a Wasp-class amphibious assault ship, Tombstone becomes trapped in the city and is forced to rescue civilians against Pac's protests. Shortly after returning to the Valkyrie, Garrison assigns Kovic as head of the squad, and sends them to the USS Titan, a Nimitz-class aircraft carrier that had just been attacked, to recover its voyage data recorder before the wreckage sinks. Upon returning to the Valkyrie, Tombstone finds the ship under assault by Chinese Marines. The squad rescues Garrison and the VIPs, but Kovic is fatally wounded and passes control of the squad to Recker. Learning that China's air force is grounded due to a storm, Garrison assigns Tombstone to assist US forces planning to assault the Chinese-controlled Singapore airfield to weaken the Chinese air superiority. Hannah volunteers to join Tombstone on their mission, much to Irish's chagrin.

Despite the airfield being destroyed by a missile strike, Pac is separated from Tombstone during evacuation and assumed killed in the blast. Hannah then ostensibly betrays Recker and Irish, allowing both to be captured by Chinese soldiers. Both men are imprisoned in the Kunlun Mountains for interrogation under Chang's orders. In his cell, Recker finds himself befriended by a Russian prisoner named "Dima" (a survivor of the Paris nuclear blast, now suffering from radiation poisoning). The two escape from their cell, start a mass prison riot and use the chaos to make their escape, with Recker rescuing Irish along the way. As the Chinese military arrives to quell the riot, Hannah prevents the group from being recaptured by a group of soldiers. Although Irish mistrusts her, Hannah reveals her action was necessary for her mission, revealing her husband is in fact Jin Jié, who survived Chang's assassination attempt.

The group uses a tram to leave the mountains, only for it to be shot down by an enemy helicopter, killing Dima in the crash. Forced to make their way down on foot with privation, the group eventually finds a jeep and drives towards the US-occupied city of Tashgar. During the journey, Hannah reveals how she lost her family to Chang's men after bringing Jin Jié to meet them, causing Irish to make amends with her for his behavior. Upon reaching Tashgar, the squad finds US troops being besieged by both Chinese and Russian forces, and offers assistance to the US commander by destroying a nearby dam, flooding the area and eliminating the opposing forces. Learning the Valkyrie is within the region of the Suez Canal, Tombstone is airlifted to the ship, and arrives to warn the vessel that they are blindly heading towards Chang's navy. Stopping Chinese forces from boarding the ship, the squad soon finds Jin Jié amongst other survivors, including Pac (who had survived the events in Singapore).

Knowing he must show his face, as Chinese forces had been fighting under the assumption he was dead, Jin Jié convinces Recker to let him show his face and calm tensions between the three forces. The assault quickly ends with Chinese soldiers beginning to spread the news of Jin Jié's return. Chang, wanting to prevent this and conceal the truth, proceeds to barrage the Valkyrie with his personal warship. Recker, Irish, and Hannah decide to board Chang's warship and destroy it with C-4 explosives. However, when they fail to detonate, Irish and Hannah each volunteer to manually replace the charges, sacrificing his or her own life. If the player does nothing, Chang destroys the Valkyrie, killing Pac, Garrison and Jin Jié; if the player chooses Irish or Hannah to rearm the explosives, he or she will be reported missing in action after the warship's destruction, while the survivor and Recker are recovered by the Valkyrie. (Note: Canonically, Irish and Pac survive, as revealed in the events of Battlefield 2042, revealing that sacrificing Hannah is the canonical ending.) During the credits, the player hears new dialogue between Irish and Hannah, discussing their pasts, and how they have to keep moving forward with no regrets.

== Development ==
Electronic Arts president Frank Gibeau confirmed the company's intention to release a sequel to Battlefield 3 during a keynote at the University of Southern California where he said "There is going to be a Battlefield 4". Afterwards, an EA spokesperson told IGN: "Frank was speaking broadly about the Battlefield brand—a brand that EA is deeply passionate about and a fan community that EA is committed to." On the eve of Battlefield 3's launch, EA Digital Illusions CE told Eurogamer it was the Swedish studio's hope that it would one day get the opportunity to make Battlefield 4. "This feels like day one now," executive producer Patrick Bach said. "It's exciting. The whole Frostbite 2 thing has opened up a big landscape ahead of us so we can do whatever we want."

Battlefield 4 is built on the new Frostbite 3 engine. The new Frostbite engine enables more realistic environments with higher resolution textures and particle effects. A new "networked water" system is also being introduced, allowing all players in the game to see the same wave at the same time. Tessellation has also been overhauled. An Alpha Trial commenced on June 17, 2013, with invitations randomly emailed to Battlefield 3 players the day prior. The trial ran for two weeks and featured the Siege of Shanghai map with all of its textures removed, essentially making it a "whitebox" test.

Due to mixed reception of the two-player Co-op Mode in Battlefield 3, DICE decided to omit the mode from Battlefield 4 to focus on improving both the campaign and multiplayer components instead.

AMD and DICE have partnered for AMD's Mantle API to be used on Battlefield 4. The goal was to boost performance on AMD GCN Radeon graphic cards providing a higher level of hardware-optimized performance than was previously possible with OpenGL or DirectX. Initial tests of AMD's Mantle showed it was an effective enhancement for slower processors.

DICE released an Open Beta for the game that was available on Windows (64-bit only), Xbox 360 and PlayStation 3. It featured the game-modes Domination, Conquest and Obliteration which were playable on the map Siege of Shanghai. The Open Beta started on October 4, 2013, and ended on October 15, 2013.

=== Technical issues and legal troubles ===
Upon release, Battlefield 4 was riddled with major technical bugs, glitches and crashes across all platforms. EA and DICE soon began releasing several patches for the game on all systems and DICE later revealed that work on all of its future games (including Mirror's Edge, Star Wars: Battlefront and Battlefield 4 DLC) would be halted until Battlefield 4 was working properly. In December 2013, more than a month after the game's initial release, an EA representative said, "We know we still have a ways to go with fixing the game – it is absolutely our #1 priority. The team at DICE is working non-stop to update the game."

EA President Peter Moore announced in January 2014 that the company did not see any negative impact to sales as a result of the myriad technical issues. He said any negative impacts to sales were actually due to the transition from current-generation (PS3, Xbox 360) to next-generation consoles (PS4, Xbox One), and that other video game franchises like FIFA and Need for Speed were experiencing similar effects. As a reward for players who bought the game early and continued to play it despite all of the bugs and glitches, DICE rewarded players in February 2014 with all-month-long, free multi-player content such as: bronze and silver Battlepacks, XP boosts and events, camouflage skins, shortcut bundles for weapons and additional content for Premium members.

Because of the widespread bugs and glitches that were present, EA became the target of multiple law firms. The firm Holzer Holzer & Fistel, LLC launched an investigation into EA's public statements made between July 24 and December 4, 2013, to determine if the company intentionally misled its investors with information pertaining to, "the development and sales of the Company's Battlefield 4 video game and the game's impact on EA's revenue and projects moving forward." Shortly thereafter, the law firm Robbins Geller Rudman & Dowd LLP similarly filed a class action lawsuit against EA for releasing false or misleading statements about the quality of Battlefield 4. A second class action lawsuit was announced only days later from the firm Bower Piven, which alleged that EA violated the Securities Exchange Act of 1934 by not properly informing its investors about the major bugs and glitches during development that may have prevented the investors from making an informed decision about Battlefield 4. Bower Piven sought out investors who lost more than US$200,000 to become the lead plaintiff. In October 2014, Judge Susan Illston dismissed one of the class action suits' original case on the grounds that EA did not intentionally mislead investors, instead its pre-release claims about Battlefield 4 were a "vague statement of corporate optimism", "an inactionable opinion" and "puffery".

Six months after the initial release of the game, in April 2014, DICE released a program called Community Test Environment (CTE), which let a limited number of PC gamers play a different version of Battlefield 4 that was designed to test new patches and updates before giving them a wide-release. One of the major patches tested was an update to the game's netcode, specifically the "tickrate", which is how frequently the game and server would update, measured in cycles per second. Because of the size of Battlefield 4 in terms of information, DICE initially chose to have a low tickrate. However, the low tickrate resulted in a number of issues including damage registration and "trade kills". The CTE program tested the game at a higher tickrate, among other common problems, and began rolling out patches in mid-2014.

In October 2014, nearly a full year after the official release with major updates still being put out, DICE LA producer David Sirland said the company acknowledged that the release of Battlefield 4 "absolutely" damaged the trust of the franchise's fanbase. Sirland said that the shaky release of Battlefield 4 caused the company to reevaluate their release model, and plan on being more transparent and offer earlier beta tests with future installments, namely (at the time) with Battlefield Hardline (2015). Sirland also said: "We still probably have a lot of players who won't trust us to deliver a stable launch or a stable game. I don't want to say anything because I want to do. I want them to look at what we're doing and what we are going to do and that would be my answer. I think we have to do things to get them to trust us, not say things to get them to trust us. Show by doing."

== Marketing ==
In March 2013, Electronic Arts opened the Battlefield 4 website with three official teasers, entitled "Prepare 4 Battle". Each hints at three kinds of battlespace: air, land and sea. EA then continued to release teaser trailers leading up to the unveiling of Battlefield 4 at the Game Developers Conference on March 26, 2013. The following day, Battlefield 4's first gameplay trailer, which doubled as a showcase for the Frostbite 3 engine was released. Shortly thereafter, EA listed the game for pre-order on Origin for Microsoft Windows, PlayStation 3, and Xbox 360; however, EA excluded any mention of the next generation consoles.

In July 2012, Battlefield 4 was announced when EA advertised on their Origin client that those who pre-ordered Medal of Honor: Warfighter (either Digital Deluxe or the limited edition) would receive early access to the Battlefield 4 beta, this has since been expanded to include any Battlefield 3 Premium owners, and any Origin users who pre-purchase Battlefield 4 Digital Deluxe Edition. Although players who qualify for access in more than one way will only be granted one beta pass for their account and is non transferable to other players. The "Exclusive" beta started on October 1, 2013, with the open beta that went live on October 4. The beta will be on three platforms, PC, Xbox 360, and PlayStation 3 and features the Siege of Shanghai map on the Conquest game mode.

DICE revealed more Battlefield 4 content in the E3 2013 event at June 10, 2013, such as multiplayer modes, and allowed participants to play the game at the same event. More information was released at Gamescom 2013 in Cologne, Germany, such as the "Paracel Storm" multiplayer map and Battlefield 4 Premium. Battlefield 4 Premium includes five digital expansion packs featuring new maps and in-game content. Two-weeks early access to all expansion packs. Personalization options including camos, paints, emblems, dog tags and more. Priority position in server queues. Weekly updates with new content. Double XP events, 12 Battle Packs. Battle Packs are digital packages that contain a combination of new weapon accessories, dog tags, knives, XP boosts, and character customization items, three are included with all pre-orders of the Origin Digital Deluxe edition. The service will also transfer your Premium membership from Xbox 360 to Xbox One or PS3 to PS4. Premium membership pre-orders started the day the service was announced (August 21, 2013). DICE has also announced that if you purchase the game for a current generation system (PlayStation 3 or Xbox 360) you will be able to trade it in for a PlayStation 4 or Xbox One version of the game for as little as $10. Additionally all PlayStation 3 and 4 copies will include a code in the box to redeem a digital copy on the PlayStation Store.

An important strategy of DICE's market strategy to promote Battlefield 4 was the series of TV and web advertisements entitled Only in Battlefield 4. Each one of these TV spots was narrated by a player of Battlefield 4 describing one of the unique experiences they encountered, along with a re-creation of the event using gameplay footage. These advertisements highlighted the free-form nature of the upcoming game, such as the destructibility of the environment and the dynamic nature of the game's combat engine. These events included things such as demonstrating the new Levolution feature, upgrades to gameplay, and unscripted moments that cannot occur in other games' multiplayer mode.

Due to poor reception from gamers, on May 30, 2013, EA discontinued the online pass for all existing and future EA games including Battlefield 4.

A companion application was also released for iOS and Android.

== Downloadable content ==
Battlefield 4 featured a total of five downloadable content (DLC) packs that included new maps and additions to gameplay. All five DLC packs were developed by DICE LA and were available two weeks prior to their scheduled release by players who had purchased Premium. Once support for Battlefield 4 Premium ended, DICE LA announced all future DLC would be free.

=== China Rising ===
On May 21, 2013, DICE unveiled Battlefield 4: China Rising on a Battlelog post and stated that it would include four new maps (Silk Road, Altai Range, Dragon Pass, and Guilin Peaks) in mainland China, ten new assignments, new vehicles, as well as the Air Superiority gametype. It is available to those who pre-ordered the game at no extra cost. It was released to premium players on December 3, 2013, followed by a general release on December 17, 2013.

=== Second Assault ===
On June 10, 2013, DICE LA unveiled Battlefield 4: Second Assault during the Microsoft Press Conference at E3 2013. It was announced that it would be the first expansion pack to be released for Battlefield 4 and would debut on the Xbox One. It was released on November 22, 2013, the same day the Xbox One was launched. The expansion features the return of four fan-favorite maps from Battlefield 3 and introduces Capture the Flag as a new gametype. On February 18, 2014, Second Assault became available as Premium exclusive for Xbox 360, PlayStation 3, PlayStation 4, and PC. It became available for non-Premium users on March 4, 2014.

During January 29 – February 28, 2015, the expansion was free of charge to all EA Access subscribers.

=== Naval Strike ===
On August 20, 2013, DICE LA unveiled Battlefield 4: Naval Strike at Gamescom 2013. It involves dynamic combat on four new maps, Wave Breaker, Nansha Strike, Operation Mortar, and Lost Islands, which take place in the South China Sea and features a new mode called "Carrier Assault" inspired by Battlefield 2142. The original release date was planned for March 25, 2014 for premium members and April 8, 2014, for non-premium members but was delayed several hours before release for Xbox One and PC without a new release date being set. On March 26, 2014, Naval Strike was released for premium members on PlayStation 3, PlayStation 4 and Xbox 360. The Xbox One version was released for premium members on March 27, 2014, and the PC version was released on March 31, 2014.

=== Dragon's Teeth ===
At Gamescom 2013, DICE LA unveiled Battlefield 4: Dragon's Teeth. Its maps take place in war-torn cities locked down by the People's Liberation Army. Dragon's Teeth was released on July 15, 2014, for Battlefield 4 Premium Members. For Non-Premium members it was released 2 weeks later on July 29, 2014. A new game mode included in this Dragon's Teeth DLC is called "Chain Link". There are four new maps included in Dragon's Teeth called "Lumphini Garden, Pearl Market, Propaganda, and Sunken Dragon". There are 11 new Assignments and a new assault drone called the "RAWR" that can be found on those four maps.

=== Final Stand ===
On August 20, 2013, DICE LA unveiled Battlefield 4: Final Stand at Gamescom 2013. Final Stand focuses on the conclusion of the in-game war of 2020. It includes four new maps and "secret prototype weapons and vehicles". The four maps that are included are "Operation Whiteout", "Giants of Karelia", "Hammerhead" and "Hangar 21". New weapons include the Rorsch X1 Handheld Railgun and some gadgets including the DS-3 Decoy and XD-1 Accipiter MKV, as well as a hovercraft tank based on the Levkov 1937 Hovercraft MBT. It was released for Battlefield 4 Premium members on November 18, 2014, 00:01 and for non-Premium Battlefield 4 players on December 2, 2014, 00:01.

=== Weapons Crate ===
The Weapons Crate DLC was announced by DICE LA on March 30, 2015, as a free DLC. The DLC added five weapons into the game: the Mare's Leg, AN-94, Groza-1, Groza-4 and the L86A2 along with the gamemode from Battlefield 3 'Gun Master' and many other stat changes. It was released in an alpha form in the Community Test Environment. It was released along with the Spring 2015 Patch on May 26, 2015.

=== Night Operations ===
In August 2015, DICE and DICE LA announced the expansion pack Night Operations, a free DLC pack. The first map to be released was Zavod: Graveyard shift, a night time version of the Battlefield 4 map Zavod 311, it was released with the Summer 2015 Patch. Two other night maps were also in development, a night time version of the map Siege of Shanghai and Golmud Railway, these maps were playable in the Battlefield 4 Community Test Environment but would remain unreleased as further development on Battlefield 4 ended. All three maps were developed by DICE LA and tested in the Community Test Environment with player feedback taken on board.

=== Community Operations ===
Community Operations was released on October 27, 2015, a free DLC pack. The map, Outbreak, is a medium-sized level with much vegetation such as trees, shrubs, and grass for ambushing the enemies within. There are limited amounts of heavy vehicles such as tanks, LAVs and no anti-air vehicles. The map does not include air dominance such as stealth jets, scout helicopters and attack aircraft. This map was created by DICE Los Angeles and the Battlefield 4 gaming community. The update contains major changes to weapons and vehicles.

=== Legacy Operations ===
Legacy Operations was released on December 15, 2015, a free DLC pack. The map is an updated version of the Battlefield 2 map, Dragon Valley. It was released alongside the Winter Patch content update.

=== Premium ===
Premium is a downloadable pass that offers all of the downloadable content for a discounted price. Premium offers a range of personalization options and items, such as exclusive dog tags or camos. Premium contributes to the game by offering select days in which special events take place only for premium members.

== Reception ==
=== Critical reception ===
Reception

Aggregate score
Aggregator	Score				
Aggregator	PC	PS3	PS4	Xbox 360	Xbox One
Metacritic	81/100	80/100	85/100	79/100	81/100

Review scores
Publication	Score				
Publication	PC	PS3	PS4	Xbox 360	Xbox One
GameSpot	8/10	8/10	8/10	8/10	8/10
GameZone	8/10	N/A	N/A	N/A	N/A
IGN	8.5/10	8/10	8.5/10	8/10	8.5/10
Joystiq	4.5/5	4.5/5	5/5	4.5/5	5/5
Official Xbox Magazine (US)	N/A	N/A	N/A	8/10	8.5/10
PC Gamer (US)	84/100	N/A	N/A	N/A	N/A
Inside Gaming	9.5/10	9/10	9.5/10	9/10	9.5/10

Battlefield 4 received positive reviews from critics. Chris Watters of GameSpot gave praise to Obliteration Mode and the multiplayer elements but was otherwise unimpressed with the campaign. IGN's Mitch Dyer stated that "Battlefield 4 is a greatest hits album of DICE's multiplayer legacy" for same versions. Evan Lahti of PC Gamer stated that although the game strongly resembles Battlefield 3 it still manages to remain "a visually and sonically satisfying, reliably intense FPS". Commander Mode and the diverse map selection within multiplayer were also praised as being good additions to the game. Joystiq's David Hinkle said that the game "drops players into a sandbox and unhooks all tethers, loosing scores of soldiers to squad up and take down the opposition however they choose". Hinkle praised the campaign elements, but found the multiplayer to not hold any surprises. GameZone's Lance Liebl stated "Your success in Battlefield is up to you and how well you work as a team. And it's one of the most rewarding games I've played. Battlelog needs some refinement, and there's still way too many crashes, but the multiplayer more than makes up for all of it." Machinima's Lawrence Sonntag praised the Levolution feature and the multiplayer mode.

However, several reviewers noted that the multiplayer part of the game had been released with a lot of game-breaking bugs on PC, PlayStation 4 and Xbox One, such as server crashes and lag. Polygon reviewed the game the day of its release, and gave it 7.5, then later downgraded their score to 4 after acknowledging that the game "was still barely playable for many players".

DICE later acknowledged the issues with the multiplayer part of the game and said they were working to fix them, and that they would not work on expansions or future projects until the game problems were resolved. Despite this promise, the game's second expansion was released while numerous recurring problems had yet to be resolved.

=== Ban in China ===
In late December 2013, shortly after the release of the "China Rising" DLC pack, China banned the sale of Battlefield 4, requesting stores and online vendors to remove the game and encouraging those who have already purchased the game to remove it from their consoles and/or PCs. The game was viewed as a national security risk in the form of a cultural invasion as the DLC includes four maps in mainland China.

An editorial from the China National Defense Newspaper (a subsidiary of the PLA Daily) published in December 2013 criticized the game for discrediting China's national sovereignty, and stated that while in the past the Soviet Union would often be used as an imaginary enemy in video games, the game has recently shifted to China. The editorial received significant negative reception amongst Chinese internet users who were generally supportive of how Battlefield 4 was developed.

=== Sales ===
During the first week of sales in the United Kingdom, Battlefield 4 became the second best-selling game on all available formats, only behind Assassin's Creed IV: Black Flag. The game's sales were down 69% compared to 2011's Battlefield 3. EA blamed the fall in demand on uncertainty caused by the upcoming transition to eighth generation consoles.

The PlayStation 3 version of Battlefield 4 topped the Media Create sales charts in Japan during its first week of release, ahead of Pokémon X and Y which has topped the charts for the past four weeks, by selling 121,699 copies. The PlayStation 3 version of Battlefield 4 Sales in Japan however fell 84.148% to only 19,291 copies in its second week of release, and losing number one to God Eater 2.

According to NPD Group figures, Battlefield 4 was the second best-selling game of November in the United States, only behind Call of Duty: Ghosts. In February 2014, EA announced that the Premium service for the game had sold more than 1.6 million copies. In May 2014, the game had sold more than 7 million copies.

=== Awards ===
According to EA, Battlefield 4 received awards from over 30 gaming publications prior to its release. Battlefield 4 appeared on several year-end lists of the best First-person shooter games of 2013, receiving wins from 18th Satellite Awards, and GamesRadar. During the 17th Annual D.I.C.E. Awards, the Academy of Interactive Arts & Sciences nominated Battlefield 4 for "Action Game of the Year", "Online Game of the Year", "Outstanding Achievement in Sound Design", and "Outstanding Achievement in Visual Engineering".
