= Mario Kart Tour =

2019 video game

- Cover art, depicting Mario and other characters on a globe with landmarks from cities present in the game
- Developer: Nintendo EPD (Note: Additional work by DeNA, SRD and Bandai Namco Studios)
- Publisher: Nintendo
- Directors: Kosuke Yabuki; Yugo Hayashi; Shinya Fujiwara
- Producer: Hideki Konno
- Programmer: Erika Abe
- Series: Mario Kart
- Engine: Unity
- Platforms: Android, iOS
- Release: September 25, 2019 – September 30, 2026 (7 years and 5 days)
- Genre: Kart racing
- Modes: Single-player, multiplayer

Mario Kart Tour (Note: Japanese: マリオカート ツアー, Hepburn: Mario Kāto Tsuā) was a 2019 kart racing game developed and published by Nintendo for Android and iOS. The game featured biweekly, downloadable themed tours with different cups, each of which had three courses and a bonus challenge. Courses were based on those that have appeared previously in the Mario Kart series, as well as new ones that are based on real-world cities.

Mario Kart Tour was announced in January 2018 and was released on September 25, 2019, on Apple's App Store and Google Play. The game received mixed reviews from critics, who praised its simple gameplay and controls but criticized its monetization and gacha elements as well as its lack of characters at launch. Reception improved over time following additional content releases and removal of the gacha elements. The game was shut down on September 29, 2026, at 11:00 p.m. Pacific Daylight Time.

== Gameplay ==
In-game screenshot of Mario racing alongside Toadette in Mario Circuit 1 from Super Mario Kart

Mario Kart Tour deviated from the traditional gameplay of the Mario Kart series, where the objective is to reach the finish line in first; this game utilized a point-based system. There were four options of speed: 50cc (namely "leisurely"), 100cc ("fast"), 150cc ("very fast") and 200cc ("too fast"; only available to Gold Pass owners, which was a subscription purchasable in the game). Unlike previous installments in the series, much of the driving (notably acceleration, jump boosts) was performed automatically. Mario Kart Tour included features from previous Mario Kart games, such as underwater racing and hang gliding from Mario Kart 7. This game introduced a new Frenzy mode, which occurred when a driver got three identical items from an item box, allowing them to repeatedly use the item for a short period. Each character could get a unique item (also known as "Special Skill") from item boxes.

The game introduced a new format called "Tours", which were named after cities in the real world, Mario series characters, Mario series games, or other themes. Each tour lasted for two weeks, beginning on Wednesday at 1:00 a.m. EST. In a tour, players could compete in twelve to eighteen cups and collect drivers, karts and gliders which represent the corresponding cities or themes. There were also spotlight drivers, karts, and gliders while a tour lasted for two weeks. Each Cup consisted of three courses (some courses that were based on the ones from Super Mario Kart were labelled as "remix courses" (abbreviated to "RMX courses") and used a different layout compared to the original, and featured new mechanics) and a bonus challenge. Some courses from previous cups were reused for subsequent cups. Most races had two laps instead of three in previous installments, while most bonus challenges were done in one lap. The cups were also named after some of the drivers in the game instead of the usual items in the Mario franchise, similar to the Mario Kart Arcade GP series.

After the player finished a race, the player was awarded Grand Stars to unlock tour gifts, coins and experience points for the used character, kart, and glider. If the player finished in the top three, they would earn some player points for their level. If the player finished in 5th place or below, the level-gauge would decrease. When the player filled the gauge all the way, they would level-up to get a reward. Each course also had an experience point limit. The max player-level was 400.

Each week, a tour's cup was a tournament. Twenty players were placed on a leaderboard based on the overall score for the cup. By the following Wednesday, Lakitu announced how well the player did. The player would increase in tier, and earn some rewards if their final position was near the top, but they would lose one or two tiers if they finished poorly. The player also got a reward if they and their friends' score reached a certain amount.

The game included races against bots with usernames of real players, designed to give players the impression of playing against other humans. In addition, a beta test for the multiplayer function of this game began from "approximately 2:00 p.m. EST on December 19, 2019 to 12:59 p.m. EST on December 27, 2019" and was only available for subscribers to the Gold Pass. From January 23, 2020, to January 29, 2020, there was a multiplayer test for all players of the game.

On March 8, 2020, multiplayer function in Mario Kart Tour was officially launched. All players could "race against up to seven other players, whether they're registered as in-game friends, nearby to your location, or even scattered around the world." In the meantime, "Gold Races are available exclusively to subscribers of the Mario Kart Tour Gold Pass." One of the main differences between the Standard Races (for players without the Gold Pass) and the Gold Races was the selection of speed: only 100cc was available in the Standard Races while 150cc and 200cc were available in the Gold Races. There was a multiplayer rank (ranging from F to A, S to S+9 if subscribed to the Gold Pass) for each player. A percentage for the rank would increase when a player won in a multiplayer race, but would decrease or remain unchanged during a loss.

The game originally could only be played in portrait mode; however, on July 21, 2020, an update was released that added support for landscape mode and a new control layout. An update in March 2022 added support for Miis as playable racers.

== Development ==
In January 2018, Nintendo announced a mobile version of the Mario Kart series for iOS and Android. Nintendo announced in April 2019 that they would be holding a closed beta for the game, exclusively for Android users, which took place from late May to early June. Initially expected to be released by March 2019, the game was released on September 25, 2019. The game was downloaded ten million times by the day after its release.

To celebrate the Super Mario Bros. 35th Anniversary, the game was updated to include two new characters: SNES Mario and Donkey Kong Jr., who had not appeared in the series since Super Mario Kart.

On September 2, 2022, Nintendo announced that the game's most controversial element—the "gacha" mechanic with the ruby spotlight pipe—would be removed and replaced in an October update with a normal shop that would include any new tours' brand new characters, gliders, and karts. Collectibles from previous tours would also be brought back to give players another chance to obtain them. The update also introduced Battle Mode.

Nintendo ceased new content for the game on October 4, 2023, instead choosing to rerun previous events and tours. Despite the announcement that there would no longer be any new content, the 2025 rerun of the Sunshine Tour included a bit of new content, to celebrate the release of World. Nintendo stated that no new drivers or karts would be added after the bonus content.

On February 9, 2022, Nintendo announced that several of the game's original tracks would be bundled as DLC tracks for Mario Kart 8 Deluxe for the Nintendo Switch as part of the "Booster Course Pass". Some of this content returned for the series' next entry, Mario Kart World for the Nintendo Switch 2.

=== Shutdown ===
On July 8, 2026, Nintendo announced that Mario Kart Tour would shut down on September 30, 2026 at 06:00 UTC. Nintendo also clarified that unlike with Animal Crossing: Pocket Camp, no offline version would be offered after the game was shut down. In-app purchases and subscription renewals for the Gold Pass ended on the day of the announcement. All players were given access to Gold Pass benefits from August 4, 2026 until the shutdown date.

== Reception ==
Reception

Aggregate score
Aggregator	Score
Metacritic	59/100

Review scores
Publication	Score
4Players	42/100
Destructoid	4.5/10
GameRevolution	3.5/5
Gamezebo	4.5/5
IGN	6.7/10
Jeuxvideo.com	11/20
Nintendo Life	7/10
Pocket Gamer	3.5/5

Mario Kart Tour received "mixed or average reviews" according to review aggregator website Metacritic. While critics praised the graphics and simple controls, they criticized Mario Kart Tour's gacha element, as well as its monthly $4.99 Gold Pass feature, which is required to use the game's 200cc feature, to get more items and in-game achievements, the constant need for a stable internet connection, and the only way to unlock things like karts and gold badges in the game requires money. Many journalists noted that the monthly charge for the subscription service was the same as that of Apple Arcade, which launched a few days prior to the release of Mario Kart Tour, claiming that the former provides subscribers with more content for the same price and thus, is a better value. The game was also criticized for player selection multiplayer functionality and not having characters at launch like Luigi who had been available in trailers, tutorials and the beta testing stage of the game.

=== Commercial performance ===
On its first day, Mario Kart Tour was available for download in 58 markets, including the Japanese and American markets. Revenue-wise, it placed #19 for iPhone apps in the United States. This was a significant debut improvement compared to Dr. Mario World, a match-three mobile game also developed by Nintendo and released on July 9, 2019, which placed #503 during its debut. Another game published by Nintendo on February 2, 2017, Fire Emblem Heroes, placed #17 on the top iPhone revenue app during its debut.

Mario Kart Tour received 90.1 million downloads in its first week of availability according to Sensor Tower, the highest number of first-week downloads for a Nintendo mobile game, surpassing Animal Crossing: Pocket Camp's 14.3 million downloads. It also made $12.7 million in first-week player spending, the 3rd-highest for a Nintendo mobile game behind Fire Emblem Heroes ($28.2 million) and Super Mario Run ($16.1 million). Total downloads reached 123.9 million in the first month of release, generating $37.4 million in player spending. In April 2021, Sensor Tower released additional information about Mario Kart Tour surpassing 200 million downloads and $200 million for revenue, making it the second biggest mobile game in revenue for Nintendo, only behind Fire Emblem Heroes.

=== Accolades ===
Mario Kart Tour won the award for "Racing Game of the Year" at the 23rd Annual D.I.C.E. Awards, and was nominated for "Favorite Video Game" at the 2020 Kids' Choice Awards.

== Lootbox lawsuit ==
On May 17, 2023, a young boy assisted by his father filed a lawsuit against Nintendo for alleging one of Mario Kart Tour's previously implemented gacha mechanisms, or lootboxes, named 'Spotlight Pipes', "capitalized on and encouraged addictive behaviors akin to gambling," and called for all minors in the United States who were involved in purchasing in such lootboxes to receive a refund, after the young boy reportedly spent $170 in Mario Kart Tour microtransactions using his father's credit card.

Prior to its removal in 2022, the gacha mechanism allowed players to receive random in-game items and upgrades in return for buying the in-game currency of 'Rubies' and spending them at the 'Spotlight Pipes'. The suit also alleges that Nintendo intentionally made the game more difficult to progress without purchasing such microtransactions and that it "tricked players" into doing so. These actions go against California's Business law and Washington State's Consumer Protection Act.
