= Mario Kart 8 =

2014 video game

- Wii U cover art
- Developers: Nintendo EAD (Note: Additional work by Bandai Namco Studios); Nintendo EPD (Note: Deluxe only)
- Publisher: Nintendo
- Directors: Kosuke Yabuki; Yusuke Shiraiwa
- Producers: Hideki Konno; Yasuyuki Oyagi; Kosuke Yabuki
- Programmer: Yusuke Shiraiwa
- Artists: Masaaki Ishikawa; Masahiro Kawanishi
- Composers: Shiho Fujii; Atsuko Asahi; Ryō Nagamatsu; Yasuaki Iwata; Kenta Nagata
- Series: Mario Kart
- Platforms: Wii U; Nintendo Switch
- Release: Wii U: JP: May 29, 2014; NA/EU: May 30, 2014; AU: May 31, 2014; Nintendo Switch: WW: April 28, 2017; CHN: March 16, 2020
- Genre: Kart racing
- Modes: Single-player, multiplayer

Mario Kart 8 (Note: Japanese: マリオカート8, Hepburn: Mario Kāto Eito) is a 2014 kart racing game developed and published by Nintendo for the Wii U. It retains the gameplay of previous Mario Kart games, with players controlling characters from the Mario series and other Nintendo characters in races around tracks. Tracks are themed around locales from the Super Mario series populated with power-ups that help players gain advantages in races. Different difficulties are selectable prior to a race; harder difficulties make gameplay faster. In the new anti-gravity sequences, players drive on walls and ceilings. Mario Kart 8 contains a variety of single-player and local and online multiplayer game modes, including Grand Prix racing and arena-based battle modes.

Nintendo revealed Mario Kart 8 in 2013 and released it in May 2014. Both paid and free downloadable content (DLC) was released after its launch, including additional tracks and a new difficulty setting. It was re-released on the Nintendo Switch in April 2017 as Mario Kart 8 Deluxe, (Note: Japanese: マリオカート8 デラックス, Hepburn: Mario Kāto Eito Derakkusu) including the DLC, a revamped battle mode and other gameplay alterations. From March 2022 until November 2023, Deluxe received additional DLC, Booster Course Pass, which added 48 race tracks and eight characters.

Mario Kart 8 was a critical success; reviewers praised its gameplay and presentation, but the battle mode was criticized. Critics praised Deluxe as the definitive version for its improved battle modes and presentation. Both releases have been named by critics as among the best Mario Kart games, have won and been nominated for several awards, and have named among the greatest video games.

Mario Kart 8 is one of the best-selling video games, at over 79.54 million sold for both versions combined. The original version is also the best-selling Wii U game at 8.46 million sold and Deluxe is the best-selling Nintendo Switch game at 71.08 million. A sequel, Mario Kart World, was released as a launch title for the Nintendo Switch 2 in 2025.

== Gameplay ==
Anti-gravity racing was introduced in Mario Kart 8.

Mario Kart 8 is a kart racing game in which players control characters from the Mario universe, The Legend of Zelda, Animal Crossing, Splatoon (Mario Kart 8 Deluxe), or the players' Miis, to race in go-karts around a course. They may hinder their opponents or improve their performance using power-ups found in item boxes throughout the course. It includes five different difficulties, which can be selected before a race: 50cc, 100cc, 150cc, Mirror Mode, and 200cc (added in a post-launch update). Mirror Mode horizontally inverts all courses in 150cc mode. Returning features from previous installments include motorbikes and 12-player racing from Mario Kart Wii, and hang gliders, underwater racing, and vehicle customization from Mario Kart 7. Up to four players can play together on a single system (eight in a Nintendo Switch 2 update for Deluxe), up to eight can play together through a local wireless connection (Switch only), and up to twelve can play together via online multiplayer.

The signature new feature of Mario Kart 8 is anti-gravity racing, in which certain parts of a course allow racers to drive on walls and ceilings. In these sections, players who collide with other racers or special bumpers trigger speed boosts. New characters include the Koopalings and Pink Gold Peach. The vehicles include karts, motorbikes and all-terrain vehicles. There are four new items: the Boomerang Flower, which can be used to throw boomerangs that attack racers; the Piranha Plant, which attacks nearby racers and obstacles and provides a speed boost; the Crazy Eight, which gives the user eight different items at once; and the Super Horn, which can be used both to attack nearby opponents and defend against items, including the previously nearly unavoidable Spiny Shell. The 32 courses are spread across eight cups, with an additional 16 courses released as downloadable content (DLC) in four additional cups.

=== Mario Kart 8 Deluxe ===
Mario Kart 8 Deluxe for the Nintendo Switch includes all downloadable content (DLC) for the Wii U version of Mario Kart 8, including characters, courses, and vehicle components. These features do not need to be unlocked. In addition to previous DLC, several new characters were introduced in Deluxe, including the Inklings from Splatoon, Bowser Jr., Dry Bones, and King Boo. Characters from third-party franchises, including Sonic the Hedgehog, Mega Man and Pac-Man, are present as costumes for the Mii character unlocked by scanning Amiibo, in addition to those based on Nintendo characters. Other changes include the ability to hold two items at once, and accessibility features to assist newer players, such as auto-acceleration or smart steering, which prevents players from veering off course. Deluxe also reintroduces the Boo item, which allows the player to temporarily become invisible and steal an opponent's item, and in Battle, reintroduces the Feather, which allows the player to jump higher. In Deluxe's "Booster Course Pass", several courses have differing layouts in every lap, condensing multiple variations of a course into one.

In Renegade Roundup, the authority player Bowser Jr. (left), using a Piranha Plant, aims to capture Isabelle (right), who is trying to free her captured renegade teammates from a cage by driving over a jail switch.

The largest addition to Mario Kart 8 Deluxe is the updated battle mode. Deluxe includes five new battle mode-exclusive courses and three battle courses adapted from previous entries in the Mario Kart series. These battle courses are designed specifically for the mode, featuring layouts that allow for easier item play, rather than repurposing standard race courses like Mario Kart 8. The Feather item, reintroduced from previous entries in the series, is exclusive to this mode and allows the player to get a small boost in height when it is activated. There are five rulesets in battle mode. In Balloon Battle, players use items to destroy each other's balloons. Unlike in previous incarnations, the mode is point-based rather than last-man-standing, meaning that the winner is whoever destroys the most balloons before the match ends. Bob-omb Blast is a variation of Balloon Battle with all the items replaced with Bob-ombs. In Shine Thief, players must maintain control of a Shine Sprite for as long as possible; the player or team who possesses it for the longest wins. In Coin Runners, players scavenge coins from around the course and steal them from other players, aiming to have the biggest hoard. The final mode is Renegade Roundup, which involves a team of "renegades" trying to avoid the "authorities" armed with Piranha Plants, which takes inspiration from the children's game "cops and robbers". Renegades may free their captured teammates by driving over switches under the cages controlled by the authorities.

== Development and release ==
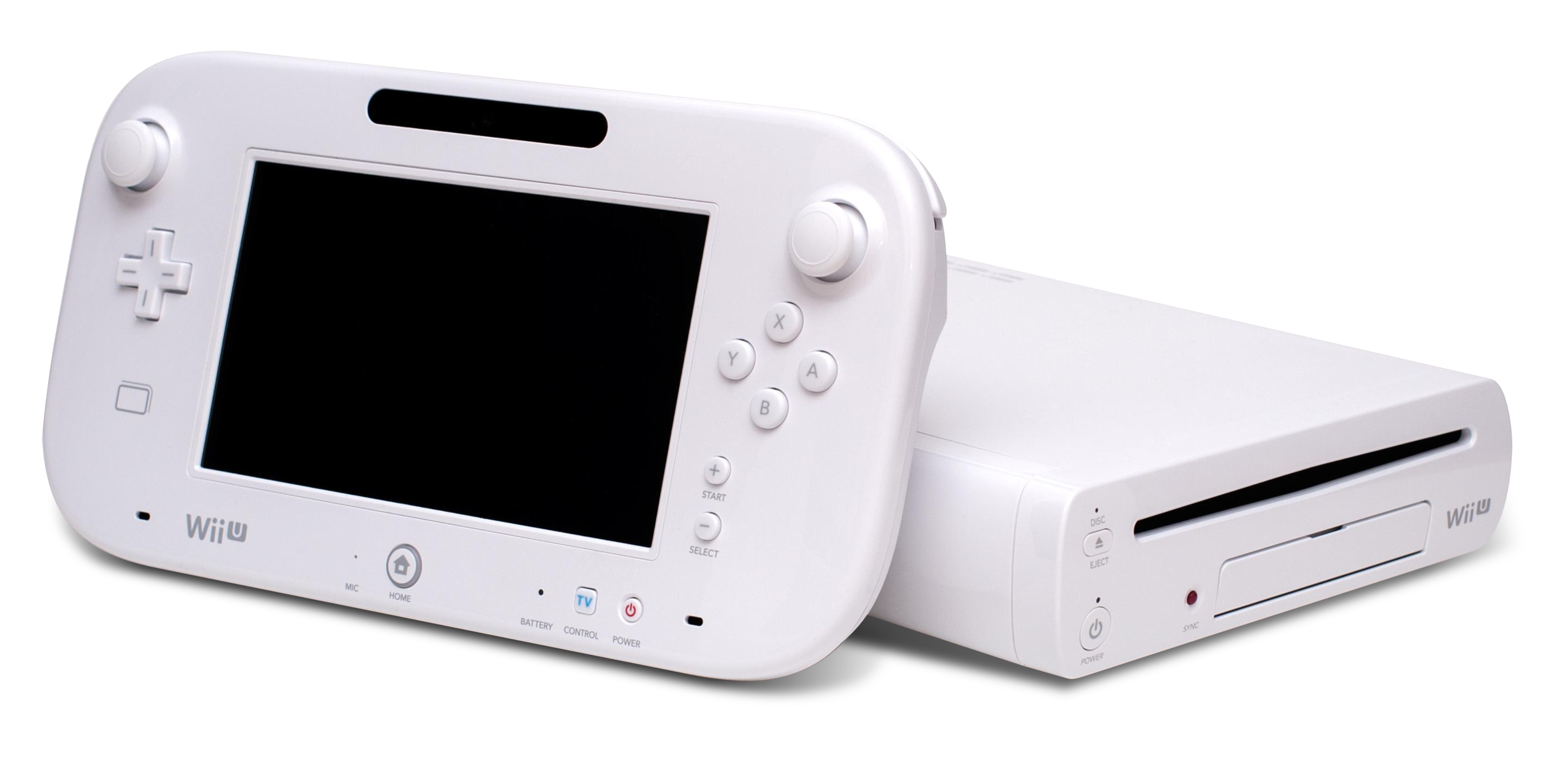
Mario Kart 8 was originally released for the Wii U.

Nintendo confirmed Mario Kart 8 in a January 2013 Nintendo Direct presentation and unveiled it at E3 2013. Some members of Bandai Namco Games received special thanks in the credits. The "8" in the logo was designed to resemble a Möbius strip, as was Mario Circuit, one of the courses. Early in development, the idea of using a drill to penetrate the ground was considered but discarded as less interesting than anti-gravity. Courses were designed with anti-gravity in mind, and tracks from older games were redesigned to use it. Other courses had gliding and underwater sections added.

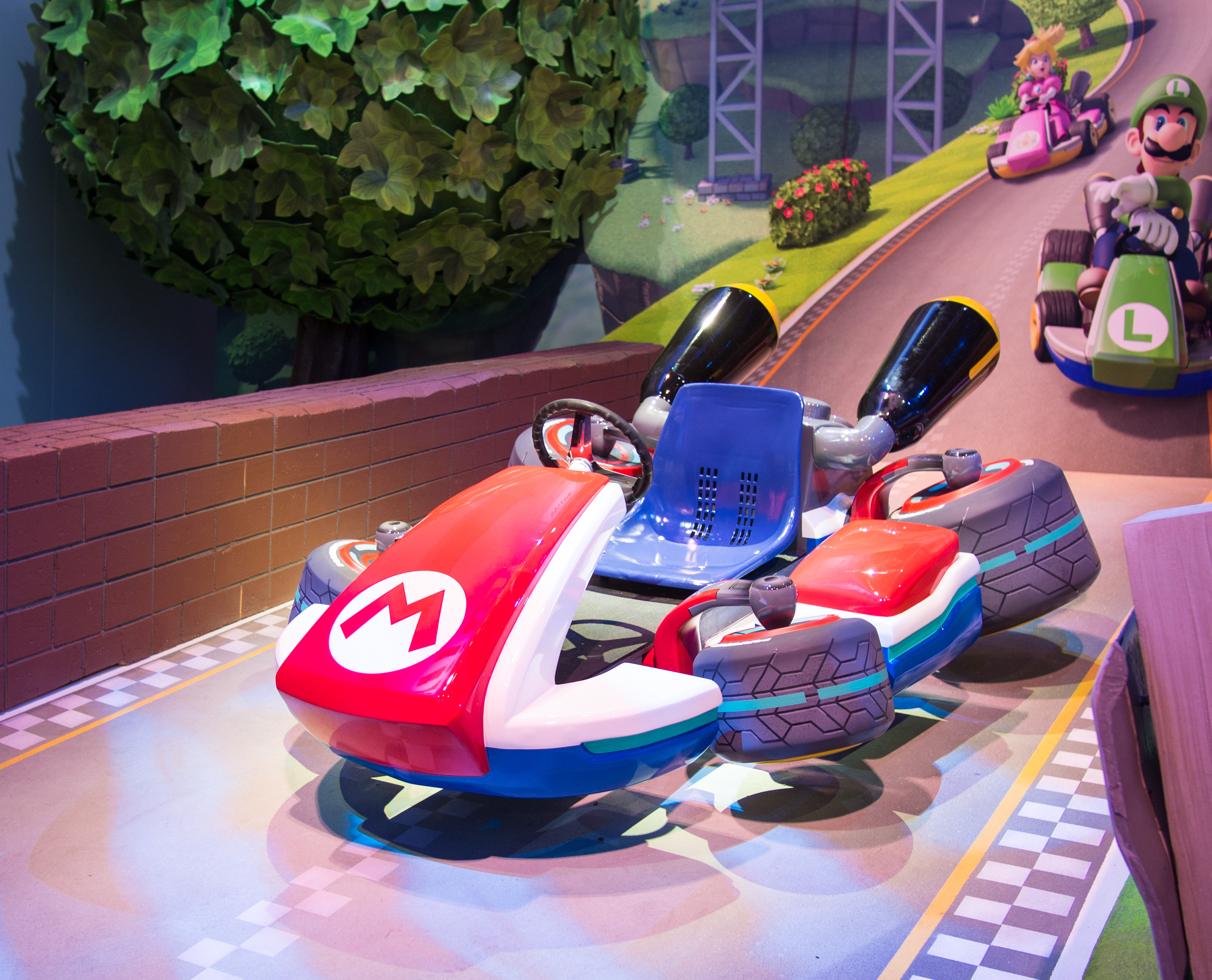
A replica of the standard kart from Mario Kart 8 at E3 2013

Nintendo's launch promotions of Mario Kart 8 include a limited edition with a spiny shell figurine and themed console bundles, with a hat, strategy guide, Wii Remote Plus controller, Wii Wheel, and GamePad protector. In North America, Europe, and Australia, players who purchased and registered Mario Kart 8 on Club Nintendo before July 31, 2014, received a download code for a selected Wii U game. As part of a promotional campaign with Mercedes-Benz, Mario, Luigi, and Peach were featured in a series of Japanese commercials for the Mercedes-Benz GLA, and three karts based on past and present Mercedes-Benz vehicles were added as part of a downloadable update on August 27, 2014. In 2014, the fast food company McDonald's released Happy Meal-branded toys based on the characters and karts. An album containing 68 tracks was made available as an exclusive reward available to Club Nintendo members shortly before the service was discontinued in 2015.

Game updates added features and user experience improvements, such as support for Amiibo figurines, a 200cc difficulty setting, player statistics, and additional Mii outfits. Two paid DLC packs added characters, vehicles, and courses. Some characters and courses are based on other Nintendo franchises, including Link (The Legend of Zelda), Isabelle and Villager (Animal Crossing), Mute City and Big Blue (F-Zero), and Excitebike Arena (Excitebike). Downloadable content for Mario Kart 8 is no longer available to purchase due to the discontinuation of the Nintendo eShop for Wii U.

In March 2023, Nintendo halted online play for Mario Kart 8 and Splatoon due to a security vulnerability. The problem was fixed with an update, and online play resumed on August 3. Online services for Wii U, including Mario Kart 8 online play, were terminated on April 9, 2024.

=== Mario Kart 8 Deluxe ===
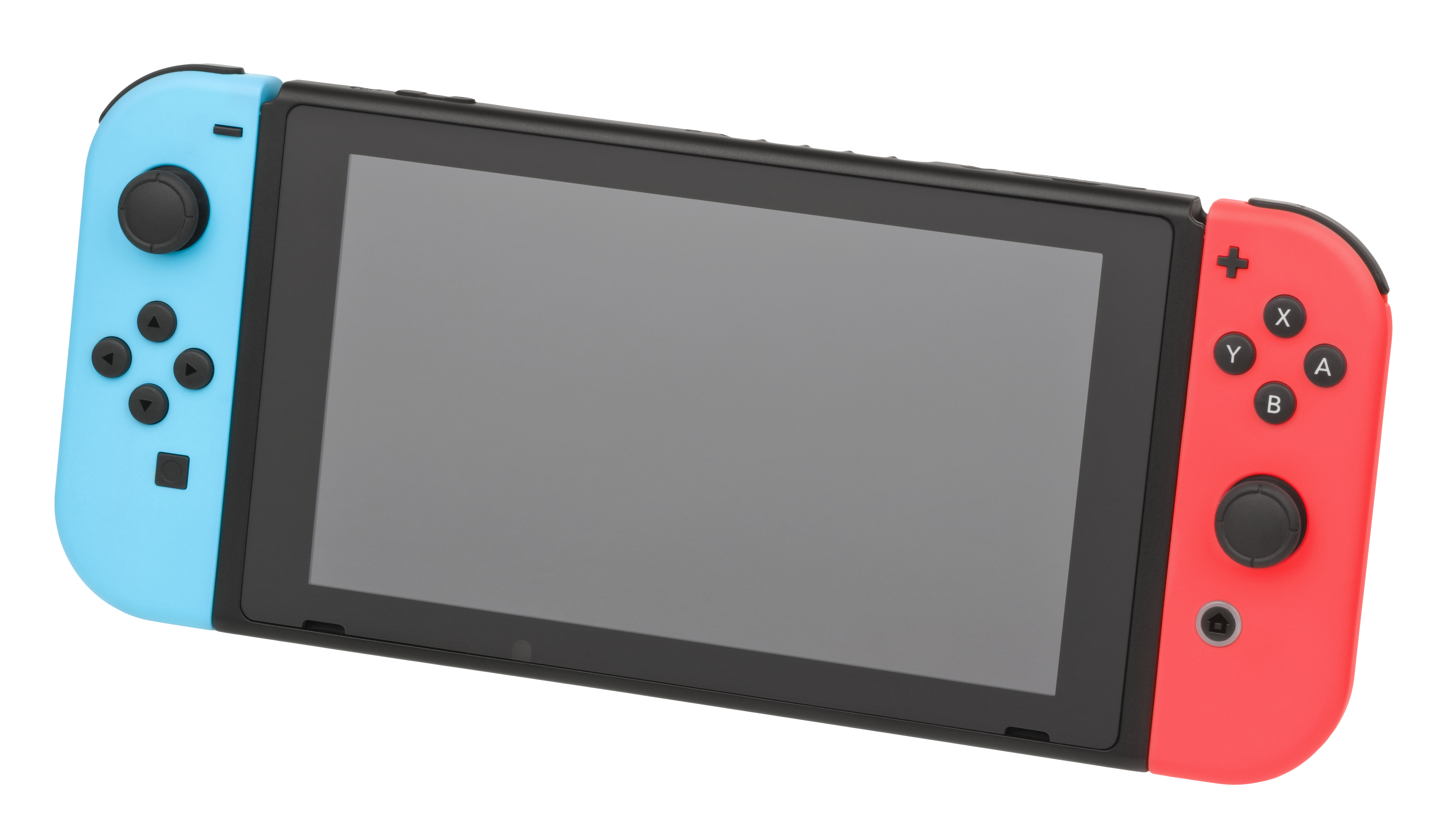
Mario Kart 8 Deluxe was announced alongside and exclusively released for the Nintendo Switch.

Nintendo teased Mario Kart 8 Deluxe with the announcement of the Nintendo Switch in October 2016, and revealed it at the Nintendo Switch presentation on January 12, 2017. The trailer showcased mechanics such as smart steering and crossover elements from the Splatoon series. Additional crossovers with The Legend of Zelda: Breath of the Wild were added in an update after launch. Deluxe was released on April 28, 2017, following the Switch's March 3 launch. Nintendo also announced a steering wheel accessory for the Switch Joy-Con controller to allow for motion-controlled steering. An overview trailer revealed details about the battle mode including several battle mode-exclusive courses, and the return of the Shine Thief mode from Mario Kart: Double Dash. After the release of the trailer, several internet memes circulated surrounding Donkey Kong appearing to perform a celebratory dab. Mario Kart 8 Deluxe revamps the battle mode, adds a second item slot, among other minor gameplay improvements.

Shortly after launch, Nintendo released a software update that changed one of the victory gestures done by the Inkling Girl. Prior to the update, the Inkling Girl performed a gesture that consisted of placing her hand on a flexed bicep and pumping her fist into the air. In Japan, the gesture means something similar to "bring it on!", though in European and Latin American countries, it was likened to the bras d'honneur, an offensive gesture that can be interpreted as "up your ass", "fuck you", or similar meanings. After the update, the Inkling Girl no longer clenches her fist around her flexed arm, instead simply performing a "fist pump", though the rest of the gesture was unchanged.

A series of updates in 2018 added compatibility with Nintendo Labo, a toys-to-life kit that uses cardboard to create motion-controlled toys with Joy-Con controllers. The first update enabled the Toy-Con Motorbike as a controller for Mario Kart 8 Deluxe, allowing the player to use the physical throttle, handlebars, and gyroscope present on the Toy-Con Motorbike, while actions like braking, drifting, and item pickups are still performed using the standard controller buttons. A later update added compatibility for the Toy-Con Car, Pedal, and Key to control actions like braking, drifting, and using the horn on the steering wheel to launch items. An update released on December 7, 2022, added an item customization option for certain modes, allowing players to choose which items are obtainable in a race or Battle. In September 2026, an update was released which includes enhanced visuals and eight-player local multiplayer on the Nintendo Switch 2 console.

==== Booster Course Pass ====
During a February 2022 Nintendo Direct, it was announced that Mario Kart 8 Deluxe would get a paid downloadable content season pass called the "Booster Course Pass". Courses in the "Booster Course Pass" are largely remastered from their incarnations in previous Mario Kart games. The "Booster Course Pass" was released in six waves, with each wave containing eight courses split into two cups, totaling to 48 additional tracks that were released between March 2022 and November 2023. It can be accessed by purchasing it on the Nintendo Switch's eShop, or by having an active Nintendo Switch Online + Expansion Pack subscription. The first wave of the "Booster Course Pass" was released on March 18, 2022, containing the Golden Dash Cup and the Lucky Cat Cup. Wave 2 was released on August 4, 2022, containing the Turnip Cup and the Propeller Cup. It also featured Sky-High Sundae, an original course not introduced in a previous Mario Kart game. Alongside the release of Wave 2, Nintendo released an update to the Wave 1 course Wii Coconut Mall that changed the cars at the end of the course to perform donuts, rather than remaining stationary, except for in Time Trials. This change was widely praised, especially after many were disappointed that the cars were stationary in the "Booster Course Pass" to begin with. (Note: Supported by multiple sources:) Wave 3 was released on December 7, 2022, containing the Rock Cup and the Moon Cup. The ability to remove certain items from "VS Race" mode and online races was also added. Wave 4 was released on March 8, 2023, in North America and March 9 elsewhere, containing the Fruit Cup and the Boomerang Cup. It also featured a brand new original course based on Yoshi's Island (1995). Wave 5 was released on July 12, 2023, containing the Feather Cup and the Cherry Cup. It also featured a brand new course, Squeaky Clean Sprint. The final wave, Wave 6 was shown off in a Nintendo Direct on September 14, 2023, and released on November 9, 2023, containing the Acorn Cup and the Spiny Cup. Wave 6 adds a music player featuring music from all courses, and 18 additional costumes for the Mii racers.

Starting in February 2023, Nintendo added eight more playable characters, all having previously appeared in other Mario Kart games. The first of these characters, Birdo, debuted in Wave 4; Petey Piranha, Wiggler, and Kamek in Wave 5; and Diddy Kong, Funky Kong, Pauline and Peachette in Wave 6.

== Reception and legacy ==
Reception

Aggregate scores
Aggregator	Score	
Aggregator	NS	Wii U
Metacritic	92/100 (Note: Score based on 95 reviews)	88/100 (Note: Score based on 82 reviews)
OpenCritic	99% recommend 72% recommend(Booster Course Pass) (Note: Based on 44 reviews.)	88% recommend

Review scores
Publication	Score	
Publication	NS	Wii U
Destructoid	9.5/10	9/10
Easy Allies	4.5/5	N/A
Electronic Gaming Monthly	4/5	3/5
Eurogamer	Essential	10/10
Game Informer	9.25/10	9.25/10
GameRevolution	4/5	5/5
GameSpot	9/10	8/10
GamesRadar+	5/5	4/5
GamesTM	9/10	9/10
Giant Bomb	N/A	4/5
Hardcore Gamer	4.5/5	4.5/5
IGN	9.3/10	9/10
Nintendo Life	10/10	9/10
Pocket Gamer	4.5/5	N/A
Shacknews	9/10	8/10
The Guardian	5/5	5/5
USgamer	5/5	4.5/5
VentureBeat	90/100	85/100

Mario Kart 8 received "generally favorable" reviews, according to review aggregator website Metacritic, whereas Deluxe received "universal acclaim". Overall, reviewers held Mario Kart 8 in high esteem among racing games, (Note: Supported by multiple sources:) but considered Deluxe the definitive version. (Note: Supported by multiple sources:) Deluxe was called one of the best games in the Mario Kart series or one of the best racing games of all time. (Note: Supported by multiple sources:) Some reviewers considered it an essential purchase for Nintendo Switch owners. Improvements in Deluxe made certain features of Mario Kart 8 feel worse in retrospect. However, many reviewers criticized the initial lack of new content in Deluxe compared to Mario Kart 8. (Note: Supported by multiple sources:)

The main racing mode was widely praised. Eurogamer called it the "most vibrant home console racing game in years". The rubber-banding mechanics were criticized, though Game Informer said that "fans accepted that pitfall as a series mainstay long ago". Finding the core racing unchanged, they said Deluxe is still "the same great title from the Wii U". GameSpot and Nintendo Life also considered Deluxe's racing to be as strong as the original. Minor mechanical changes, such as the ability to hold two items, were praised, with many liking how it added more strategy to Deluxe's item play. (Note: Supported by multiple sources:) Accessibility options like smart steering and auto-acceleration received mixed feedback. Many felt that the additions made Deluxe the most accessible Mario Kart game, and others appreciated how they helped less experienced players enjoy the game, though making it too easy for veteran players. (Note: Supported by multiple sources:) However, some reviewers disliked how smart steering was enabled by default, and how it could overcorrect or interfere with precision inputs.

The main criticism levied at Mario Kart 8 was its battle mode, which was less well received than previous entries. Easy Allies called it "abysmal", and Kotaku said it was "borderline unplayable". Giant Bomb panned the use of repurposed race courses for battle mode in lieu of dedicated battle courses like previous entries, which made it difficult to find opponents to engage with. By contrast, Deluxe's revamped battle mode received widespread acclaim. Easy Allies and Kotaku claimed that the new battle mode far outshined the original game, and Pocket Gamer said that Deluxe returned battle mode to its "original arena-battling glory". VentureBeat said that they remedied the issue with the original Mario Kart 8's battle courses. However, Electronic Gaming Monthly said that the battle mode was "not so much a point for Deluxe that these modes are included as it is a retroactive demerit for the original Mario Kart 8". Many critics considered Renegade Roundup to be the best of Deluxe's battle modes, (Note: Supported by multiple sources:) though GameRevolution and USgamer said it was their least favorite.

Reviewers also focused on the visual style. Eurogamer praised both the vast sense of scale and the "exquisite details" of the courses. Digital Foundry deemed it "near perfection" with "phenomenal attention to detail", featuring a "magnificent visual package" and "magical playability". Their technical analysis attributes the smoothness of motion and overall gameplay to the consistent performance of 60 frames per second (FPS), with the split-screen mode's effective 30 FPS nonetheless comparing favorably with industry standard. Reviewers for Deluxe echoed this praise, (Note: Supported by multiple sources:) with some saying that the graphics of Deluxe were an upgrade from the Wii U original. GamesTM praised the "incredible" lighting of Deluxe, saying that courses like Rainbow Road and Electrodrome stood out as "fantastic showcases for the Nintendo universe and its creative spirit". IGN felt that the "great art direction" in Mario Kart 8 and Deluxe was "a major reason" for the graphics remaining "gorgeous". Easy Allies called the soundtrack "something special", saying that both original and returning songs were "fantastic and downright catchy". Eurogamer called the soundtrack "outrageously upbeat", and that Deluxe's "defining moment" was the live band rendition of the Super Mario Kart theme.

=== Booster Course Pass ===
Upon announcement, the "Booster Course Pass" received mixed reception from fans. Many disliked that additional content for a previous game was being prioritized over a new entry in the series, citing how it had been nearly eight years since Mario Kart 8 first released on the Wii U. The graphics of the courses in the "Booster Course Pass" were also a point of contention, with some saying that they fell short of the standards set by Deluxe.

The graphical differences between the base game courses (Wii Moo Moo Meadows, left) and the courses in the "Booster Course Pass" (DS Shroom Ridge, a Wave 1 course, right) were a point of contention.

After release, critics were mixed—according to Metacritic, Waves 1 & 5 received "mixed or average reviews", (Note: Score based on 10 reviews) and Waves 2-4 & 6 received "generally favorable reviews". (Note: Score based on 7 reviews) (Note: Score based on 7 reviews) Criticism focused on the graphics, which were lower in detail compared to courses from the main game. Digital Foundry attributed this to the courses being built upon their versions from Mario Kart Tour. On the other hand, many reviewers felt that the courses that originated in Tour were among the best gameplay-wise, (Note: Supported by multiple sources:) and Ninja Hideaway in particular was praised as a highlight of Wave 1. (Note: Supported by multiple sources:) Some courses in Wave 2 were lauded, with Nintendo Life calling Waluigi Pinball's graphics "stunning". Another common criticism was that the earlier courses did not include Mario Kart 8's signature anti-gravity or underwater features. (Note: Supported by multiple sources:) GameSpot lamented how the "Booster Course Pass" initially only introduced new courses, rather than new characters or customization parts. Nintendo Life praised the audio design, calling it "stellar" and "a delight". The addition of courses that vary every lap was praised with Nintendo Life wishing it would become a "mainstay" feature of the series.

=== Accolades ===
Readers and staff of Eurogamer voted Mario Kart 8 their game of the year, and GameSpot gave it the award of "Best Wii U Game". It was nominated for "Best Wii U Exclusive" in GameTrailers' 2014 Game of the Year Awards; for "Best Game" in Giant Bomb's 2014 Game of the Year Awards; and for "Overall Game of the Year" and "Wii U Retail Game of the Year" in Nintendo Life's Reader Awards 2014, and it won both awards for both categories in their Staff Awards 2014. It won "Game of the Year" by The Guardian. In IGN's Best of 2014 Awards, it was nominated for "Best Multiplayer" and "Best Racing", and won the award for "Best Wii U Game".

Mario Kart 8 Deluxe also earned recognition at year-end awards in the 2017–2018 season. It was nominated for "Best Switch Game" and "Best Remake/Remaster" in IGN's Best of 2017 Awards. Destructoid nominated it for its "Best Switch Game" in their Game of the Year Awards in 2017, and it was awarded "Old Game of the Year" at Giant Bomb's 2017 Game of the Year Awards.

List of awards and nominations
Year	Awards	Category	Nominee(s)	Result	Ref.
2014	British Academy Children's Awards	Best Game	Mario Kart 8	Won	
2014	The Game Awards 2014	Best Family Game	Mario Kart 8	Won	
2014	The Game Awards 2014	Best Sports/Racing Game	Mario Kart 8	Won	
2015	18th Annual D.I.C.E. Awards	Racing Game of the Year	Mario Kart 8	Won	
2015	11th British Academy Games Awards	Best Game	Mario Kart 8	Nominated	
2015	11th British Academy Games Awards	Audio Achievement	Mario Kart 8	Nominated	
2015	11th British Academy Games Awards	Family Game	Mario Kart 8	Nominated	
2015	11th British Academy Games Awards	Multiplayer Game	Mario Kart 8	Nominated	
2015	2015 Kids' Choice Awards	Most Addicting Game	Mario Kart 8	Nominated	
2017	Golden Joystick Awards	Studio of the Year	Nintendo EPD	Won	
2017	Golden Joystick Awards	Nintendo Game of the Year	Mario Kart 8 Deluxe	Nominated	
2017	The Game Awards 2017	Best Family Game	Mario Kart 8 Deluxe	Nominated	
2017	The Game Awards 2017	Best Multiplayer	Mario Kart 8 Deluxe	Nominated	
2018	21st Annual D.I.C.E. Awards	Racing Game of the Year	Mario Kart 8 Deluxe	Won	
2018	2018 Kids' Choice Awards	Favorite Video Game	Mario Kart 8 Deluxe	Nominated	

=== Sales ===
In its first four days on sale, Mario Kart 8 became the fastest-selling Wii U game, with more than 1.2 million copies sold worldwide. Within a month, it increased to 2.82 million. As of September 2021, more than 8.46 million copies were sold worldwide, making it the best-selling Wii U game. Based on the sales data, more than half of Wii U owners own a copy. In the United Kingdom, shortly after the release of Mario Kart 8, week-on-week Wii U console sales rose 662%, with Mario Kart 8 bundles accounting for 82% of consoles sold.

Mario Kart 8 Deluxe sold 459,000 copies in the United States on its launch day, making it the fastest-selling entry in the Mario Kart series, ahead of 2008's Mario Kart Wii by 25,000 units. Roughly one year after launch, Deluxe had sold 9.22 million copies. It surpassed Super Mario Odyssey as the best-selling game on the Nintendo Switch in 2019, and Mario Kart Wii as the best-selling Mario Kart game in 2021. Since its release in 2017, Deluxe has been a consistent top-selling game on the Nintendo Switch.As of December 31, 2024, Mario Kart 8 Deluxe has sold 67.35 million units, making it one of the best-selling games of all time.

=== Luigi death stare ===
"Luigi's death stare" is an Internet meme describing the automatic facial expression displayed by Luigi toward other characters upon attacking or passing them during a race, in which he gives them a disapproving glare. It was featured in several viral videos and animated GIFs, and the phenomenon was covered by WNYW in early June 2014. Nintendo referenced the meme in their E3 2014 digital event. VentureBeat praised Nintendo's handling of the meme, noting that it was a "slick way" of acknowledging fan culture. The meme was nominated for the Best Gaming Moment at the 32nd Golden Joystick Awards.
