= Mario Kart =

Video game series by Nintendo

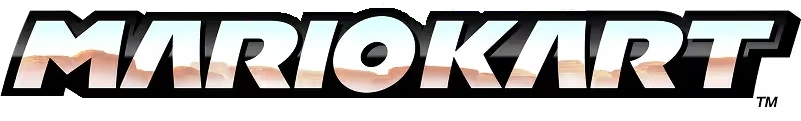
- Logo used since 2025
- Genre: Kart racing
- Developers: Nintendo EAD (1992–2014); Nintendo EPD (2017–present); Intelligent Systems (Super Circuit); Retro Studios (7); Namco (Arcade GP); Namco Bandai Games (Arcade GP); Bandai Namco Studios (Arcade GP); Velan Studios (Home Circuit)
- Publisher: Nintendo
- Creators: Shigeru Miyamoto; Tadashi Sugiyama; Hideki Konno
- Platforms: SNES; Nintendo 64; iQue Player; Game Boy Advance; GameCube; Nintendo DS; Arcade; Wii; Nintendo 3DS; Wii U; Nintendo Switch; iOS; Android; Nintendo Switch 2
- First release: Super Mario Kart; August 27, 1992
- Latest release: Mario Kart World; June 5, 2025
- Spin-offs: Mario Kart Arcade GP; Mario Kart Live: Home Circuit

Mario Kart (Note: Japanese: マリオカート, Hepburn: Mario Kāto) is a series of kart racing games based on the Mario franchise developed and published by Nintendo. Players compete in go-kart races while using various power-up items. It features characters from the Mario series racing along tracks based on Mario universe-locations. Some releases have also included characters from other popular franchises like Pac-Man, Taiko no Tatsujin, The Legend of Zelda, Animal Crossing, and Splatoon.

The series was launched in 1992 with Super Mario Kart on the Super Nintendo Entertainment System (SNES), to critical and commercial success. The Mario Kart series totals seventeen games, with eight on home consoles, three on handheld-only consoles, five arcade games co-developed with Namco, and one for mobile phones. Over 200 million copies of the series have been sold worldwide.

Mario Kart 8, released on the Wii U in 2014 and ported to the Nintendo Switch in 2017, is one of the best-selling video games, at over 79 million copies sold for both versions. Mario Kart Live: Home Circuit, a mixed reality game, was released on the Switch in October 2020. The newest installment, Mario Kart World, was released as a launch game on the Nintendo Switch 2 on June 5, 2025.

== Gameplay ==
A single-player race being played on the "Mario Circuit" course in the Grand Prix mode in Mario Kart 8 Deluxe (2017)

In the Mario Kart series, players compete in go-kart races, controlling one of a selection of Mario characters. Up to 24 characters can compete in each race (varying per game). Players can perform driving techniques during the race such as rocket starts, slipstreaming, drifting and mini-turbos.

Gameplay is enhanced by power-up items obtained by driving into item boxes laid out on the course. These power-ups vary across games in the series, but generally include Mushrooms to give players a speed boost, Red/Green Shells to be thrown at opponents, Banana Peels and hazards such as Fake Item Boxes. The game selects an item based on the player's current position in the race. For example, players lagging far behind may receive more powerful items such as Bullet Bills, which give the player invincibility while auto-piloting them forward at great speed, while the leader of a race may only receive small defensive items, such as Shells or Bananas. This gameplay mechanism allows other racers a realistic chance to catch up to the leading racer. In the original game, Super Mario Kart, the player takes control one of the eight Mario series characters, each with differing capabilities. In single player mode, players can race against computer-controlled characters in 4 multi-race cups consisting of 20 tracks (5 in each cup) over three difficulty levels (50cc, 100cc and 150cc). Alternatively, players can race against the clock in a Time Trial mode. In multiplayer mode, two players can simultaneously take part in the cups or can race against each other one-on-one in Match Race mode. In a third multiplayer mode – Battle Mode – the aim is to defeat the other players by attacking them with power-ups, destroying balloons which surround each kart.

Each new game has introduced new gameplay elements, such as new circuits, items, modes, and playable characters.

- Mario Kart 64 introduced 3D graphics, 4-player racing, mini turbos to more easily execute drift boosts, slipstreaming, and item dangling (the ability to hold bananas and shells to defend against projectiles and hold a reserve item as well), alongside the removal of coins. It introduced several items, including the Fake Item Box, the Golden Mushroom, and the Spiny Shell. In addition to the three Grand Prix engine classes, Extra Mode (known in later games as Mirror Mode) was introduced, in which all tracks are flipped laterally. When playing Battle Mode with three or more players, when a player is defeated they turn into a "Mini Bomb Kart", where they can try and pop another player's balloons.
- Mario Kart: Super Circuit returns to the Mode 7 gameplay style found in Super Mario Kart. Multiplayer in Super Circuit is done via GBA Link Cable. The game allows multiplayer with only one Game Pak, although if played this way the game includes various restrictions, such as a limited course count and players only being allowed to play as Yoshis. Super Circuit introduces a new mode called Free Run, which allows the player to play any course with CPU. Battle mode appears as it did in 64, with Mini Bomb Karts being replaced by Bob-ombs that respawn once exploded.
- Mario Kart: Double Dash!! returns to the 3D format that originated in Mario Kart 64. New feature to the game include double-occupied karts, a 2-player Co-op mode where one player drives while the other uses items, and also LAN play, which allows up to 16 people to play. It introduced a revamped Spiny Shell that leaves an area of effect explosion, and character exclusive items (known in the game as Special Items). It also introduced new alternate battle modes: "Shine Thief", where players fight over obtaining a Shine Sprite from Super Mario Sunshine (2002) before a timer runs out, and "Bob-omb Blast" where players throw Bob-ombs to collect or steal points from each other. In Balloon battle, players no longer turn into Bob-ombs when defeated.
- Mario Kart DS featured dual-screen play to take advantage of the system's capabilities. It introduced custom emblems, as well as Online play via the now defunct Nintendo Wi-Fi Connection, a mission mode, the Bullet Bill and Blooper items, and returning courses as a main feature. It also returned to the single item and racer format. New playable characters included Dry Bones, R.O.B., and Shy Guy (who was exclusive to DS Download Play). It also introduced a new battle mode in "Shine Runners" (not to be confused with the aforementioned "Shine Thief") where players try to collect enough Shine Sprites before a timer runs out to avoid being eliminated.
- Mario Kart Wii introduced motion controls as a headlining new feature alongside the Wii Wheel accessory. It also introduced the ability to perform mid-air tricks, and bikes as a second vehicle type. The amount of racers that could be in a race was raised from 8 to 12. It introduced three new items: the Mega Mushroom, the Thundercloud, and the POW Block. It also introduced a new battle mode titled "Coin Runners" (not to be confused with "Shine Runners"), where players try to collect as many coins as they can before time runs up. The rules of Balloon Battle are now changed, with the focus now being on getting points by popping other player's balloons before a time limit expires, with players now respawning once they run out of balloons.
- Mario Kart 7 featured stereoscopic 3D graphics and the return of dual screen functionality. It introduced gliders and submersible karts, a first-person perspective, and full kart customization. It also re-introduced Coins in regular races for a small speed boost, though they are also now used to unlock kart parts.
- Mario Kart 8 introduced the 200cc engine class, (Note: Added via a post-launch update on April 23, 2015) anti-gravity racing, a third vehicle type in ATVs, downloadable content, HD graphics, and Mii costumes unlocked via amiibo. Also introduced is Mario Kart TV (abbreviated as MKTV), a mode that gives players the ability to save up to six video replays of races. These replays can be customized based on length and various aspects of focus. MKTV was able to upload replays on to YouTube via the now defunct social media platform Miiverse. Battle mode only features balloon battle, with it taking place on a handful of race courses.
- Mario Kart 8 Deluxe added a revamped battle mode, which included the new "Renegade Roundup". Overall gameplay additions include the reintroduction of having two item slots (absent from the series since Double Dash), a third tier of mini-turbo, and added the returning Boo and Feather items (the latter being exclusive to battle mode). It also added 6 characters that were absent from the original game, including King Boo, Dry Bones, Gold Mario, Bowser Jr., and the male and female Inklings from Splatoon, in addition to giving the female Villager her own character slot. From 2022 to the end of 2023, the "Booster Course Pass" DLC expansion pack doubled the amount of courses in the game. It also added new characters, the ability to customize items in VS mode, and a music player.
- Mario Kart Tour was the first Mario Kart title on mobile devices, and introduced a points-based system for certain racing actions. It introduced Frenzy Mode, gacha, and loot box mechanics that were later removed in 2022. It reintroduced character-specific items and new items such as Ice Flower, Coin Box, and Dash Ring. Multiple new tracks were introduced in this game and later added to Mario Kart 8 Deluxe via the DLC Booster Course Pass.
- Mario Kart World features 24-player races and off-roading mechanics, as well as an open-world driving format. A new mode is introduced, called "Knockout Tour", where 24 players will race between 6 different checkpoints located on the open world, with the last 4 players being eliminated each time a checkpoint is passed. Most of the new characters in World have previously appeared as course hazards. Missions from DS return in the form of P-Switches found around the open world. As of its launch, World does not include a 200cc speed option. It is expected to be added in a future update.

=== Modes ===
Each game has a variety of modes. The following five modes recur most often in the series:

- Grand Prix – Players compete in various "cups" of four courses each (five in Super Mario Kart) with difficulty levels based on the size of the engine, larger engines meaning faster speeds. Before Mario Kart 8 there were four difficulties: 50cc, 100cc, 150cc, and Mirror Mode, where all tracks were flipped horizontally. In Mario Kart 8, a fifth difficulty level, 200cc, was added. Players earn points according to their finishing position in each race and the placement order gets carried over to the next race as the new starting grid. At the end of the cup, the top three players with the most points overall will receive a trophy in bronze, silver, and gold. In Mario Kart: Super Circuit and every game from Mario Kart DS onward, players are also ranked based on how well they raced (three to one stars, A, B, C, D, and E). Three stars is the best rank, while E is the worst.
- Time Trials – The player races alone in order to finish any course in the fastest time possible. The best time is then saved as a ghost, which the player can race against in later trials. Mario Kart: Double Dash!! introduced Staff Ghosts, which are ghosts set by members of the Nintendo development team.
- VS Race – Multiple human players race on any course with customized rules such as team racing and item frequency.
- Battle – Multiple human players use in-game offensive items (shells, etc.) to battle each other in a closed arena. In the most common battle type, balloon battle, each player starts with three balloons and loses one per hit; the last player with at least one balloon wins. Various battle types have been added to the series, and single-player battles with CPU controlled players.
- Online Multiplayer – Players compete in races and battles through online services, such as Nintendo Wi-Fi Connection, Nintendo Network, and Nintendo Switch Online. Players can share Time Trial ghosts, and participate in tournaments. In races and battles, players are matched by VR (VS Rating) and BR (Battle Rating) respectively, which is a number between 0 and 99,999 (9,999 in Mario Kart Wii). Players gain or lose points based on performance in a race or battle. The game attempts to match players with a similar rating.
- Knockout Tour – Introduced in Mario Kart World, Knockout Tour presents players the challenge of finishing a race above a specific placement. If players are unable to meet said placement, they are "knocked out", or have failed the tournament.

== History ==
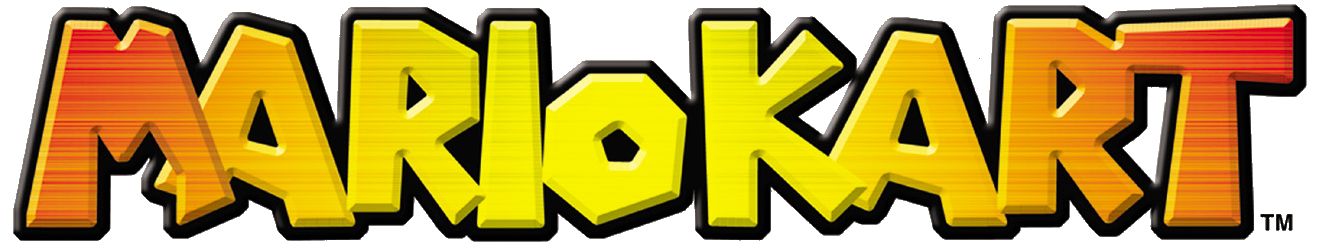
The first series logo, used until Mario Kart DS

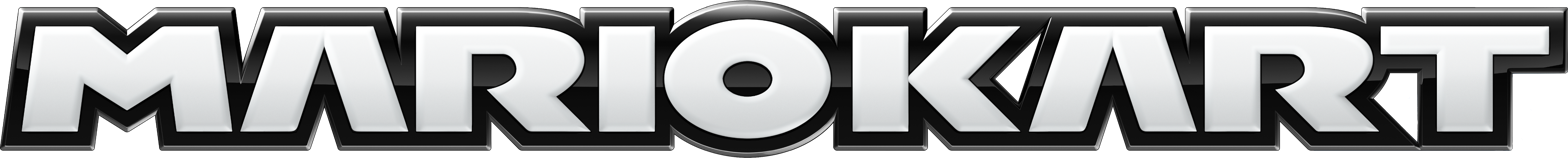
The series logo since Mario Kart DS, used until Mario Kart World

=== Super Mario Kart ===
Releasing in 1992, development of Super Mario Kart was overseen by Mario creator Shigeru Miyamoto, the Japanese designer of many successful Nintendo games including Super Mario Bros. The idea for the game stemmed from the fact that the high- speed racing game F-Zero lacked multiplayer. However, hardware limitations would cause the size of tracks in the game to be much smaller than they were in F-Zero due to the hardware resources taken up by multiplayer racing, making the track design more focused on turns than maintaining speed.

== Games ==
Release timeline Console games in bold
1992	**Super Mario Kart**
1993
1994
1995
1996	**Mario Kart 64**
1997
1998
1999
2000
2001	**Mario Kart: Super Circuit**
2002
2003	**Mario Kart: Double Dash!!**
2004
2005	Mario Kart Arcade GP
2005	**Mario Kart DS**
2006
2007	Mario Kart Arcade GP 2
2008	**Mario Kart Wii**
2009
2010
2011	**Mario Kart 7**
2012
2013	Mario Kart Arcade GP DX
2014	**Mario Kart 8**
2015
2016
2017	**Mario Kart 8 Deluxe**
2017	Mario Kart Arcade GP 2
2018
2019	Mario Kart Tour
2020	**Mario Kart Live: Home Circuit**
2021
2022
2023
2024
2025	**Mario Kart World**

=== Console ===
Game	Details
Super Mario Kart Original release dates: JP: August 27, 1992; NA: September 1, 1992; UK: October 1992; EU: January 21, 1993	Release years by system: 1992 – Super Nintendo Entertainment System 2009 – Wii; 2013 – Wii U 2016 – New Nintendo 3DS; 2019 – Nintendo Switch
Mario Kart 64 Original release dates: JP: December 14, 1996; NA: February 10, 1997; EU: June 24, 1997	Release years by system: 1996 – Nintendo 64 2003 – iQue Player; 2021 – Nintendo Switch
Mario Kart: Super Circuit Original release dates: JP: July 21, 2001; NA: August 27, 2001; EU: September 14, 2001	Release years by system: 2001 – Game Boy Advance 2011 – Nintendo 3DS; 2014 – Wii U 2023 – Nintendo Switch
Mario Kart: Double Dash Original release dates: JP: November 7, 2003; PAL: November 14, 2003; NA: November 17, 2003	Release years by system: 2003 – GameCube
Mario Kart DS Original release dates: NA: November 14, 2005; AU: November 17, 2005; PAL: November 25, 2005; JP: December 8, 2005	Release years by system: 2005 – Nintendo DS 2015 – Wii U
Mario Kart Wii Original release dates: JP: April 10, 2008; EU: April 11, 2008; NA: April 27, 2008	Release years by system: 2008 – Wii
Mario Kart 7 Original release dates: JP: December 1, 2011; EU: December 2, 2011; NA: December 4, 2011	Release years by system: 2011 – Nintendo 3DS
Mario Kart 8 Original release dates: JP: May 29, 2014; NA/EU: May 30, 2014	Release years by system: 2014 – Wii U
Mario Kart 8 Deluxe Original release dates: WW: April 28, 2017; CHN: March 16, 2020	Release years by system: 2017 – Nintendo Switch
Mario Kart Live: Home Circuit Original release date: WW: October 16, 2020	Release years by system: 2020 – Nintendo Switch
Mario Kart World Original release date: WW: June 5, 2025	Release years by system: 2025 – Nintendo Switch 2

=== Arcade ===
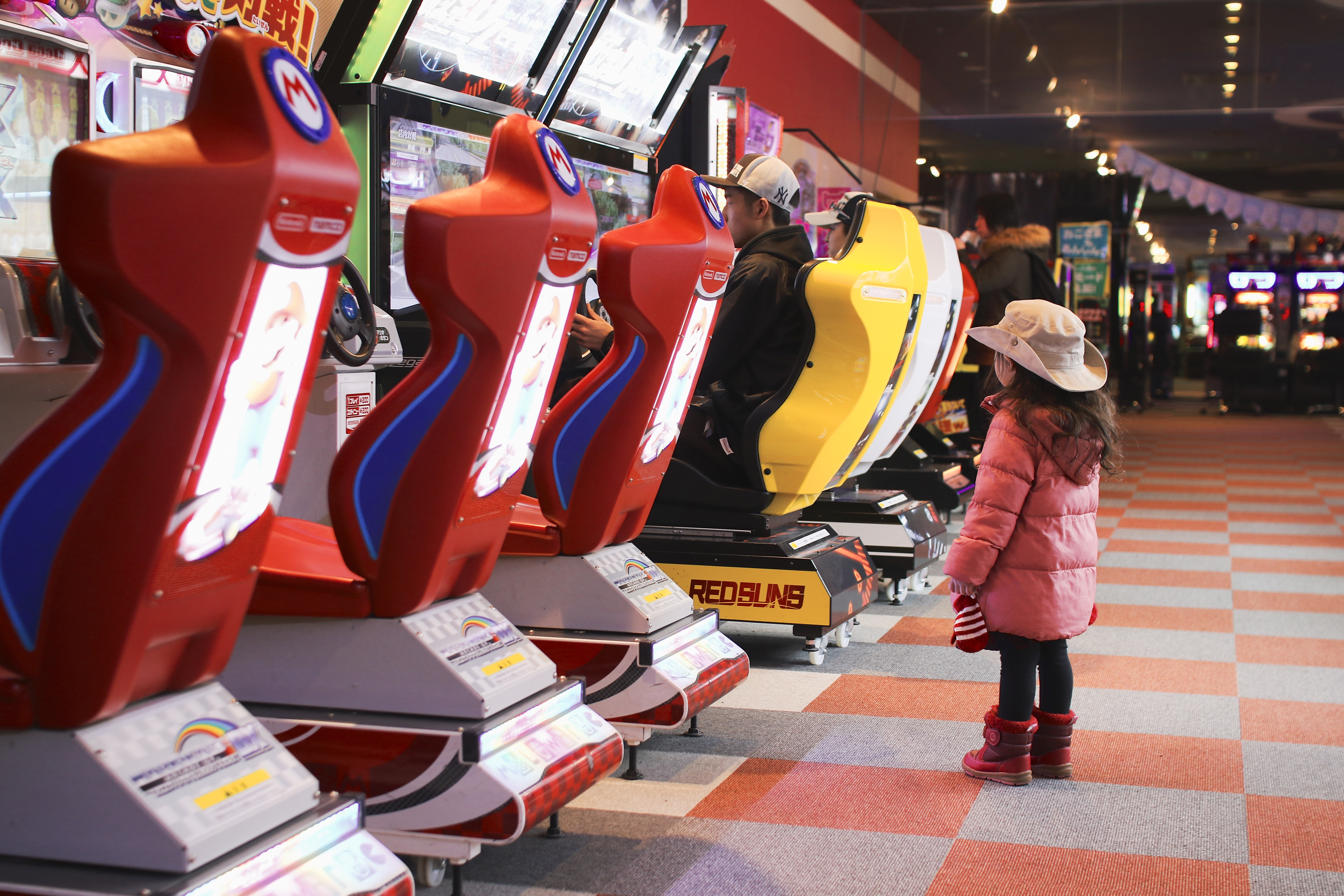
Seats for Mario Kart games (left) in a Japanese arcade

- Mario Kart 64 Slot Machine (1996, developed by Maygay)
- Mario Kart Arcade GP (2005, developed by Namco)
- Mario Kart Arcade GP 2 (2007, developed by Namco Bandai Games)
- Mario Kart Arcade GP DX (2013, developed by Namco Bandai Games)
- Mario Kart Arcade GP VR (2017, developed by Bandai Namco Studios)

=== Mobile ===
- Mario Kart Tour (2019)

=== Canceled games ===
- **VB Mario Kart** was scheduled for the Virtual Boy in 1995. It was revealed in a 2000 issue of German gaming magazine The Big N, but was canceled early in development prior to its official announcement due to the Virtual Boy's commercial failure.
- **Mario Kart XXL** is an unreleased Game Boy Advance tech demo developed by Denaris Entertainment Software for Nintendo in 2004. It was originally created as a non-Mario demo known as R3D-Demo before being repurposed. In 2022, A rom of the tech demo resurfaced online.
- **Mario Motors** was a planned spin-off of the Mario Kart series for the Nintendo DS. It was revealed for the first time at the Reboot Development Conference 2018. The game was going to be co-developed by Yoot Saito. The concept of the game was to allow players to build their own karts.

== Locations ==
=== Rainbow Road ===
Rainbow Road is a fictional race track that frequently appears, in various unique incarnations, as a level in the Mario Kart series of kart racing games by Nintendo, usually as the last track in each game.

=== Waluigi Pinball ===
Waluigi Pinball (Note: Japanese: ワルイージピンボール, Hepburn: Waruīji Pinbōru) is a race track that made its first appearance in the 2005 video game Mario Kart DS, an entry in the Mario Kart series of kart racing games. The course takes place inside a giant pinball machine themed after the character Waluigi. It has reappeared, without much change, in later iterations of the series.

The track has received praise from critics, ranking high in all-time rankings of courses in the series. It has also been noted for its characterization of Waluigi and the execution of its concept.

=== Baby Park ===
Baby Park
- Mario Kart location
- Baby Park as reimagined in Mario Kart 8's DLC (2015)
- First appearance: Mario Kart: Double Dash (2003)
- Last appearance: Mario Kart Tour (2022)
- Created by: Nintendo EAD
- Genre: Kart racing

In-universe information
- Type: Kart circuit / amusement park
- Location: Mushroom Kingdom

Baby Park (Note: Japanese: ベビィパーク, Hepburn: Bebī Pāku) is a race track that made its first appearance in Mario Kart: Double Dash (2003). The race track is a simple oval shape set within an amusement park. The track itself is in the shape of an oval with two sharp hairpin turns on either side, allowing the player to perform drifts. Baby Park reappeared in the subsequent entry in the Mario Kart series, Mario Kart DS (2005), as one of the game's retro tracks. Baby Park did not make a follow-up appearance until the second wave of downloadable content for Mario Kart 8 in 2015, alongside other new and returning tracks. Its most recent appearance was in 2022 in the "Cat Tour" update for Mario Kart Tour. In Mario Kart 8, Baby Park was redesigned to be placed at an angle to make the track accessible for anti-gravity racing, 8's signature game mechanic that allows racers to drive on uneven sections of track and collide with other racers for speed boosts.

The track is one of the shortest in the Mario Kart series, taking only ten to twenty seconds to clear a lap normally, and only eight seconds in Mario Kart 8's fastest driving speed. To balance out Baby Park's short size, the track takes seven laps to complete in Double Dash and 8, and five laps in DS and Tour, compared to the usual three laps for most tracks in the series. Due to its short size, the track became notorious for its close-proximity racing and item attacks. Items such as green shells can ricochet off the walls multiple times, making the track become a lot trickier to navigate. Additionally, the length often causes players to lap others who are far behind, meaning no matter the player's position they are susceptible to every players' item attack in their proximity.

A mock-up of Baby Park's map

==== Development ====
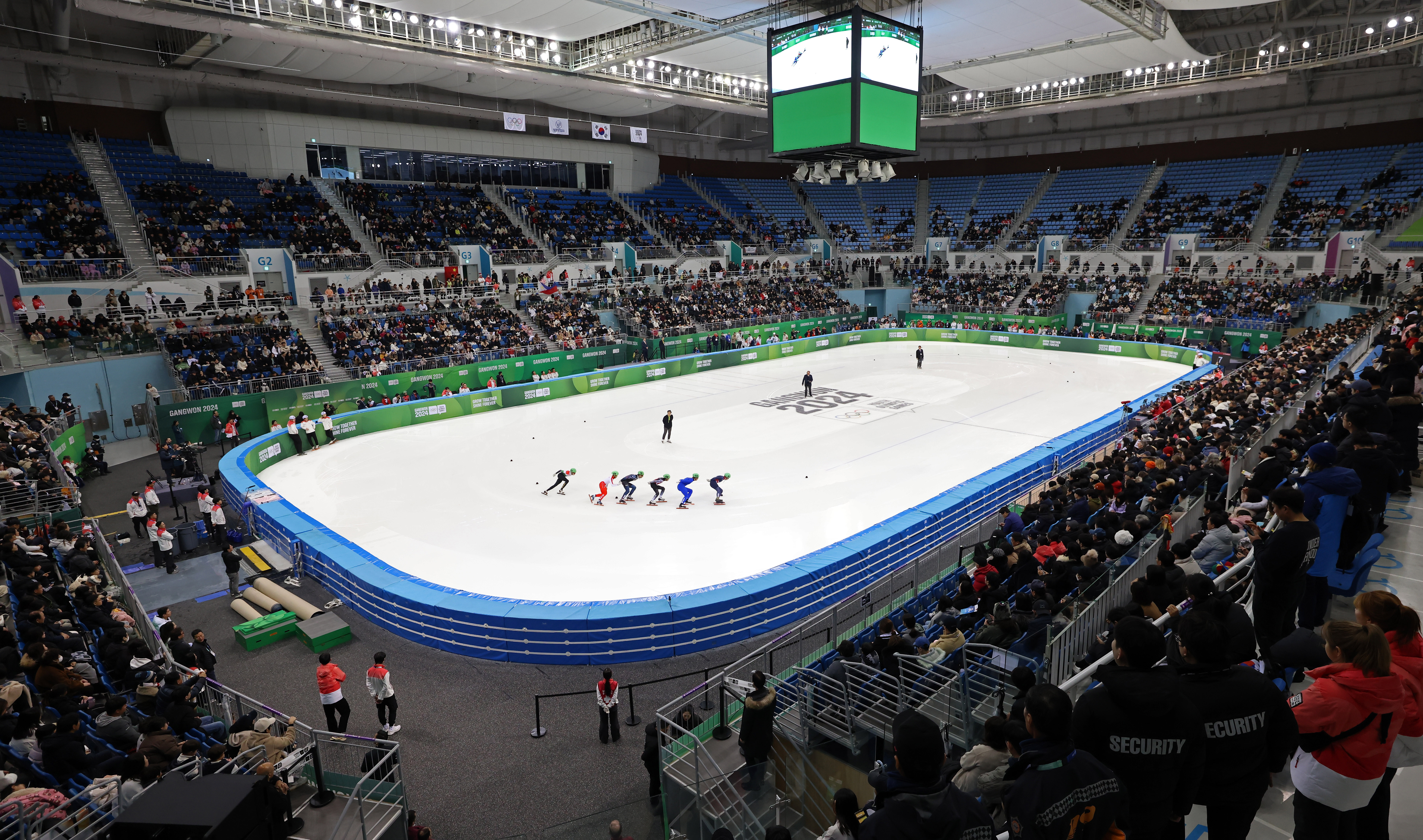
A short-track speed skating track, which Baby Park is similar in shape to

In an interview with Nintendo Dream, Double Dash producers Shinya Takahashi and Tadashi Sugiyama as well as chief director Kiyoshi Mizuki discussed how Baby Park was designed as "a simple course suitable for time trials", where players could use their items aggressively. They also stated that the track was inspired by those in short-track speed skating after having seen them at the 2002 Winter Olympics and indoor kart racing which was experiencing short-lived popularity in Japan around the time of development. When creating the track, developers designed a "quick little test track" which they ended up leaving as is due to them finding it fun.

==== Reception ====
Baby Park has gained generally positive reception, topping lists of Mario Kart tracks and many publications declaring it as one of the best the series has to offer. Screen Rant's Scott Baird commented that what made the track work well was its simplistic and cramped layout, which meant that no position was safe from any other player's barrage of items. He stated that Baby Park "[encapsulates] what makes Mario Kart fun in only a tiny arena". CJ Andriessen from Destructoid commented that Baby Park was like no other track, describing it as a "baby-themed thunder dome". He likened it more to the series' Battle Mode, adding that he preferred the Double Dash version because of that game's character exclusive items making it a lot more hectic. GamesRadar+'s David Roberts felt Baby Park is the best track for item-based races, adding that it's the source for consistent chaos and madness but does not get old thanks to its short length. When correcting mistakes in their Double Dash review, Edge Online recounted Baby Park as being the series at its "brilliant, chaotic best", feeling this was as mad as the series got. Red Bull listed the track as one of the best circuits in video games, citing that despite its unassuming appearance, it was home to the most chaotic battles in the series.

Vice's Kate Gray wrote about how she commended the track for combining the concepts of chaos and tight, incentivising turns requiring a good understanding of drifting; she stated that the combination made Baby Park the series' "one true track". Gray further equated the track to a battle of survival, describing it as the "perfect microcosm of equality". Later writing for Nintendo Life, she continued to praised the track as being a combination of what she believes makes the series great, describing it as being like "a sprint, a hurdle race, and an obstacle course". Gray further asked that the series include more tracks like Baby Park, believing Mario Kart lacks fast, simple courses. Conversely, Mike Diver of Waypoint disputed Gray's praise when comparing the track to those featured in Mario Kart 8's Star Cup, marking it as being repetitive and lacking memorable moments, though stated it was still great in isolation of the comparison. The Shacknews staff ranked Baby Park as their least favourite track in Mario Kart 8 Deluxe, rhetorically asking why it even returned. They ascribed the negative placement due to believing its layout was boring and small, causing items to lack strategy or reason. Zachary Miller from Nintendo World Report praised Baby Park for its chaotic nature thanks to the combination of items and a simple layout, commenting that it makes the track more about luck rather than skill. Miller also praised 8's version, describing it as being magical. Game Rant's Kirsten Moreton similarly agreed, believing that the track's reliance on items embraced what made the series stand out amongst other titles in the genre. Moreton continued that the track coupled with items made Baby Park unpredictable and unique among the series.

== Legacy ==
Sales and aggregate review scores As of December 31, 2025.
Game	Year	Units sold (in millions)	GameRankings	Metacritic	OpenCritic
Super Mario Kart (SNES)	1992	8.76	94%	—	—
Mario Kart 64 (N64)	1996	9.87	87%	83/100	—
Mario Kart: Super Circuit (GBA)	2001	5.90	99%	93/100	—
Mario Kart: Double Dash (GCN)	2003	6.96	87%	87/100	—
Mario Kart DS (DS)	2005	23.60	91%	91/100	—
Mario Kart Wii (Wii)	2008	37.38	82%	82/100	—
Mario Kart 7 (3DS)	2011	18.99	85%	85/100	—
Mario Kart 8 (Wii U)	2014	8.46	88%	88/100	88%
Mario Kart 8 Deluxe (NS)	2017	70.59	99%	92/100	92%
Mario Kart Live: Home Circuit (NS)	2020	1.73	—	75/100	44%
Mario Kart World (NS2)	2025	14.03	—	86/100	97%

=== Reception ===
The Mario Kart series is critically acclaimed. Nintendo Power named it one of the greatest multiplayer experiences, citing the diversity in game modes and the entertainment value. The first game in the series, Super Mario Kart, received critical acclaim and proved to be a commercial success; it received a Player's Choice release after selling one million copies and went on to sell 8.76 million copies worldwide, becoming the fourth best-selling game ever for the SNES. In Japan, it was the top-selling game in September 1992 and became a multi-million seller in 1992, eventually selling a total of 3.82 million in Japan. In Europe, it was the top-selling game during the first quarter of 1993, above the Sega Mega Drive games Sonic the Hedgehog 2 and Streets of Rage 2 during the same period. In the United Kingdom, Super Mario Kart was the top-selling Super NES game in February 1993, and it went on to be the seventh best-selling game of 1993 with more than 250,000 sales in the country. Darran Jones of NowGamer suggested that the success of Super Mario Kart resulted from the Super Mario characters, and being a new type of racing game.

The second game, Mario Kart 64, received "generally favorable" reviews according to the review aggregator website Metacritic. The game was commercially successful, selling 9.87 million copies worldwide—the second-bestselling game on the N64. It was the highest selling game in the United States over the first three months of 1997, and reached over one million sales within two months of its release in the region. By 1999, Mario Kart 64 had sold 6.23 million copies in the United States and 2.06 million units in Japan, the highest and third-highest selling N64 game in those regions respectively.

Although Super Circuit received acclaim, it ranks low on critics' lists of the best Mario Kart games, and Nintendo World Report said it was the Mario Kart game with the fewest innovations. Critics blamed this on the hardware limitations of the GBA; GamesRadar said that the scarcity of the Link Cable made the multiplayer experience less memorable than other Mario Kart games. Kotaku described Super Circuit as "lost", unable to live up to the technically pioneering releases of Super Mario Kart and 64. Nonetheless, critics rank Super Circuit among the best GBA games.

The fourth game, Mario Kart: Double Dash, received "generally favorable" reviews from critics according to review aggregator website Metacritic. Nintendo Power gave the game a perfect score, and said the graphics were of "3-D perfection" and the controls and game mechanics "rival those of any [GameCube] racing game". Although the initial positive reviews, Double Dash has received criticism from the media. Considering the 7-year gap since Mario Kart 64, Davis from GameSpot stated that he was "a little disappointed with the limited scope [of Double Dash"]. Mirabella of IGN was critical towards Double Dash for not progressing beyond its predecessor, calling the game a "mediocre effort". G-Wok of GameRevolution criticized the game's single-player mode for lacking substance and the track design for being "bland".

Guinness World Records listed six records set by the Mario Kart series, including "First Console Kart Racing Game", "Best Selling Racing Game", and "Longest Running Kart Racing Franchise". Guinness World Records ranked Super Mario Kart number 1 of the top 50 console games of all time based on initial impact and lasting legacy. Super Mario Kart was inducted into the World Video Game Hall of Fame in 2019.

=== Sales ===
Like the Super Mario series, the Mario Kart series is a commercial success with 206 million copies sold in total. It is currently the most successful racing game franchise of all time. Super Mario Kart is the fourth-best-selling Super Nintendo Entertainment System game with 8.76 million copies sold. Mario Kart 64 is the second-best-selling game for the Nintendo 64 (behind Super Mario 64), at 9.87 million copies. Mario Kart: Double Dash is the second-best-selling GameCube game (next to Super Smash Bros. Melee) with 6.96 million copies sold. Mario Kart Wii is the second-best-selling in the series and is the second-best-selling Wii game (next to Wii Sports) at 37.38 million copies. Mario Kart 8 is the best-selling Wii U game at 8.46 million total copies sold. It was the fastest-selling Wii U game with 1.2 million copies shipped in North America and Europe combined on its first few days since launch, until Super Smash Bros. for Wii U. The enhanced port for the Nintendo Switch, Mario Kart 8 Deluxe, is the fastest-selling game in the series with 459,000 units sold in the United States in one day of its launch. It is the highest-selling Nintendo Switch game with a total of 70.59 million copies worldwide, outperforming the Wii U version. Both versions have a combined total of 79.05 million copies sold, making it the best-selling game in the series across regular and handheld consoles, and also the best selling Mario game as a whole. Additionally, it is the highest-selling Nintendo game, excluding the Wii bundle game Wii Sports. In Japan, Mario Kart World is the fastest-selling Mario Kart game and the bestselling Switch 2 game, selling 782,566 physical copies within the first four days. As of December 31, 2025, it had sold 14.03 million copies worldwide.

Mario Kart: Super Circuit is the fourth-best-selling GBA game at 5.9 million copies. The second portable game, Mario Kart DS, is the third-best-selling Nintendo DS game and the best-selling portable game in the series with a total of 23.6 million copies. Mario Kart 7 is the best-selling Nintendo 3DS game as of March 2023 at 18.98 million copies.

=== Merchandise ===
The Mario Kart series has had a range of merchandise. This includes a slot car racer series based on Mario Kart DS: one set of which comes with Mario and Donkey Kong figures, with Wario and Luigi available separately. A line of radio-controlled karts are controlled by Game Boy Advance-shaped controllers, and feature Mario, Donkey Kong, and Yoshi. There are additional, larger karts which are radio-controlled by a GameCube-shape controller. Many racer figurines have been made. Sound Drops were inspired by Mario Kart Wii with eight sounds including the Spiny Shell and the race start countdown. A landline telephone features Mario holding a lightning bolt while seated in his kart. K'Nex released Mario Kart Wii, Mario Kart 7, and Mario Kart 8 sets. Line released an animated sticker set with 24 stickers based on Mario Kart 8 and Mario Kart 8 Deluxe. Nintendo's customer rewards program, Club Nintendo, released a Mario Kart 8 soundtrack, a Mario Kart Wii-themed stopwatch, and three gold trophies modeled after those in Mario Kart 7. Before Club Nintendo, a Mario Kart 64 soundtrack was offered by mail. In 2014, McDonald's released Mario Kart 8 toys with Happy Meals. In 2018, Monopoly Gamer features a Mario Kart themed board game with courses from Mario Kart 8 serving as properties, ten playable characters as tokens (Mario, Luigi, Peach, Toad, Donkey Kong, Shy Guy, Metal Mario, Rosalina, Bowser, and Yoshi) and a special die with power-ups. In 2019, Hot Wheels released Mario Kart sets of cars and tracks. In commemoration of Mario Day celebrations for March 10, 2021, Hot Wheels also released a Mario Kart track set based on Rainbow Road on June 24, 2021. In 2020, for the Super Mario Bros. 35th Anniversary, Cold Stone Creamery released Mario themed desserts including a Rainbow Road themed ice cream cake, from September 30 to December 15.

=== Rental go-kart dispute ===
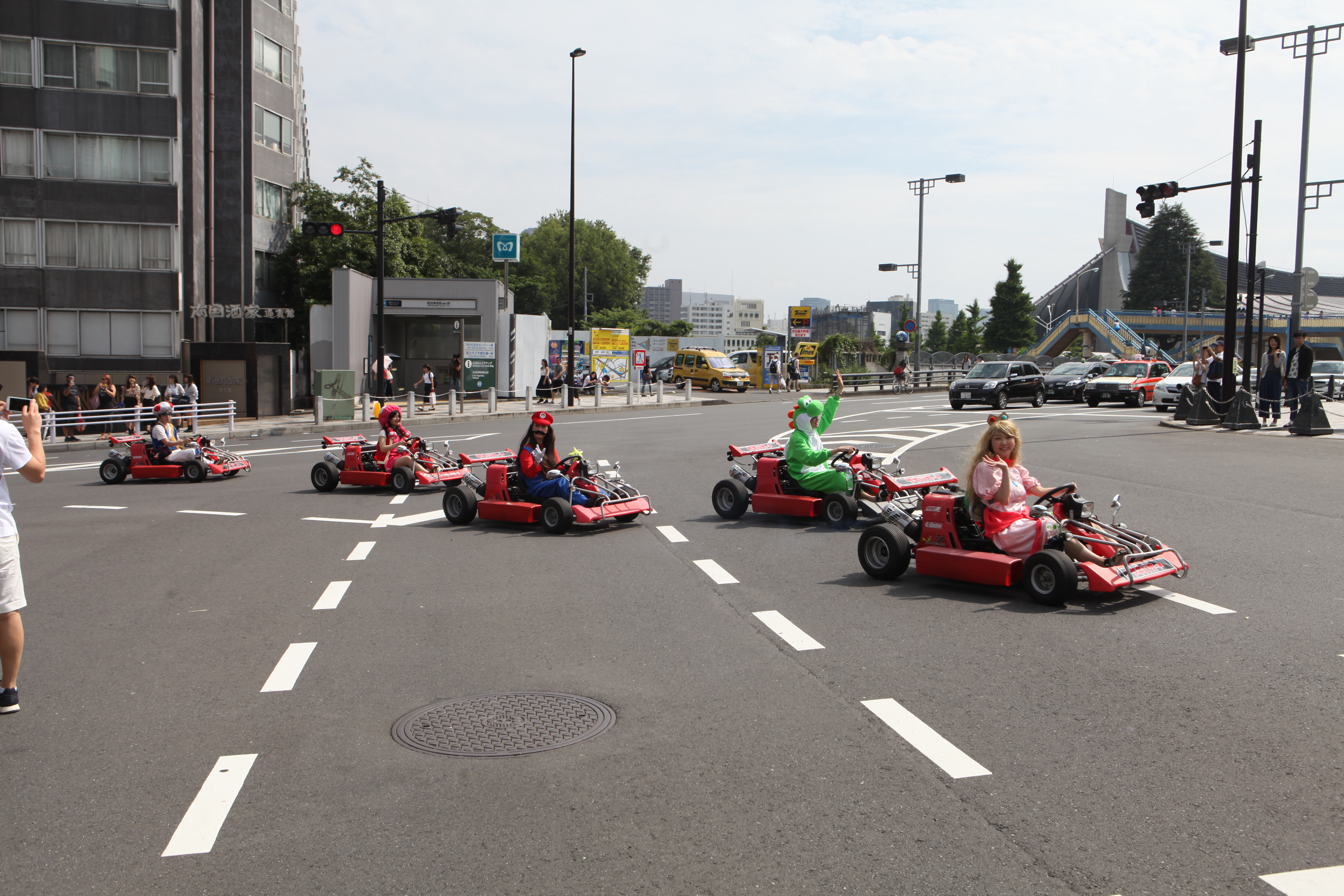
Go-karters dressed as Nintendo characters in Harajuku, Tokyo

In September 2016, Nintendo filed an objection against the Japanese company MariCar, which rents go-karts modified for use on public roads in Tokyo along with costumes resembling Nintendo characters. MariCar's English website warned customers not to throw "banana peels" or "red turtle shells". The service is popular with tourists.

Nintendo argued that the MariCar name was "intended to be mistaken for or confused with" Mario Kart, citing games commonly known by abbreviations in Japan, such as Pokémon (for Pocket Monsters) and Sumabura (Super Smash Bros.). In January 2017, the Japan Patent Office dismissed the objection, ruling that MariCar was not widely recognized as an abbreviation of Mario Kart.

In February 2017, Nintendo sued MariCar over copyright infringement for renting unauthorized costumes of Nintendo characters and using their images to promote its business. In September 2018, MariCar was ordered to stop using the characters and pay Nintendo ¥10 million in damages.

=== Theme park attraction ===
Universal Destinations & Experiences' immersive Super Nintendo World areas in Universal Studios Japan, Universal Studios Hollywood, and Universal Epic Universe feature the Mario Kart: Bowser's Challenge ride as their primary "anchor" attraction. Utilizing innovative augmented reality technology and dark ride set design, guests travel through several environments from Mario Kart 8, including Rainbow Road. The Japan version of the attraction includes a Mario Kart themed shop called "Mario Motors", and a nearby "Pit Stop Popcorn" food stand.

=== Formula E attack mode ===
Starting with its 2018–19 season, electric open wheel racing series Formula E added a so-called "attack mode", which allows a driver to gain a temporary speed boost if they take an alternate lane (highlighted on television via augmented reality computer graphics). The concept has been described by members of the press and by series CEO Alejandro Agag as inspired by Mario Kart.

=== Competitive play and online communities ===
Although Mario Kart 8 Deluxe is primarily marketed as a party game, online matching, time trials, and tournaments have become the mainstays of the competitive scene, which has grown significantly. In order to contribute to an evolving metagame, competitive players regularly examine the best kart combinations, character characteristics, and track-specific shortcut methods.

Nintendo introduced the Nintendo Switch Online service in 2018, giving players access to regional tournament events and online competitions held via Nintendo's digital infrastructure. Both ranked and unranked races are possible through the game's global matching system, which aids in the development of skill and league-based communities.

The competitive ecosystem has also been increased by independent tournament organizers and online communities through time trial challenges, invite tournaments, and seasonal leagues. By facilitating live streams and community interaction, on streaming services like Twitch and YouTube have helped the competitive scene become more visible and sustainable.

Although professional esports games like League of Legends and Counter-Strike are not typically grouped with Mario Kart 8 Deluxe, academics have observed that competitive scenes can develop naturally through player organization and digital connectivity rather than exclusively through developer-driven franchising models. Additional downloadable content expansions, such as the Booster Course Pass, which revived community involvement years after its initial release, have contributed to the game's endurance in competitive settings
