= Mario Kart Arcade GP =

Japanese video game franchise

- Logo used for the initial installment, Mario Kart Arcade GP (2005)
- Genre: Racing
- Developers: Namco; Bandai Namco Studios
- Publishers: Namco; Nintendo; Bandai Namco Amusement
- First release: Mario Kart Arcade GP; October 2005
- Latest release: Mario Kart Arcade GP VR; July 14, 2017
- Parent series: Mario Kart

Mario Kart Arcade GP (Note: Japanese: マリオカート アーケードグランプリ, Hepburn: Mario Kāto Ākēdo Guran Puri) is a sub-series of arcade games in Nintendo's Mario Kart series developed specifically for arcades in collaboration with Namco (later Bandai Namco Games and Bandai Namco Amusement). To date, four entries have been released—Mario Kart Arcade GP (2005), Mario Kart Arcade GP 2 (2007), Mario Kart Arcade GP DX (2013), and Mario Kart Arcade GP VR (2017). With the exception of Arcade GP DX, the games are considered to be relatively rare outside of Japan, with the fourth title not seeing a release outside of Japan at all. The games have been generally well-received by critics, who have praised the game's transition of traditional Mario Kart gameplay into an arcade game format, while lamenting that none of the entries have been released outside of the arcade format onto any of Nintendo's home video game consoles.

== Gameplay ==
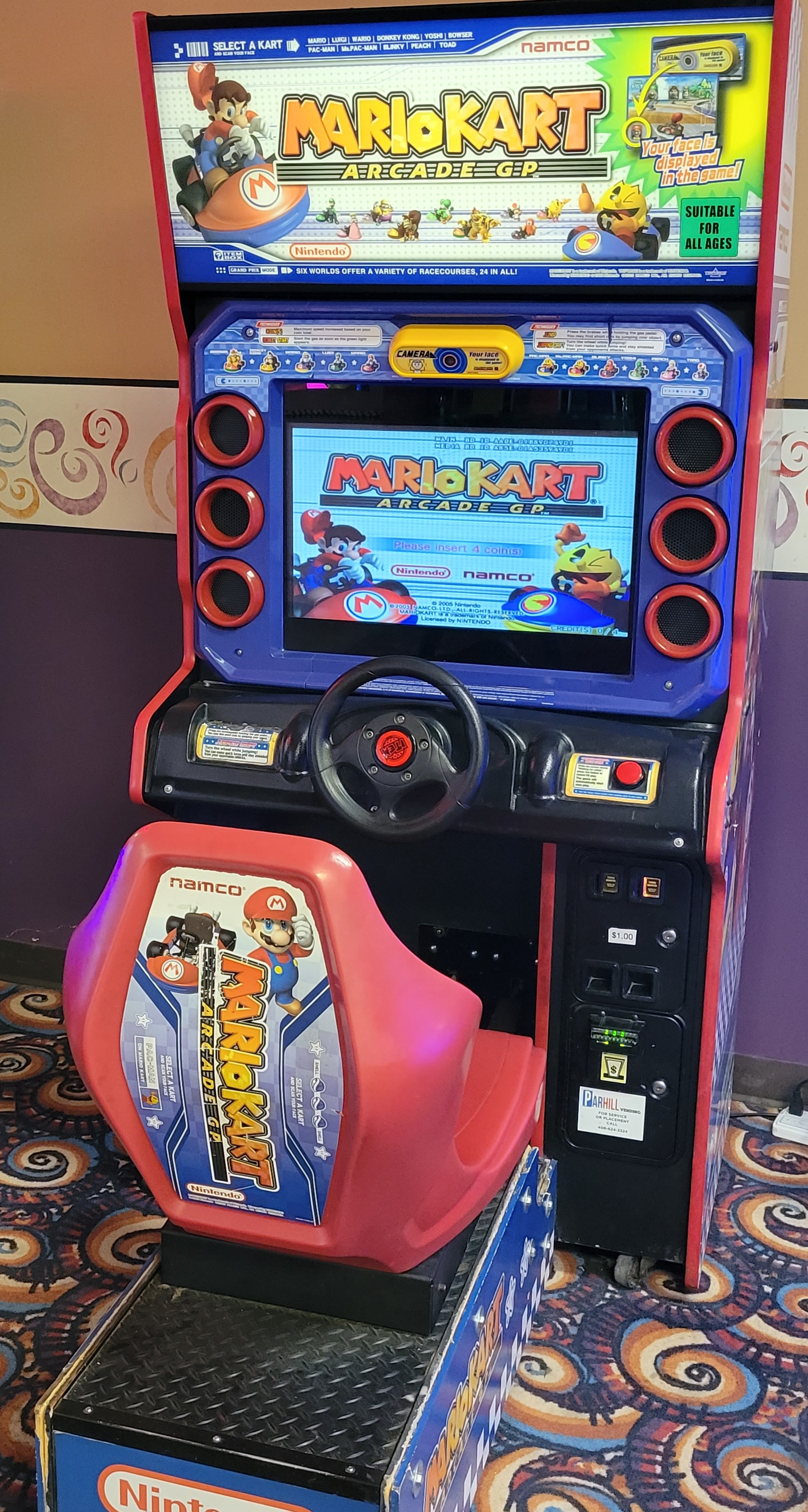
The arcade cabinet of the game

Mario Kart Arcade GP plays and controls similarly to most entries in the Mario Kart series, except for the differing input methods: instead of joystick and buttons to steer, accelerate, and brake, the arcade cabinets control with a steering wheel, gas pedal, and brake pedal. The goal of the game remains the same; players must drive their go-kart through a given course in hopes of completing it faster than competing racers. Like prior Mario Kart games, Arcade GP features "rubber band" physics, a feature that generally makes the game harder for players who are doing well, and easier for players who are struggling, to help balance competition among players. The game consists of three different game modes - "Grand Prix", "Time Trial", and "Multi-player". Grand Prix works similarly to other entries in the series, where the player races against computer-controlled opponents in a series of four races, earning points based on what place they finish a race. However, real-world money must be paid to participate in each individual race, or the cup is ended in forfeiture. If the player completes all four races, they may play a special "Bonus Mission" similar to the "Mission Mode" from Mario Kart DS. For example, one mission requires the player to push an oversized melon through a course across a finish line. Time Trial mode removes all other characters from the course, and the player simply races solo, aiming to achieve the fastest possible completion time. Multiplayer Mode involves up to players competing against one another on up to four connected machines.

Mario Kart Arcade GP features race tracks organized into six sets ("Cups") with 4 race courses in each. Races grouped together in cups generally share a common theme of sorts, such as sharing elements from various franchise such as Super Mario or Donkey Kong. Selectable playable racers include eight characters from Nintendo's Mario franchise—Mario, Luigi, Princess Peach, Wario, Bowser, Toad, Yoshi and Donkey Kong—alongside three character's from Namco's Pac-Man series—Pac-Man, Ms. Pac-Man, and Blinky.

Despite many similarities to the mainline Mario Kart titles, some key differences were implemented into Arcade GP. Rather than simply bumping into characters when colliding, characters now punch at one another. The game also uses Namco's "NamCam" system; once a player sits down in the arcade booth, it takes a photo of one's face. The photo is altered depending on what character the player chooses—for example, choosing Mario adds Mario's hat on the photo—and the photo hangs over the player character, making it easier for other players to recognize real people from computer-controlled ones. While the game still involves the collection and use of item to either attack other players or help boost one's own place in the race, the game contains far more items than most entries, upwards towards a 100 different items, though not all are available in all races. It contains many staple items from Mario Kart games, such as Koopa Shells as projectile weapons to be shot at other racers to slow them down, and Mario mushrooms to give a speed boost. Many new items were implemented as well, such as a Dr. Mario virus that blurs the players screen, and tornado, oil can, and "square tire" items that can be fired at other players to disrupt and slow them down. Players may also purchase a rewritable "memory card" that can be inserted into the arcade machine to save information, stats, save items, and submit information in contests.

The sequel, Mario Kart Arcade GP 2 retains and adds upon the content of the original Arcade GP. The game retains all of the playable characters from the first Arcade GP game, and adds two new ones—Waluigi from Nintendo's Mario franchise and Mametchi from Bandai Namco's Tamagotchi franchise. In addition to the original's race tracks and Cups, another two Cups of tracks are added to Arcade GP 2. New items were added to the game, such as the F.L.U.D.D. water device from Super Mario Sunshine and Tamagotchi toys themselves. The original "NamCam" system was improved in both image quality and expanded to have further alterations and effects added. Entirely new features include an announcer that provides play-by-play commentary on the race, and the ability for advanced players to unlock alternate hidden karts.

The third title, Mario Kart Arcade GP DX, drew inspiration from Mario Kart 7 in including hang gliders and underwater driving segments, and a co-op mode similar to Mario Kart: Double Dash where two characters ride on a single vehicle, and the two players share control. The game also added a new set of courses themed around Namco Bandai's Taiko no Tatsujin series, and added its mascot, "Don-Chan", as a playable character.

The fourth title, Mario Kart Arcade GP VR, represented a major change in direction and gameplay. The game is played in a hybrid arcade cabinet/virtual reality set up with an HTC Vive. Racing is done from a first person perspective. Through a Vive Tracker, the game has motion control aspects, such as actually moving one's hand to pick up items and throw them at other players. Racing is however far more restricted and structured into shorter segments, more comparable to a roller coaster.

== Development and release ==
After losing third party software development support with the Nintendo 64, Nintendo executed a number of efforts to increase developer support with their follow-up, the GameCube. One of these efforts was a collaboration with Sega and Namco to create the Triforce arcade system. Its creation was to benefit all parties; for Nintendo, it would help in the creation of home console versions of arcade games, as the Triforce hardware was very similar to the GameCube and easily facilitated ports. Sega and Namco, on the other hand, were allowed to create games using Nintendo's IP. While Sega would develop and release F-Zero AX for arcades and its subsequent GameCube version F-Zero GX, Namco would develop Mario Kart Arcade GP. All of this led to speculation that Mario Kart Arcade GP would receive a GameCube or Wii version as well, though no such version was ever announced.

Mario Kart Arcade GP first announced in February 2005, with a Japanese release date of Q3 2005. It was later delayed to December 2005. While its initial announcement did not mention any plans for a Western release, in September 2005, it was announced for a North American release. The game was released in North America in October 2005, two months prior to the Japanese release.

Mario Kart Arcade GP 2 was first announced in October 2006, as a sequel to the original Mario Kart Arcade GP released a year prior. The game was co-developed by Namco Bandai and Nintendo. With its announcement occurring so close to the launch of Nintendo's then-upcoming Wii home console, some publications expected the game to release on updated an updated arcade board, but it was later revealed to run on the same Triforce arcade hardware of its predecessor. The Triforce arcade board was created in collaboration with Namco and Sega to bolster third party game support for Nintendo's own GameCube hardware; Nintendo allowed for the use of their intellectual property in arcade games in exchange of more third party game support of their home video game consoles. However, like its predecessor, Arcade GP 2 did not ever receive a GameCube, Wii, or any release outside of arcades. The game was released to arcades in March 2007.

Mario Kart Arcade GP DX, the third entry in the Mario Kart Arcade GP sub-series, was released in late 2013. This entry is generally the most-commonly found of the sub-series, particularly in North America. Bandai Namco partnered with the Dave and Busters franchise to host the arcade machines.

The fourth entry, Mario Kart Arcade GP VR, was released in 2017. It was given a very restrictive release; primarily only being available in Bandai Namco's VR Zone arcade in Tokyo. The game also costs rough the equivalent of $40 USD to be played. It was temporarily made available outside of Japan in 2018 at an event at the Hollywood Bowl in the O2 in London.

== Reception ==
Mario Kart Arcade GP was generally well-received from publications. IGN, GameSpot, and Nintendo World Report all generally praised Namco's translation of the Mario Kart formula to an arcade game format. IGN named it their most enjoyable game of the Japan Amusement Machine and Marketing Association (JAMMA) expo, asserting that "Namco certainly got the Mario Kart feel right, and it didn't have too much trouble with the look, either. The tracks in Mario Kart Arcade GP are bright and colorful, fitting in perfectly with the visual look Nintendo tends to go for with the series." Nintendo World Report similarly praised the game for being fun and having a lot of content for an arcade game, while GameSpot concluded that "a sharp arcade racer with an abundance of charm. The selection of characters should please fans, as will the solid gameplay." Both IGN and GameSpot found the graphics technically better than Mario Kart: Double Dash on the GameCube, the most advanced title graphically at the time. Feelings on the controls were more mixed. Nintendo World Report found the pedals for gas and brakes "get the job done but aren’t overly interesting" and complained that the steering "feel[s] much looser than their console counterparts" and that due to "a much more sensitive analog wheel" the result was "over-steering constantly." Conversely, IGN was more positive, concluding that it "controls so well through a steering wheel that going back to a controller may be hard once you've experienced it." The game is generally considered rare and difficult to find in Western regions, with publications lamenting that Nintendo has not released the game on any home video game consoles.

Mario Kart Arcade GP 2 was praised by GamesRadar for being a fun improvement over the original Arcade GP, but was criticized as being closer to a minor upgrade seen in series like Capcom's updated versions of Street Fighter 2 rather than a full-fledged numbered sequel as its title suggested. IGN singled it out as a stand-out title to play in Japanese arcades, and praised the announcer giving play-by-play commentary of the race as a feature they hoped would be moved into future home console iterations of the game. Similarly, publications expressed hope Mario Kart Arcade GP DX would be released on the Wii U, Nintendo's home video game console active at the time, though no such release would materialize. Mario Kart Arcade GP VR was strongly praised by IGN for its fun gameplay and having an impressive sense of speed without any sense of motion sickness often experienced in fast moving virtual reality video games.
