= Mario Kart: Double Dash =

2003 video game

Mario Kart: Double Dash!!
- North American box art
- Developer: Nintendo EAD
- Publisher: Nintendo
- Directors: Yasuyuki Oyagi; Futoshi Shirai; Daiji Imai
- Producers: Shigeru Miyamoto; Tadashi Sugiyama; Shinya Takahashi; Takashi Tezuka
- Designer: Tsuyoshi Watanabe
- Programmer: Kenji Yamamoto
- Artist: Junji Morii
- Composers: Shinobu Tanaka; Kenta Nagata
- Series: Mario Kart
- Platform: GameCube
- Release: JP: November 7, 2003; PAL: November 14, 2003; NA: November 17, 2003
- Genre: Kart racing
- Modes: Single-player, multiplayer

Mario Kart: Double Dash!! (Note: Japanese: マリオカートダブルダッシュ, Hepburn: Mario Kāto: Daburu Dasshu!!) is a 2003 kart racing game developed and published by Nintendo for the GameCube. It is the fourth main entry in the Mario Kart series. Similar to previous titles, Double Dash challenges Mario series player characters to race against each other on 16 Mario-themed tracks. The game introduced a number of gameplay features, such as having two riders per kart.

Double Dash released in November 2003 and received positive reviews from critics, who praised the graphics, new gameplay features, character and item rosters, arcade aesthetic and track design, but the audio received mixed reactions. It was commercially successful, with more than 3.8 million copies sold in the United States, and more than 802,000 copies sold in Japan. It is the second best-selling GameCube game of all-time, selling around 7 million copies worldwide, behind Super Smash Bros. Melee.

== Gameplay ==
Donkey Kong and Wario racing at Luigi Circuit, the introductory track. Two players can ride on a kart instead of one in Mario Kart: Double Dash.

Mario Kart: Double Dash!! is a kart racing game in which the player controls characters from the Mario series, who operate karts in tandem: the rider in front drives the kart while the rider in back controls the use of items. Any combination of characters is possible; for example, Mario can be paired with his brother Luigi or his archenemy Bowser. In single-player mode, the player controls both riders, while in co-op play, each player controls one of the riders or, in vs play, each of the players control two riders like in single-player mode . While racing, the player can accelerate, steer, reverse, brake, drift, switch character positions or use weapons and power-ups with the game controller's analog stick and buttons. The game supports LAN setups for up to sixteen players in eight pairs.

Both characters and karts are divided into light, medium, and heavy classes; characters cannot ride in karts that are smaller than they are. Light karts have fairly low top speeds but accelerate quickly and are scarcely affected by off-road terrain. Heavy karts have high top speeds and can knock away lighter karts on impact but have poor acceleration and lose significant speed off-road. Medium karts are average in both speed and acceleration.

The player can acquire weapons and power-ups by running into Item Boxes scattered across the tracks and arenas of the game. The item the player receives is determined randomly and can be used to hinder other racers or boost the player's own performance. Each pair of characters has a unique item that others cannot receive and are picked up in the same way as standard items; for example, only Mario and Luigi can launch fireballs against other racers. Singular Item Boxes grant an item to the rear rider, while Double Item Boxes give an item to both riders. When a racer suffers a crash, any items they were carrying will fall onto the course, and any racer who runs into these items will be instantly affected. In co-op play, if the rear rider is not already carrying an item, they can steal an item from other racers by using one of the shoulder buttons to attack an opponent.

The player can send their kart into a drift by pressing one of the shoulder buttons while making a turn, allowing them to take a tight corner while maintaining speed. While drifting, the sparks emanating from the kart's tires will change color; the player will obtain a short burst of speed if they exit a drift when the sparks are blue. At the beginning of a race, the player can receive a burst of speed by pressing the acceleration button at the same time Lakitu's start signal turns green; if both players in co-op play execute this input simultaneously, an even greater burst of speed can be achieved.

=== Modes ===
Mario Kart: Double Dash!! features four game modes: Grand Prix, Time Trial, Versus, and Battle. In the Grand Prix mode, the player races in one of a series of Cups consisting of four tracks each. A race is held on each track, and the racers receive points depending on their finishing positions. Upon the conclusion of a Cup, the top three racers are awarded gold, silver and bronze trophies. A player who sets a new time record can enter their initials after the trophies are awarded. The Time Trial is a single-player mode in which the player can race over a set number of laps to record the fastest completion time. The player can set records in total race time and individual lap time, and can race against a "ghost", a recording of the player's best time on a track. A ghost cannot be created if the race takes too long or if the completed race is not faster than the current ghost. In the Versus mode, two or more human players can race against each other on any given track, with the race concluding when all but the last-place racer finish the race. The frequency of items and number of laps are customizable in this mode.

The Battle mode is divided into three multiplayer games that take place on one of a selection of arenas. In "Balloon Battle", each player has three balloons, with one being lost when a player is hit by a weapon or hazard; players who lose all their balloons are eliminated, with victory going to the last player standing. Players can steal balloons using the same method for stealing items in races. In "Shine Thief", players fight for possession of a single Shine Sprite, which activates a timer upon being collected. Whoever is holding the Shine Sprite when the timer reaches zero is the winner. Players can steal the Shine Sprite by attacking the player and making them drop it. In "Bob-omb Blast", players gain points by attacking other players with Bob-ombs and lose points when hit by opponents' Bob-ombs, with the winner being the first to reach three or four points depending on the number of players.

== Development and release ==
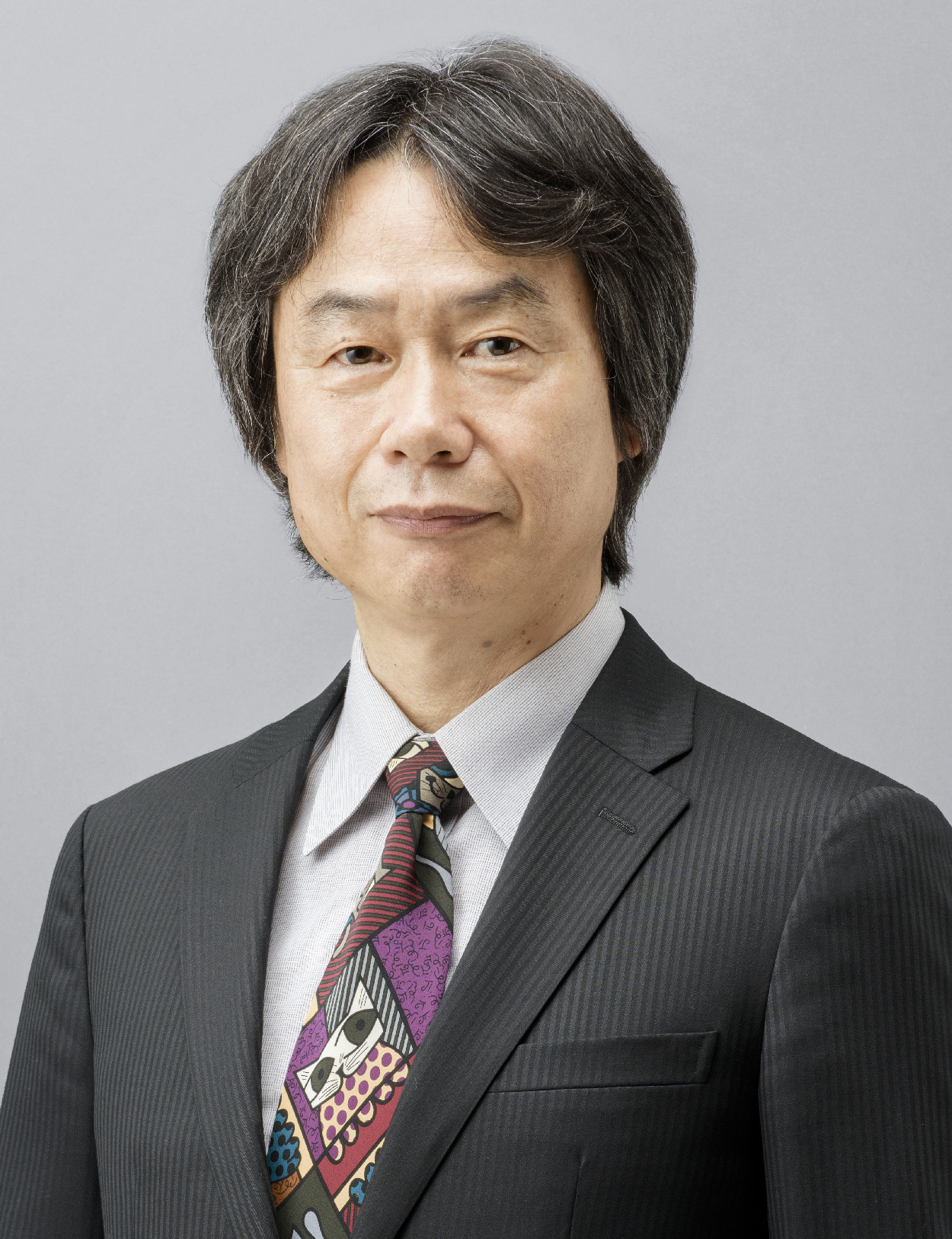
Shigeru Miyamoto provided a number of opinions to the development team.

Mario Kart: Double Dash!! was first shown at E3 2001 as a seven-second video clip. The clip featured Mario and Luigi driving their karts on a bump mapped 3D surface with no background. At the time, it was early in development, and the working title of the game was Mario Kart. In April 2003, Nintendo released the first pictures and details of the game, as well as revealing the title to be Mario Kart: Double Dash!!. At E3 2003, a playable demo was available. New features, such as having two characters drive one kart, had been implemented. An updated demo with some additions was shown at the Games Convention in August 2003. In September, Nintendo held a Gamers' Summit for the press, in which a nearly complete and more sped up version of Double Dash was displayed. The Gamers' Summit announced the North American release date to be November 17, 2003.

The development team struggled in devising gameplay features that would be enjoyed by the fans of the series. One of the hardest tasks chief director Kiyoshi Mizuki was assigned to do was to attract people who had no prior experience with the series; he decided to make the gameplay as simple as possible. Producer Shigeru Miyamoto presented the staff with a variety of opinions which they in turn would have to incorporate the best way possible. Miyamoto let the team decide which graphics they wanted to use without restrictions.

Connectivity to the Game Boy Advance was discussed as an opportunity among the developers, but they eventually agreed that Double Dash was not suited to these connectivity ideas and decided to exclude it. It was desirable to narrow down the gap between the ability of veteran and novice players. Gameplay features like the ability to escape the banana were removed; the staff wanted both veteran and novice players to enjoy the game.

A bonus disc was offered as a pre-order incentive in North America, containing playable demos of F-Zero GX, Mario Party 5, Sonic Heroes, Star Wars Rogue Squadron III: Rebel Strike, and Teenage Mutant Ninja Turtles. The disc also contains several video trailers, as well as the ability to unlock bonus content for Fire Emblem: The Blazing Blade on the Game Boy Advance using the GameCube – Game Boy Advance link cable.

== Reception ==
Reception

Aggregate score
Aggregator	Score
Metacritic	87/100

Review scores
Publication	Score
1Up.com	9.5/10
Electronic Gaming Monthly	10/10, 10/10, 9.5/10
Eurogamer	9/10
Game Informer	9.25/10
GameRevolution	B
GameSpot	7.9/10
GameSpy	4.5/5
GamesRadar+	95%
GameZone	9.7/10
IGN	7.9/10
Nintendo Life	9/10
Nintendo Power	5/5
Nintendo World Report	8.5/10
PALGN	7.5/10
X-Play	5/5

Mario Kart: Double Dash!! received "generally favorable" reviews from critics according to review aggregator website Metacritic. Nintendo Power gave the game a perfect score, and said the graphics were of "3-D perfection" and the controls and game mechanics "rival those of any [GameCube] racing game". Bro Buzz of GamePro commented that the gameplay remains "fast and furious". The feature of having two riders per kart was praised by Justin Leeper and Andy McNamara of Game Informer; McNamara stated: "Giving the player control of two different characters is pretty cool in single-player, but add a friend on the back of your kart in multiplayer and it opens the game up like never before." Bryn Williams of GameSpy called Double Dash a "great-looking, great-playing game that most gamers will instantly warm to." Tom Bramwell of Eurogamer thought the game was one of the "finest pieces of electronic entertainment ever developed." GameZone's Louis Bedigian felt that none of the racing games he had played for the GameCube were as "spectacular" as Double Dash. GMR's Andrew Pfister said, "Mario Kart: Double Dash is the most fun you'll have with a game this year. And probably next year. And maybe even the year after that". Electronic Gaming Monthly said that the game's "pure, exhilarating glee will envelop your soul".

Reactions to the audio were mixed. Ryan Davis of GameSpot and Skyler Miller of Xplay characterized the music as upbeat, with Davis classifying some of the tracks as ska, swing and big band. Leeper and Bramwell found the music infectious, and Bramwell and Planet GameCube's Jonathan Metts appreciated the soundtrack's focus on original compositions rather than arrangements of series standards. However, Metts and IGN's Fran Mirabella III dismissed the score as simplistic and unimpressive, and Metts considered the amount of whistling odd. The reviewers of Electronic Gaming Monthly also regarded some of the music to be subpar. Chris Sell of PALGN proclaimed that the music, while decent, was the game's weakest aspect and lacked the catchiness of previous Mario Kart titles. Bro Buzz said that while the audio was "safe and sweet", it was beginning to feel too familiar. Leeper, Davis and Metts warned of the repetitive character voices, with Metts mentioning that the player characters each had a single first-place victory comment. Mirabella and Sell remarked that the game's Dolby Pro Logic II support was useful in gauging when an opponent is approaching the player.

Double Dash has received criticism from the media. Considering the 7-year gap since Mario Kart 64, Davis stated that he was "a little disappointed with the limited scope of the game". Mirabella was critical towards Double Dash for not progressing beyond its predecessor, calling the game a "mediocre effort". G-Wok of GameRevolution criticized the game's single-player mode for lacking substance and the track design for being "bland".

=== Sales ===
In its first seven weeks of sales, Double Dash sold 1 million units, making it the fastest-selling GameCube game up to that point. By July 2006, the game had sold 2.2 million copies and earned $105 million in the United States. Next Generation ranked it as the 12th highest-selling game launched for the PlayStation 2, Xbox or GameCube between January 2000 and July 2006 in that country. The game ultimately sold 3.8 million units in the United States, and over 802,000 units in Japan. It received a "Gold" sales award from the Entertainment and Leisure Software Publishers Association (ELSPA), indicating sales of at least 200,000 copies in the United Kingdom. According to the NPD Group, Double Dash was the best-selling game of November 2003. It is also the third best-selling GameCube game in Australia and was rereleased under the label of Players Choice only in that region. Joystiq reported in February 2009 that the game had sold nearly seven million copies worldwide.

=== Awards ===
The game received the "Multiplayer Game" award from ITV's Game Stars in 2004. It received the GameCube Video Game of the Year award from the Video Software Dealers Association (VSDA). During the AIAS' 7th Annual Interactive Achievement Awards, Double Dash received a nomination for "Console Racing Game of the Year".

In 2009, the game placed 63rd in Official Nintendo Magazine's 100 greatest Nintendo games of all time. In 2021, Kotaku ranked the game second best Mario Kart game, praising the two-player co-op mode and track design.
