= Kart racing game =

Video game genre

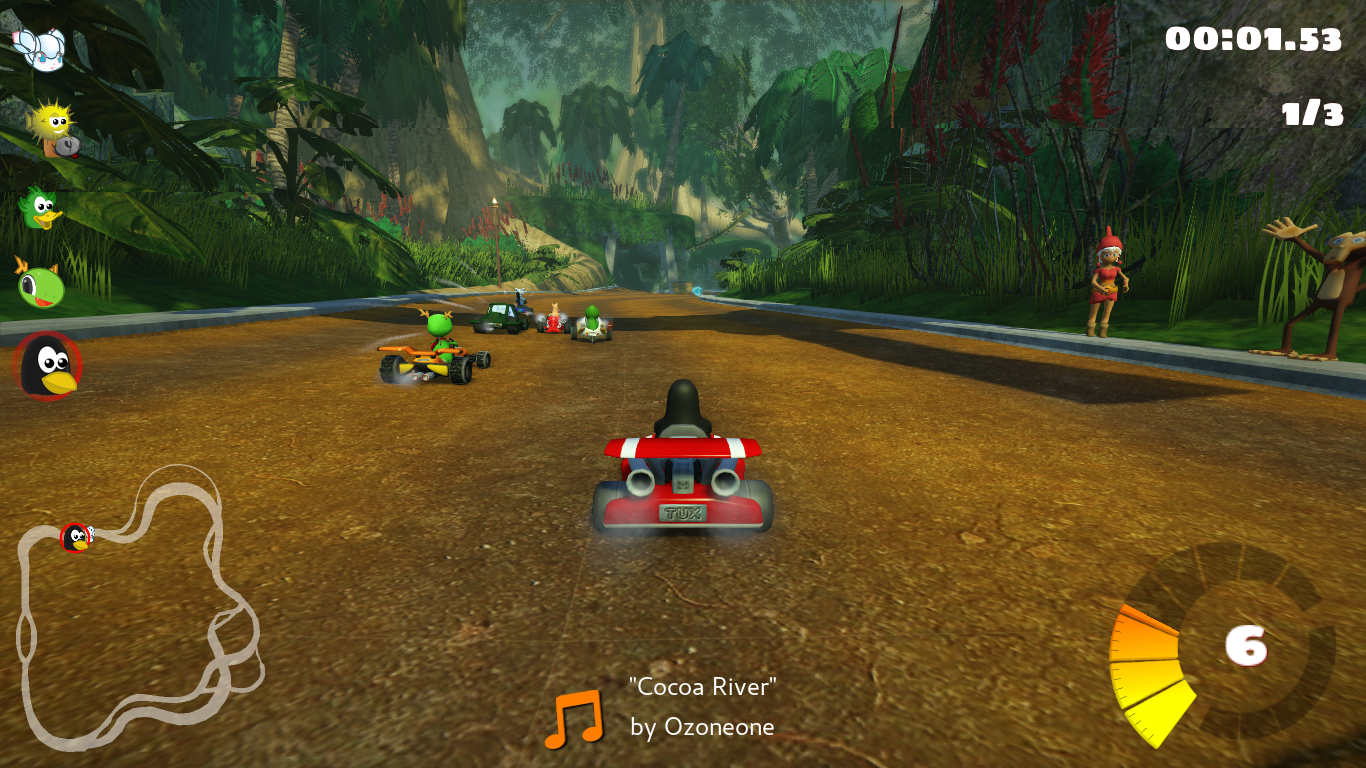
SuperTuxKart is a kart racing game featuring mascots of open-source software, such as Tux (center).

A kart racing game, also known as cart racing game or go-kart racing game, is a subgenre of racing games. Kart racing games have simplified driving mechanics while including unusual race track designs, obstacles, and vehicular combat. Though the genre has its roots in the 1980s, Super Mario Kart (1992) popularized the genre, with its subsequent series still being considered the foremost kart racing franchise with over 200 million copies sold.

== Mechanics and traits ==
Kart racing games are known to have simplified driving mechanics while adding obstacles, over-the-top racetrack designs, a wide range of background music and various action elements. Kart racers are also known to cast fictional characters, particularly from animated media franchises, as the drivers of vehicles with unusual designs, often reflecting the distinct trait or personality of the character. Vehicle design in kart racing games range from simplistic go-karts to unique, more complex designs such as monster trucks or sports cars, depending on the game. Kart racing games are a more arcade-like experience than other racing games and usually offer over-the-top gameplay in which player characters can utilize weapons and projectiles against one another, collect power-ups to gain advantage, or perform special techniques to gain a speed boost. Typically, in such games, vehicles move more like go-karts and motor scooters, lacking anything along the lines of a gear stick and clutch pedal. The simplistic controls in kart racing games may be comparable to controlling radio controlled cars.

Kart racing games are distinct from and not to be confused with kart simulators, which is a minor subgenre of racing simulator games that simulates actual kart racing without over-the-top gameplay elements.

== History ==
Power Drift featured go-kart racing in 1988, but Super Mario Kart (1992) is cited to have popularised the kart racing genre, being the first kart racing game to implement combat elements within races. The game was also slower than other racing games of the time due to hardware limitations, prompting its developers to use a go-kart theme. Since then, many kart racing games have been released, with franchises such as Nicktoons and South Park featuring such games. The Crash Bandicoot franchise in particular (starting with Crash Team Racing in 1999) consists of numerous kart racing video games.

The Mario Kart series is often considered as the pioneer of kart racing series, and is the most successful in the genre, topping other popular games such as Diddy Kong Racing. Though the genre seems to have been the most popular among developers during the 1990s, Mario Kart DS (2005), and Mario Kart Wii (2008) became two of the best-selling kart racing games. In the late 2010s, Mario Kart 8 and its Deluxe port became the best-selling racing video game of all time. The kart racing mobile game GKART/QQ Speed (2010), which was heavily inspired by Mario Kart, became one of the highest-grossing mobile games.
