= List of 2023 box office number-one films in Ecuador =

This is a list of films which placed number-one at the weekend box office in Ecuador during 2023.

== Number-one films ==
#	Weekend end date	Film	Box office	Openings in the top ten	Ref.
1	January 8, 2023	Puss in Boots: The Last Wish	$258,086	M3GAN #2	
2	January 15, 2023	No box office data for the weekend of January 15 2023.			
3	January 22, 2023	Puss in Boots: The Last Wish	$298,487	Lifemark #3	
4	January 29, 2023	Puss in Boots: The Last Wish	$232,459	The Fabelmans #3	
5	February 5, 2023	Puss in Boots: The Last Wish	$187,437	Knock at the Cabin #2	
6	February 12, 2023	Puss in Boots: The Last Wish	$6,421	Tár #5	
7	February 19, 2023	M3GAN	$2,457		
8	February 26, 2023	Puss in Boots: The Last Wish	$53,208		
9	March 5, 2023	Puss in Boots: The Last Wish	$52,810	Women Talking #2	
10	March 12, 2023	The Whale	$77,324		
11	March 19, 2023	The Whale	$72,923		
12	March 26, 2023	John Wick: Chapter 4	$362,472		
13	April 2, 2023	John Wick: Chapter 4	$207,406		
14	April 9, 2023	The Super Mario Bros. Movie	$1,871,890		
15	April 16, 2023	The Super Mario Bros. Movie	$1,692,662	Renfield #4	
16	April 23, 2023	The Super Mario Bros. Movie	$977,784		
17	April 30, 2023	The Super Mario Bros. Movie	$582,293	Cocaine Bear #2	
18	May 7, 2023	The Super Mario Bros. Movie	$244,853		
19	May 14, 2023	The Super Mario Bros. Movie	$112,299	Book Club: The Next Chapter #2	
20	May 21, 2023	Fast X	$1,809,973		
21	May 28, 2023	Fast X	$845,522	About My Father #3	
22	June 4, 2023	Fast X	$225,806		
23	June 11, 2023	Fast X	$6,734		
24	June 18, 2023	Fast X	$2,537		
25	June 25, 2023	About My Father	$1,860		
26	July 2, 2023	Ruby Gillman: Teenage Kraken	$51,485		
27	July 9, 2023	Ruby Gillman: Teenage Kraken	$33,626		
28	July 16, 2023	Ruby Gillman: Teenage Kraken	$19,363		
29	July 23, 2023	Oppenheimer	$40,933		
30	July 30, 2023	Joy Ride	$12,036		
31	August 6, 2023	Oppenheimer	$169,303		
32	August 13, 2023	Joy Ride	$1,740		
33	August 20, 2023	Oppenheimer	$40,759		
34	August 27, 2023	The Last Voyage of the Demeter	$38,610		
35	September 3, 2023	The Last Voyage of the Demeter	$16,762	Asteroid City #3	
36	September 10, 2023	Oppenheimer	$4,381		
37	September 17, 2023	Strays	$25,405		
38	September 24, 2023	Strays	$10,121		
39	October 1, 2023	Saw X	$232,638		
40	October 8, 2023	The Exorcist: Believer	$258,256		
41	October 15, 2023	The Exorcist: Believer	$155,128		
42	October 22, 2023	The Exorcist: Believer	$50,586		
43	October 29, 2023	Five Nights at Freddy's	$835,139	Trolls Band Together #2	
44	November 5, 2023	Five Nights at Freddy's	$439,619		
45	November 12, 2023	Saw X	$10,733		
46	November 19, 2023	The Hunger Games: The Ballad of Songbirds & Snakes	$193,953		
47	November 26, 2023	Five Nights at Freddy's	$36,469		
48	December 3, 2023	No box office data for the weekend of December 3 2023.			
49	December 10, 2023	The Hunger Games: The Ballad of Songbirds & Snakes	$31,408		
50	December 17, 2023	Migration	$91,669		
51	December 24, 2023	No box office data for the weekend of December 24 2023.			
52	December 31, 2023	No box office data for the weekend of December 31 2023.			

== See also ==
- 2023 in Ecuador

Preceded by 2022 Box office number-one films	Box office number-one films 2023	Succeeded by 2024 Box office number-one films
