= Rainbow Road =

Series of Mario Kart courses

- Mario Kart location
- The latest iteration of Rainbow Road, as seen in Mario Kart World
- First appearance: Super Mario Kart (1992)
- Created by: Nintendo EAD, Nintendo EPD
- Genre: Kart racing

In-universe information
- Type: Race track
- Location: Mushroom Kingdom; Outer space

Rainbow Road is a fictional race track that frequently appears, in various unique incarnations, as a level in the Mario Kart series of kart racing games by Nintendo, usually as the last track in each game.

== Characteristics ==
Rainbow Road customarily appears as the final brand-new track of each Mario Kart game and the final race of the Special Cup. It typically is among the most difficult to complete, since most Rainbow Road tracks often have little to no guardrails to prevent the player from falling off the edges of the track, and oftentimes feature tight curves, steep slopes, and wavy grounds.

== Appearances ==
=== Super Mario Kart ===
The Super Mario Kart depiction of Rainbow Road is the fifth and final course of the Special Cup, and the closing course of the game. It was remade in Mario Kart: Super Circuit and Mario Kart 7 as a retro track. The course appears in Mario Kart 8 as part of the Legend of Zelda x Mario Kart 8 DLC pack and in Mario Kart Tour.

=== Mario Kart 64 ===
The Rainbow Road featured in Mario Kart 64, inhabited by Chain Chomps, is the game's last track. Guardrails span the entire road, but it is still possible to fall or knock other racers off of the track, even allowing a significant shortcut near the starting line. The track is of extreme, "tedious" length. This version of Rainbow Road was later remade as a retro track in Mario Kart 8, where it is raced in only one lap due to its size.

=== Mario Kart: Super Circuit ===
The Rainbow Road featured in Mario Kart: Super Circuit takes place in outer space, with Bowser's Castle from Paper Mario clearly visible in the background. The course's guardrails are bouncy ramps, allowing drivers to make large shortcuts at certain parts with well-timed Mushroom boosts.

=== Mario Kart: Double Dash ===
The Rainbow Road featured in Mario Kart: Double Dash takes place above a city in the night sky. Its road features its colors in gradients, and is tiled and reflective. It features a vertical tube that shoots drivers high upwards, not unlike cannons.

=== Mario Kart DS ===
In Mario Kart DS, Rainbow Road is the fourth and final race of the Special Cup and the game's last new track. Set in outer space like the others, it has guardrails along most sections. Uniquely among Rainbow Road courses at the time, it includes a vertical loop and a twisting corkscrew, both lined with boost pads.

=== Mario Kart Wii ===
In Mario Kart Wii, the track is located above Earth's atmosphere, sending racers burning down toward the planet if they fall off. Wii Rainbow Road is heavily inspired by Super Mario Galaxy, as there are Star Bits floating throughout the track and the climax features a Launch Star that launches players upwards similar to the Mario Kart: Double Dash version. Wii Rainbow Road was later remade for Mario Kart Tour with mostly visual improvements and for Mario Kart 8 Deluxe, as part of the Booster Course Pass expansion pack, featuring its anti-gravity mechanic throughout the track.

=== Mario Kart 7 ===
The Rainbow Road featured in Mario Kart 7 is a long, three-sectioned course that takes place in outer space like previous incarnations, this time including portions on a planet ring and even on the moon. 3DS Rainbow Road was remade for Mario Kart Tour and Mario Kart 8 Deluxe. It was also featured as a stage in Super Smash Bros. for Nintendo 3DS.

=== Mario Kart 8 / Mario Kart 8 Deluxe ===
In Mario Kart 8 as well as Mario Kart 8 Deluxe, the track uses three whole laps again instead of lap sections, and there is again a planet in the background with a higher resolution than the one from Mario Kart Wii. This track is the first one to exploit the idea of gliding upon solar panels on a space station, giving a plausible explanation to the track's premise of a rainbow-colored track suspended in outer space. The ground uses quadratic tiles in resemblance to the original Rainbow Road (Super Mario Kart). At the start/finish line, the track crosses through a spacecraft filled with Toads who sit on tribunes as on a normal racetrack. Several more space ships carry parts of the track, most notably the one with two circular conveyor belt rotating rings in opposing directions which can speed up or slow down the vehicle that drives upon. As with other Mario Kart 8 tracks, Rainbow Road's surface is wildly twisted, forcing racers to make use of the new anti-gravity feature. At a location, two separated parts of the track cross nearby in different angles, and distant parts of the track can be seen ahead from far away. According to Mario Kart 8 Deluxe producer Kosuke Yabuki, the development team's goal was to create a version of Rainbow Road with a "near-future" aesthetic when anti-gravity controls were added.

=== Mario Kart Tour ===
Mario Kart Tour features two courses based on the original Rainbow Road from Super Mario Kart. Labeled as "remix courses" (abbreviated to "RMX courses"), these courses use a different layout compared to the original, and feature new mechanics, such as gliding and bouncy mushroom platforms. These courses are named RMX Rainbow Road 1 and 2, and share their music with the course they are based on.

=== The Super Mario Bros. Movie ===
The course makes an appearance in 2023's The Super Mario Bros. Movie as a celestial highway on which Mario, Princess Peach, Toad, Donkey Kong, and the Kong Army are pursued by Bowser's army. Mario battles the Koopas before he and Donkey Kong are thrown off the course by a Koopa General with a blue shell in a kamikaze attack, while Peach and Toad escape unharmed. When developing the film, directors Aaron Horvath and Michael Jelenic sought to recreate Rainbow Road's sense of danger and challenge as they described it as "The most unforgiving course in the series". The Rainbow Road scene in the film has been described as the most ambitious animation sequence that Illumination had undertaken compared to their previous films.

=== Mario Kart World ===
This version of the course introduced in Mario Kart World contains multiple sections. A prelude segment takes place in the Grand Prix where the racers drive from the previous track, Peach Stadium, flying up to Rainbow Road. The first is similar to other versions of Rainbow Road. The second section has the player "drive" across a river shrouded in clouds. The third section is very similar to Mario Kart 8's Rainbow Road, as the player drives through a large satellite. The final section of the track contains multiple elements from across the game, and ends with the player gliding into the finish line. GameSpot praised the design of the course as "a visual feast", calling this version of Rainbow Road "an all-time great".

== Cultural impact ==
Rainbow Road is referenced as a part of an Easter egg included in the programming of Tesla electric vehicles. According to Tesla CEO Elon Musk, once a Tesla car's autopilot mode is activated four times in quick succession, the gray road shown on the vehicle's instrument cluster would transform into a colorful path resembling Rainbow Road, with a cowbell tune playing in the background while this mode is turned on. In commemoration of Mario Day celebrations for 10 March 2021, Mattel produced a Hot Wheels Mario Kart track set based on the course on 24 June 2021.

To coincide with the 35th anniversary of Super Mario Bros., an ice cream cake inspired by the track was released by Cold Stone Creamery from 30 September to 15 December 2020.

Mario Kart: Bowser's Challenge, an augmented reality dark ride featured at Super Nintendo World at Universal Studios Japan, Universal Studios Hollywood, and Universal Epic Universe, takes riders through a variety of locations from Mario Kart 8, including Rainbow Road.

== Reception ==
Rainbow Road has received a generally positive attention for its memorable music and unique visuals, as well as notoriety for its length and challenging difficulty. Edge Magazine described Rainbow Road as "the deadly ribbon that has entranced generations of racers". Gus Turner from Complex described Rainbow Road as "simultaneously the most thrilling and most devastating level in any Mario Kart title". Rainbow Road has appeared in multiple "top" ranking lists of the best tracks in the history of the Mario Kart franchise compiled by video game critics, including Paste Magazine, Digital Spy, Screen Rant, and GameRevolution, and TheGamer.

The Rainbow Road levels in certain Mario Kart games have received particular attention. BuzzFeed News Reporter Joseph Bernstein ranked the Super Mario Kart version of Rainbow Road #15 on his list of the "34 Video Game Levels That You Must Play Before You Die". Reminiscing the Super Mario Kart version of Rainbow Road, A. V. Club staff said the overall experience was awe-inspiring in spite of its flawed design and frustrating level of difficulty. Its music has been praised by GamesRadar's Brett Elston as well as Dan Neilan from The A.V. Club, who called it as the "one redeeming quality" of a notoriously difficult track. Andrew Webster from The Verge praised the updated version of Rainbow Road for Mario Kart 8 as the best example of its "impressive new track design" and called it a vast improvement when compared to previous instalments. On 28 April 2017, Rainbow Road was voted as the best course in Mario Kart 8 Deluxe by UK players.

Not all reception towards Rainbow Road has been positive. Ben Lee of Digital Spy as well as several US Gamer staff members considered the Nintendo 64 version of Rainbow Road to be one of their least favorite tracks in the history of the Mario Kart franchise.
