= List of 2024 box office number-one films in Ecuador =

This is a list of films which placed number-one at the weekend box office in Ecuador during 2024.

== Number-one films ==
#	Weekend end date	Film	Box office	Openings in the top ten	Ref.
1	January 7, 2024	No box office data for the weekend of January 7 2024.			
2	January 14, 2024	No box office data for the weekend of January 14 2024.			
3	January 21, 2024	No box office data for the weekend of January 21 2024.			
4	January 28, 2024	No box office data for the weekend of January 28 2024.			
5	February 4, 2024	No box office data for the weekend of February 4 2024.			
6	February 11, 2024	No box office data for the weekend of February 11 2024.			
7	February 18, 2024	Argylle	$1,054		
8	February 25, 2024	No box office data for the weekend of February 25 2024.			
9	March 3, 2024	Argylle	$584		
10	March 10, 2024	Kung Fu Panda 4	$757,805		
11	March 17, 2024	Kung Fu Panda 4	$560,664		
12	March 24, 2024	One Life	$19,844		
13	March 31, 2024	Kung Fu Panda 4	$230,734		
14	April 7, 2024	One Life	$7,033		
15	April 14, 2024	One Life	$2,241		
16	April 21, 2024	One Life	$541		
17	April 28, 2024	The Fall Guy	$66,978		
18	May 5, 2024	The Fall Guy	$45,409		
19	May 12, 2024	The Fall Guy	$1,390		
20	May 19, 2024	The Fall Guy	$3,840		
21	May 26, 2024	No box office data for the weekend of May 26 2024.			
22	June 2, 2024	No box office data for the weekend of June 2 2024.			
23	June 9, 2024	No box office data for the weekend of June 9 2024.			
24	June 16, 2024	No box office data for the weekend of June 16 2024.			
25	June 23, 2024	No box office data for the weekend of June 23 2024.			
26	June 30, 2024	Despicable Me 4	$526,888		
27	July 7, 2024	No box office data for the weekend of July 7 2024.			
28	July 14, 2024	Despicable Me 4	$248,048	MaXXXine #2	
29	July 21, 2024	Despicable Me 4	$174,438		
30	July 28, 2024	Despicable Me 4	$121,323		
31	August 4, 2024	Despicable Me 4	$88,733		
32	August 11, 2024	Despicable Me 4	$97,498		
33	August 18, 2024	Despicable Me 4	$42,639		
34	August 25, 2024	Despicable Me 4	$25,493	The Crow #2	
35	September 1, 2024	The Forge	$21,752		
36	September 8, 2024	The Forge	$12,961		
37	September 15, 2024	Speak No Evil	$42,813		
38	September 22, 2024	Speak No Evil	$31,069		
39	September 29, 2024	The Wild Robot	$172,271	Never Let Go #2	
40	October 6, 2024	The Wild Robot	$166,417		
41	October 13, 2024	The Wild Robot	$291,649		
42	October 20, 2024	The Wild Robot	$232,646		
43	October 27, 2024	No box office data for the weekend of October 27 2024.			
44	November 3, 2024	Longlegs	$56,271		
45	November 10, 2024	The Wild Robot	$110,957		
46	November 17, 2024	The Wild Robot	$84,335		
47	November 24, 2024	Wicked	$171,839		
48	December 1, 2024	Wicked	$56,376		
49	December 8, 2024	Longlegs	$56,271		
50	December 15, 2024	No box office data for the weekend of December 15 2024.			
51	December 22, 2024	No box office data for the weekend of December 22 2024.			
52	December 29, 2024	Wicked	$1,513		

== See also ==
- 2024 in Ecuador

Preceded by 2023 Box office number-one films	Box office number-one films 2024	Succeeded by 2025 Box office number-one films
