= Blue shell =

Power-up in the Mario Kart series

- Mario Kart element
- A blue shell as it appears in Mario Kart 8
- Publisher: Nintendo
- First appearance: Mario Kart 64 (1996)
- Genre: Kart racing game

In-universe information
- Type: Power-up
- Traits and abilities: Offensive item

The blue shell, officially known as the Spiny Shell, is a power-up item in the Mario Kart video game series. Originating in Mario Kart 64 (1996) and featured in every main entry of the series since then, the blue shell, when used, aims directly at the racer in first place, stopping them on impact. The blue shell acts as a "catch-up" mechanic, with racers ranked towards the bottom having a better chance of it spawning when driving into item boxes, giving them a better chance at diminishing the lead of the racer in top position. In addition to the Mario Kart series, the blue shell appeared in the Super Smash Bros. series and in Mario Hoops 3-on-3. A character based on the item appears in the 2023 film The Super Mario Bros. Movie, voiced by Scott Menville.

Initially, in Mario Kart 64, the blue shell was impossible to stop or dodge once fired. This was changed in Mario Kart: Super Circuit (2001), and subsequent games allowed ways for the targeted racer to do so, albeit only with combinations of precise timing and specific items, most commonly with a Mushroom. As it is likely to spawn at least once during a race, the power-up item has earned a reputation of frequently destroying a player's lead, or suddenly ruining their chances of winning, especially when it happens right at the end of a race. Because of this, the blue shell has largely come to be seen as one of the best and most famous, yet also one of the most frustrating items in video game history.

== History ==
The Super Mario series features some visually similar figures which pre-date the blue shell, such as the red Spinies from the original Super Mario Bros. (1985) and blue Koopa Troopas from Super Mario World (1990).

In Mario Kart 64, racers in 4th–8th place can obtain the blue shell. Since the release of Mario Kart: Double Dash, the series sees the blue shell being more common to characters closer to the lead (if the leader pulls away from the rest of the pack). In releases after Mario Kart: Super Circuit and prior to Mario Kart 7, it is unable to hit characters on its way to the lead, as it flies above the track using wings rather than gliding upon its surface.

There are few techniques possible in some Mario Kart games to evade the blue shell, such as using a timed boost from a Mushroom item in Mario Kart DS onwards. In Mario Kart 8, Mario Kart 8 Deluxe, Mario Kart Tour, and Mario Kart World, it is possible to use the new Super Horn item to destroy blue shells. A toy model of the blue shell is included in the limited edition package of Mario Kart 8. A blue-shelled Koopa General (voiced by Scott Menville) appears in the 2023 film The Super Mario Bros. Movie, obliterating much of the film's depiction of Rainbow Road after shouting "Blue shell!" as a battlecry.

== Development ==
In a 2011 interview with Kotaku, Hideki Konno, who directed Super Mario Kart and Mario Kart 64, was asked about the blue shell's inclusion in the series. He stated that it was introduced in Mario Kart 64 to keep players together due to the limited processing power of the Nintendo 64 and that "we wanted to create a race where everyone was in it until the end". In a 2017 interview with Eurogamer, Kosuke Yabuki, the director of Mario Kart 7 and Mario Kart 8, said that Nintendo has experimented with removing the blue shell from the games, but "it feels like something's missing. Like there's something not quite enough in the game. So for now we've kept it in."

== Reception ==
Alex Langley's The Geek Handbook names being hit by the blue shell shortly before reaching the finish line as one of Mario Kart 8's greatest frustrations. David Murphy from PCMag and Jamie Andrew from Den of Geek both called the Blue Shell the “Blue Shell of Death”. In 2017, Keith Stuart of The Guardian included the blue shell as one of the "11 greatest video game objects" in history, calling it "the most controversial item in the Mario universe."

Calling it "The Great Equalizer" for its enhancement of the elements of struggle and luck, Kotaku's Nathan Grayson considered the blue shell to be the most despised, and best, item of the Mario Kart series. Kotaku's Yannick Le Jacq considered the blue shell to be the most notable and game-changing among Mario Kart's "most notorious" items, adding that this made it "a lot more fun" to use in Super Smash Bros. for 3DS and Wii U too.

Nintendo Power called the use of a Mushroom to dodge a blue shell a "defining moment" of gameplay in Mario Kart Wii. Maxwell McGee of GameSpot considered the ability to destroy the "dreaded" blue shells with a new item, the Super Horn, to be a particularly exciting feature of Mario Kart 8. Steve Watts of GameSpot said in 2022 that "the Blue Shell has become synonymous with Mario Kart" and is now an icon within video game history.
