= The Super Mario Bros. Movie =

2023 American animated film

- Theatrical release poster
- Directed by: Aaron Horvath; Michael Jelenic
- Written by: Matthew Fogel
- Based on: Mario by Nintendo
- Produced by: Chris Meledandri; Shigeru Miyamoto
- Starring: Chris Pratt; Anya Taylor-Joy; Charlie Day; Jack Black; Keegan-Michael Key; Seth Rogen; Fred Armisen
- Edited by: Eric Osmond
- Music by: Brian Tyler (Note: Original Nintendo themes by Koji Kondo.)
- Production companies: Illumination; Nintendo
- Distributed by: Universal Pictures
- Release dates: April 1, 2023 (Regal LA Live); April 5, 2023 (United States)
- Running time: 92 minutes
- Country: United States
- Language: English
- Budget: $100 million
- Box office: $1.361 billion

The Super Mario Bros. Movie is a 2023 American animated adventure comedy film based on Nintendo's Mario video game franchise. Directed by Aaron Horvath and Michael Jelenic and written by Matthew Fogel, the film stars an ensemble voice cast led by Chris Pratt, Anya Taylor-Joy, Charlie Day, Jack Black, Keegan-Michael Key, Seth Rogen, and Fred Armisen. It was produced by Universal Pictures, Illumination and Nintendo. The film follows brothers Mario (Pratt) and Luigi (Day), two Italian-American plumbers who get separated after being transported to another world and become entangled in a war between the Mushroom Kingdom, led by Princess Peach (Taylor-Joy), and the Dark Lands, led by the King of the Koopas, Bowser (Black).

As a result of the critical and commercial failure of the live-action film Super Mario Bros. (1993), Nintendo became reluctant to license its intellectual properties for film adaptations. Despite this, Mario creator Shigeru Miyamoto became interested in developing another film during the development of the Virtual Console service. Through Nintendo's work with Universal Parks & Resorts to create Super Nintendo World, he met with Illumination CEO Chris Meledandri. By 2016, they were discussing a Mario film and, in January 2018, Nintendo announced that they would produce it with Illumination and Universal. Production was underway by 2020, and the cast was announced in September 2021.

The Super Mario Bros. Movie premiered at Regal LA Live on April 1, 2023, and was released in the United States on April 5 by Universal Pictures. The film received mixed reviews from critics, and grossed $1.360 billion worldwide, breaking multiple box-office records, including becoming the highest-grossing film based on a video game and the first film based on a video game to reach the billion-dollar mark. It finished its theatrical run as the second-highest-grossing film of 2023, the third-highest-grossing animated film, the 15th-highest-grossing film of all time, and the highest-grossing film produced by Illumination. At the 81st Golden Globe Awards, the film received nominations for Best Animated Feature Film, Best Original Song, and Cinematic Box Office Achievement, a category introduced at the same ceremony. A sequel, The Super Mario Galaxy Movie, was released in 2026.

== Plot ==
Italian-American brothers Mario and Luigi operate a struggling plumbing business in Brooklyn, to the derision of their ex-foreman Spike and the disapproval of their father. After seeing a significant water main leak on the news, Mario and Luigi go to the sewer to fix it, but are sucked into a Warp Pipe and separated.

Mario lands in the Mushroom Kingdom, ruled by Princess Peach, while Luigi arrives in the Dark Lands, ruled by the evil Koopa king Bowser, who seeks to marry Peach and will destroy the Mushroom Kingdom using a Super Star if she refuses. Seeing Mario as competition for Peach's love, Bowser imprisons Luigi to threaten him. Mario meets Toad, who takes him to Peach. Peach plans to ally with the primate family of Kongs to help defeat Bowser, and trains Mario before allowing him and Toad to travel along. During their journey, she tells Mario that she ended up in the Mushroom Kingdom as a baby, where the Toads took her in and eventually made her their leader. In the Jungle Kingdom, King Cranky Kong agrees to help if Mario defeats his son, Donkey Kong, in a fight. Despite initially being overpowered by Donkey Kong's strength, Mario defeats him using a Cat Suit.

Mario, Peach, Toad, and the Kong royal family use go-karts (Note: Go-karts seen in the film originate from the Mario Kart series.) to drive back to the Mushroom Kingdom, where Bowser's army ambushes them on Rainbow Road. When a blue-shelled Koopa General destroys part of the road, Mario and Donkey Kong plummet into the ocean while the other Kongs are captured. Peach and Toad return to the Mushroom Kingdom and urge the citizens to evacuate. Bowser arrives aboard his flying castle and proposes to Peach, who reluctantly accepts after Bowser's advisor Kamek tortures Toad with magic. Mario and Donkey Kong, having been swallowed by a giant eel, learn they both want the respect of their fathers. They escape the eel by riding a rocket barrel from Donkey Kong's kart and hurry to Bowser and Peach's wedding.

At the wedding ceremony, Bowser intends to sacrifice all of his prisoners, including Luigi and the Kongs, in Peach's honor. Toad smuggles an Ice Flower into Peach's bouquet, which she uses to freeze both Bowser and the chain lowering the prisoners into the lava. Mario and Donkey Kong fight their way through Bowser's army and free the prisoners, with Mario using a Tanooki Suit to save Luigi. Bowser frees himself and launches a Bomber Bill to destroy the Mushroom Kingdom, but Mario knocks it off-course and directs it into the Warp Pipe where it detonates, creating a vacuum that sucks Bowser's castle and its occupants into Brooklyn.

Upon being vacuumed into Brooklyn, Mario attempts to grab the Star but the enraged Bowser violently beats him up in the process; he also attacks and defeats Peach, Toad, and Donkey Kong. Mario sees his business' commercial on a television and is motivated to face Bowser, who almost incinerates him. Luigi uses a manhole cover to save Mario, and they both grab the Super Star. Becoming temporarily invincible, they defeat the army, destroy Bowser's castle, and incapacitate him. Peach shrinks Bowser with a blue Mini Mushroom before Toad imprisons him in a jar. Mario and Luigi are hailed as heroes by Brooklyn's populace, including their parents and Spike, and bid their farewell to Donkey Kong before moving into a house in the Mushroom Kingdom. Sometime later, the Mario brothers begin a day of plumbing work together.

== Voice cast ==
- Chris Pratt as Mario, a struggling Italian-American plumber from Brooklyn, New York City
- Anya Taylor-Joy as Princess Peach, the leader of the Mushroom Kingdom
- Charlie Day as Luigi, Mario's timid younger and taller twin brother and fellow plumber
- Jack Black as Bowser, the King of the Koopas, who leads the Dark Lands and Mario's arch-nemesis
- Keegan-Michael Key as Toad, a resident of the Mushroom Kingdom
- Seth Rogen as Donkey Kong, the heir to the throne of the Jungle Kingdom
- Fred Armisen as Cranky Kong, the king of the Jungle Kingdom, and Donkey Kong's father
- Sebastian Maniscalco as Spike, Mario and Luigi's ex-boss, who owns a company called Wrecking Crew. Maniscalco originally auditioned to voice Mario, impersonating his game voice, hoping that an actor of Italian heritage could portray the character. He was given this smaller role as compensation.
- Kevin Michael Richardson as Kamek, a Magikoopa serving as Bowser's advisor and informant

Additionally, Charles Martinet—who voiced both Mario and Luigi in the Mario games from 1994 to 2023 (Note: Martinet was first cast as the voice of Mario in 1991 for interactive attractions at Nintendo trade shows. His first official role in the Mario games was as Mario in 1994's Mario Teaches Typing. Martinet first voiced Luigi in the games in the North American and European—but not Japanese—releases of Mario Kart 64 in 1997.)—voices the brothers' father; and Giuseppe, a Brooklyn citizen who resembles Mario's original appearance in Donkey Kong and speaks in his in-game voice. Jessica DiCicco voices the brothers' mother, the plumbing commercial woman, Mayor Pauline, a yellow Toad, baby Luigi's bully, and baby Peach. Rino Romano and John DiMaggio voice the brothers' uncles, Tony and Arthur, respectively. Khary Payton voices the Penguin King, the ruler of the Snow Kingdom, which Bowser's army attacks; while Eric Bauza voices the Toad General and the Sports Coat Kong. Juliet Jelenic, daughter of co-director Michael Jelenic, voices Lumalee, a nihilistic blue Luma held prisoner by Bowser. Scott Menville voices the Koopa General, the winged, blue-shelled leader of Bowser's army, a red Toad, and a Koopa Troopa who is turned into a Dry Bones.

== Production ==
=== Development ===
After the critical and commercial failure of the 1993 Super Mario Bros. film adaptation, the Japanese video game company Nintendo became wary of licensing its properties for film adaptations. According to Shigeru Miyamoto, the creator of Mario, the idea for a new Mario film came from bringing their older games to the Virtual Console and other services. Such transitions took time for the company, and Miyamoto recognized that "our content business would be able to develop even further if we were able to combine our long-beloved software with that of video assets, and use them together for extended periods". Miyamoto knew that the process of making a film was far different from that of making a video game, and wanted a film expert to lead the effort.

Following the November 2014 hack of Sony Pictures, emails between producer Avi Arad, studio chief Amy Pascal, TriStar Pictures head Tom Rothman, and Sony Pictures Animation president of production Michelle Raimo Kouyate were released, revealing that Sony had been attempting to secure the film rights to the Mario franchise for several years. Arad visited Nintendo in Tokyo in February and July 2014 in an attempt to secure a deal. In October, Arad emailed Pascal and said he had closed the deal with Nintendo. Pascal suggested recruiting Genndy Tartakovsky, director of Sony Pictures Animation's Hotel Transylvania (2012), to help develop the project, while Kouyate said she could "think of 3–4 movies right out of the gate" and hoped to build a "Mario empire". However, after the emails leaked, Arad denied that a deal had been made, stating that negotiations had only begun. BuzzFeed News noted that the emails did not take into account potential conflicts with Sony Pictures' corporate sibling Sony Interactive Entertainment, one of Nintendo's chief competitors.

Through Nintendo's work with Universal Parks & Resorts to create Mario-based attractions, later resulting in Super Nintendo World, Miyamoto met Chris Meledandri, founder of Universal Pictures' Illumination animation division. Miyamoto found Meledandri's creative process similar to his own and felt he would be the proper lead for a Mario film. They had started more earnest discussions by 2016, knowing that if they felt it would not work, they could easily walk away. In November 2017, reports emerged that Nintendo was collaborating with Universal and Illumination to make an animated Mario film. Then-Nintendo president Tatsumi Kimishima clarified that a deal had not been finalized, but that an announcement would come soon. Kimishima hoped that if the deal were successful, a 2020 release date would be possible.

In January 2018, Nintendo announced that the film would progress with Miyamoto and Meledandri co-producing. Meledandri said the film was a "priority" for Illumination and that it would most likely come out in 2022. He added that Miyamoto would be "front and center" during production. In January 2020, Nintendo president Shuntaro Furukawa stated that the film was "moving along smoothly" with an expected 2022 release date. Furukawa also said Nintendo would own the rights to the film, and both Nintendo and Universal would fund the production.

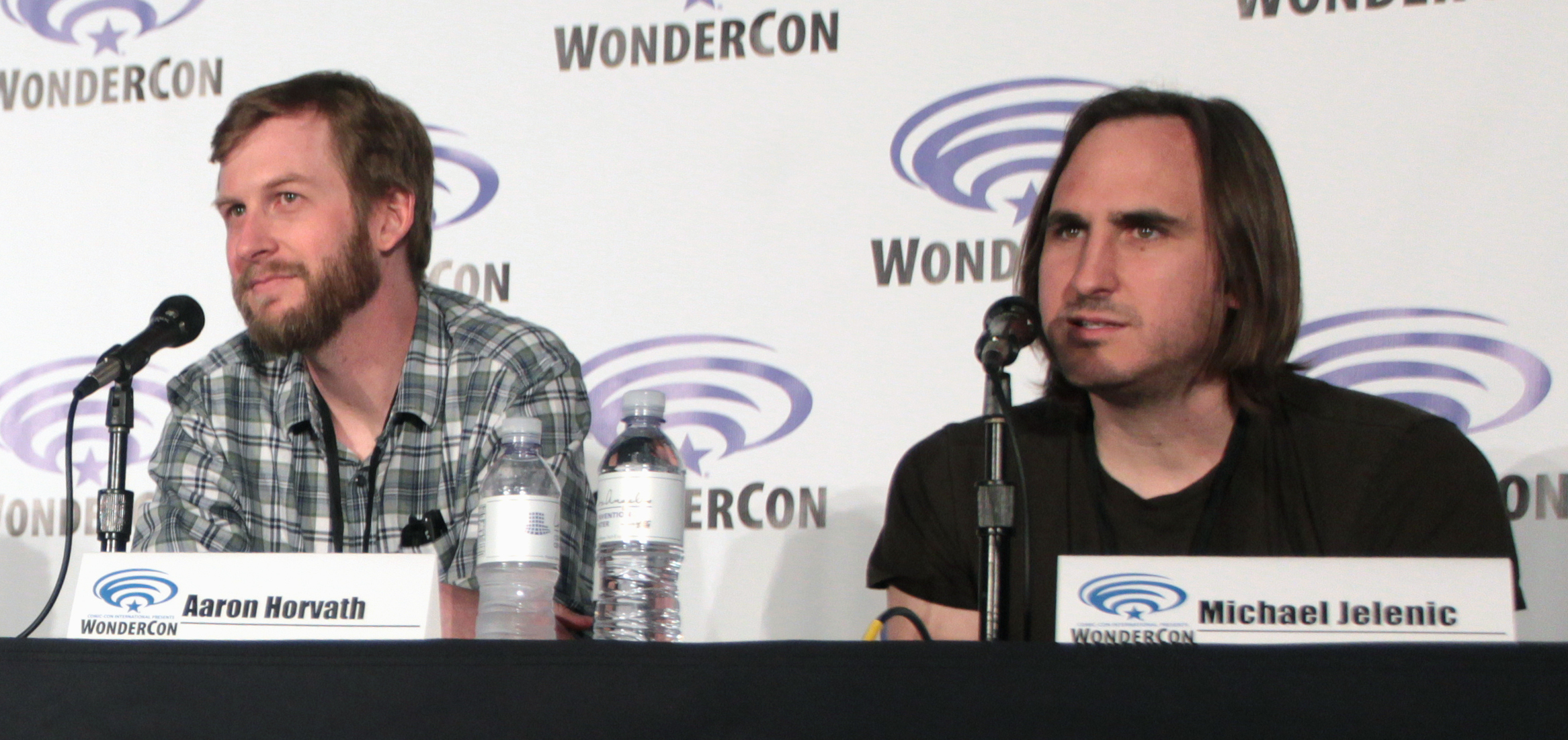
Directors Aaron Horvath (left) and Michael Jelenic (right)

In August 2021, it emerged that Teen Titans Go! creators Aaron Horvath and Michael Jelenic were directing the film after the discovery of an Illumination animator's LinkedIn profile that included the film in their list. Following the full casting announcement, Horvath and Jelenic were confirmed to be directing, with Matthew Fogel attached as the screenwriter after previously writing Illumination's Minions: The Rise of Gru (2022). According to Khary Payton, who has collaborated with Horvath and Jelenic on various projects at Warner Bros. Animation, the duo flew to Illumination Studios Paris a month after the release of their first feature film, Teen Titans Go! To the Movies, in September 2018.

In September 2022, it was announced by New York Comic Con that the film's teaser trailer would be released on October 6, 2022; the teaser formally revealed the film's title, The Super Mario Bros. Movie.

=== Writing ===
Jelenic and Horvath wanted their work on the film to be the opposite of the "irreverent" Teen Titans Go!, aiming to develop a faithful adaptation of the games, which they both felt had not been done before, as well as something "more cinematic" and "more emotional" than Teen Titans Go!. "When people probably first heard our names attached to the movie, they expected we'd do the Teen Titans Go! treatment to Mario", said Jelenic. "But every project we come to, we make new choices depending on who the audience is and what we're going for". Horvath asserted that Nintendo involved themselves with every aspect of the production, "from story to visual development to the animation".

The duo wanted the film to serve as an "origin story" for Mario and Luigi, opting to portray them as "blue-collar guys" by focusing on their previous backgrounds as Italian-American plumbers from New York City in early games (specifically Brooklyn, as in older American media). The duo chose to interchange Princess Peach's and Luigi's roles from the games, with Peach helping Mario rescue a kidnapped Luigi, because they felt having them in their original roles was "too straightforward". The duo drew inspiration from Super Mario 3D World (2013) and its portrayal of Peach as a playable character, stating they wanted to focus on her role as the Mushroom Kingdom's monarch and "how strong that person would need to be to protect [the Toads]". For Bowser, they "decided to make that character scary, but the other side of Bowser is somebody who's vulnerable and funny". Yoshi was planned to appear in the film, but appears in a post-credits scene as an Easter egg.

=== Casting ===
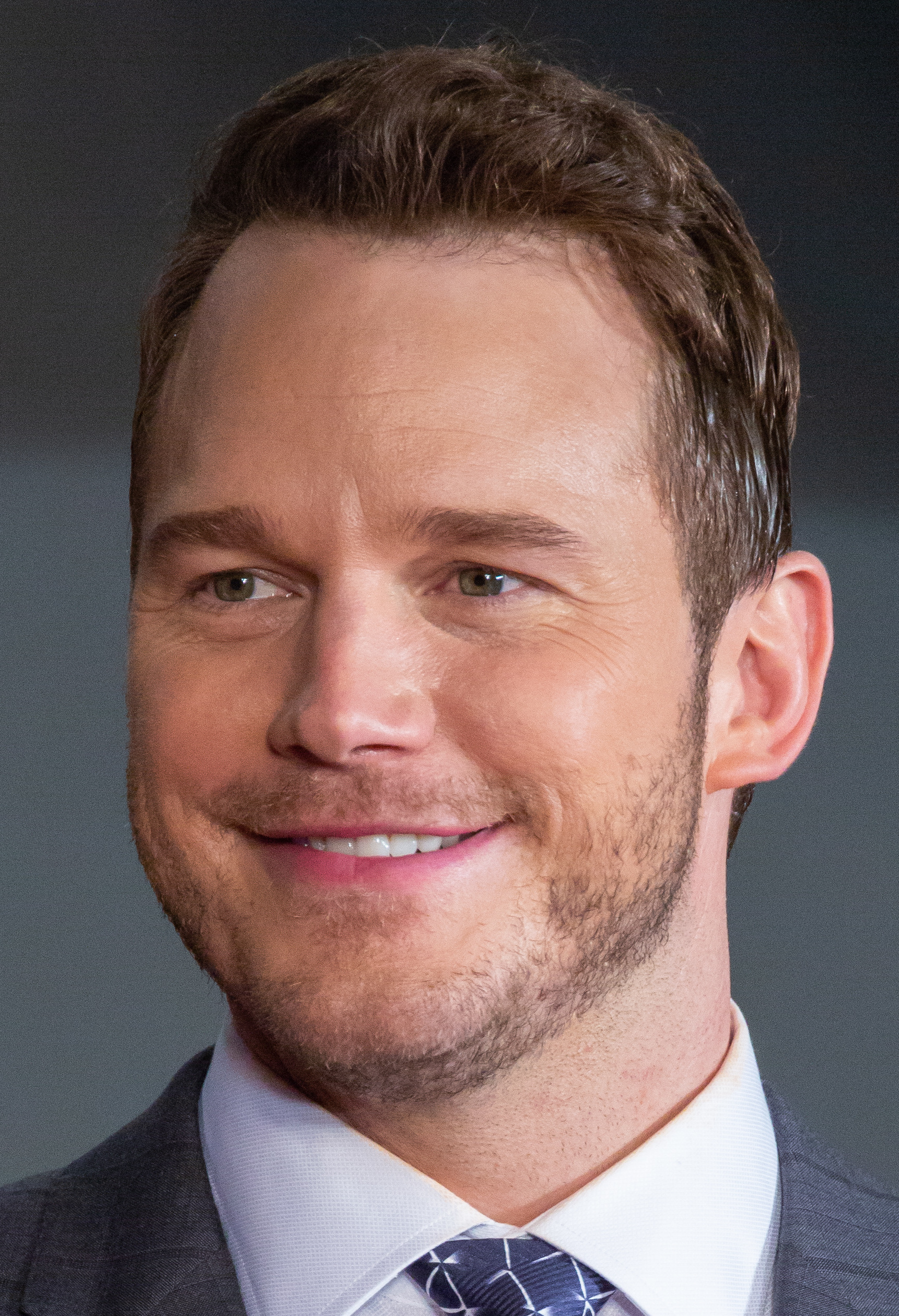
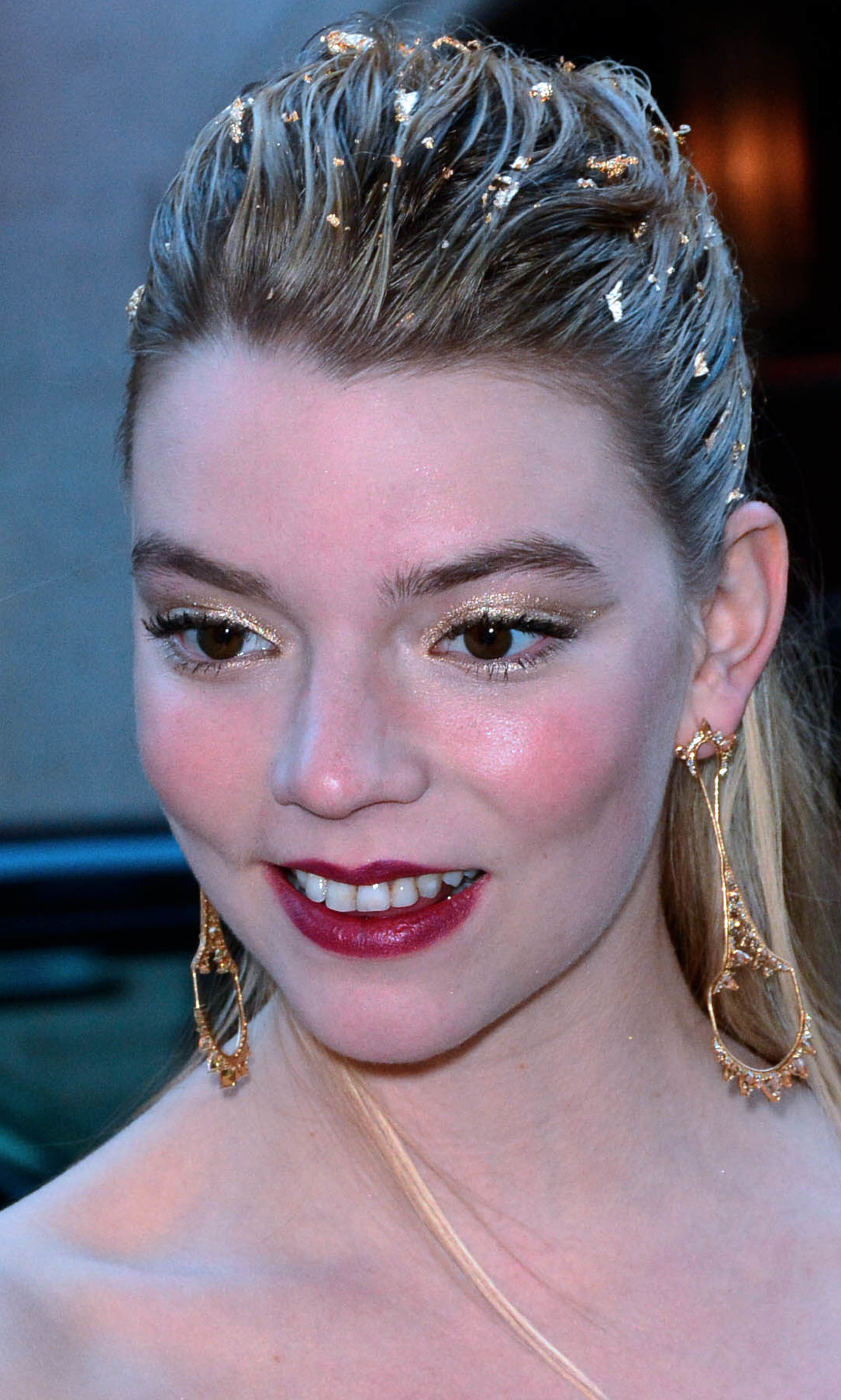
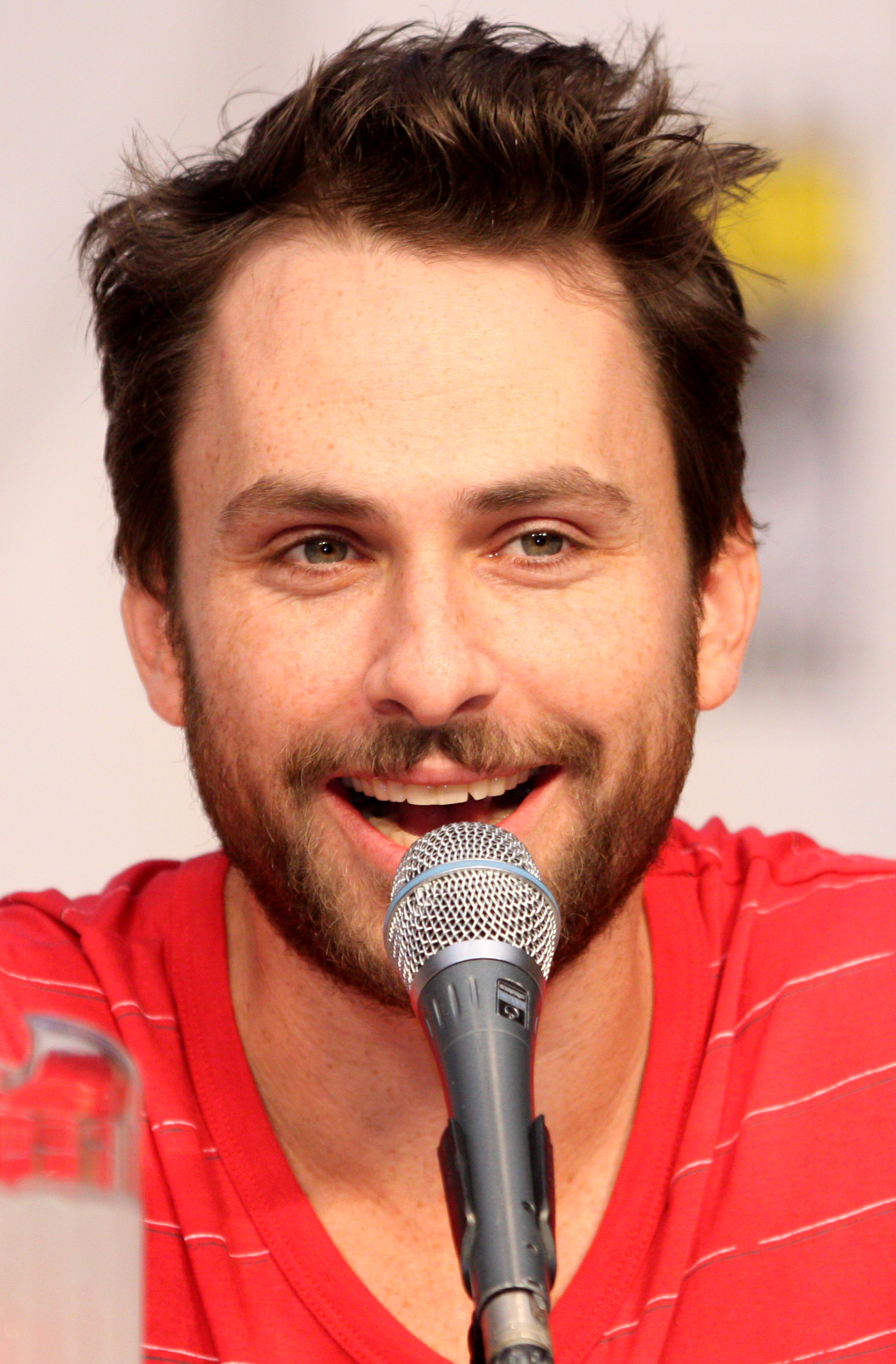
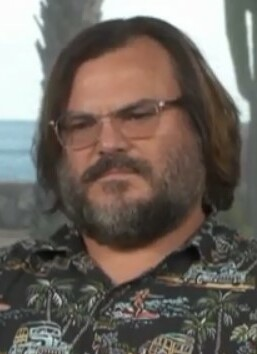
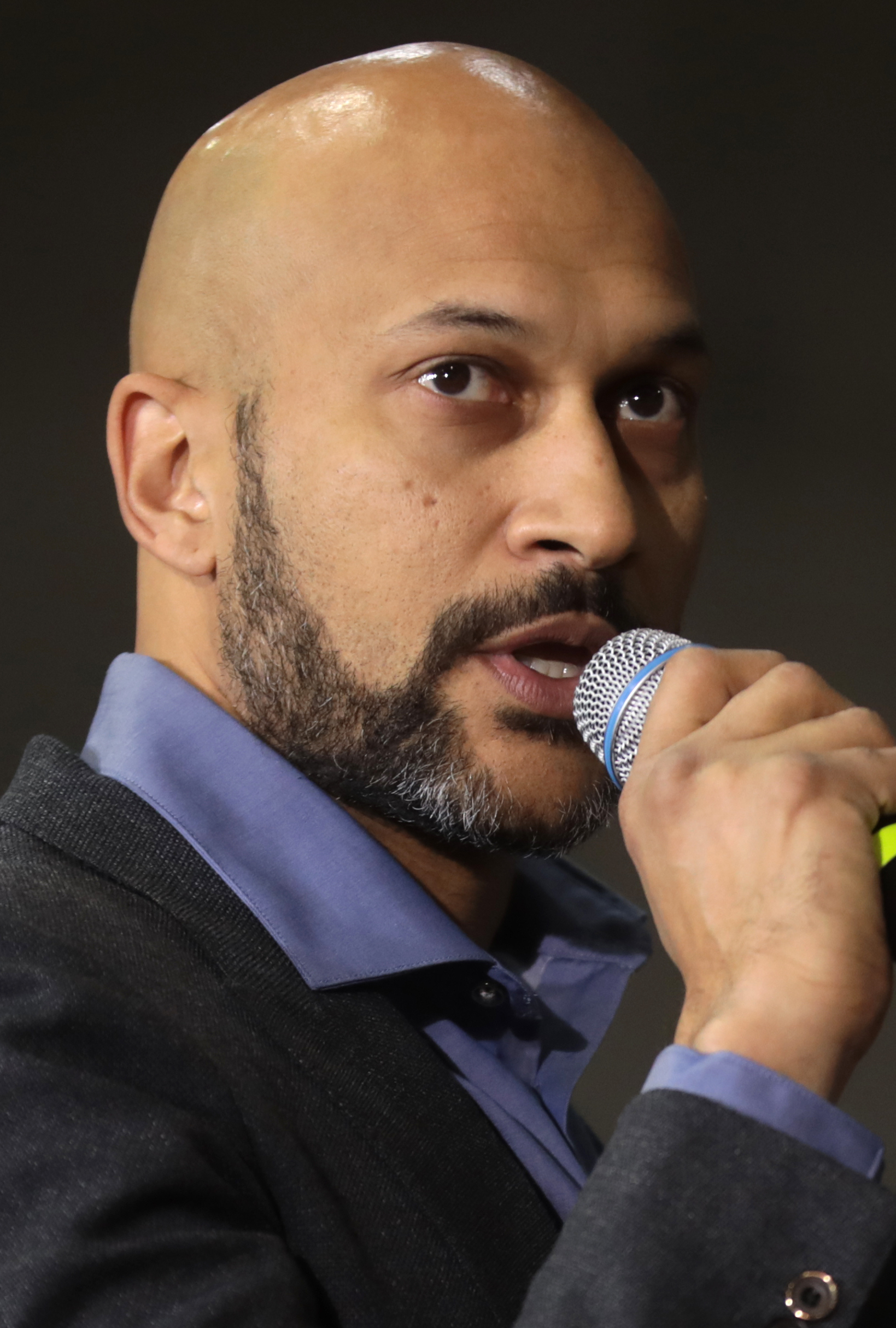
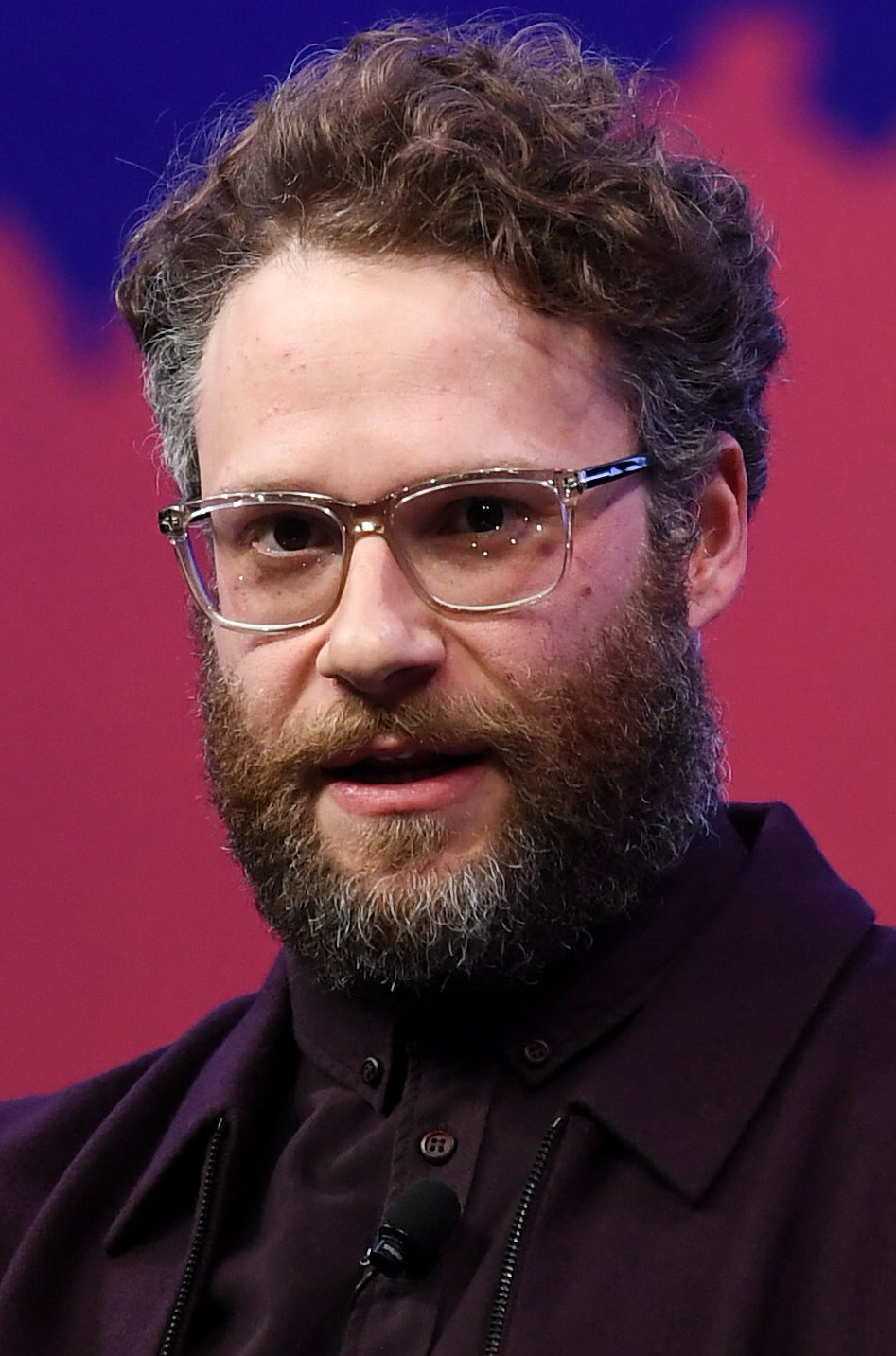
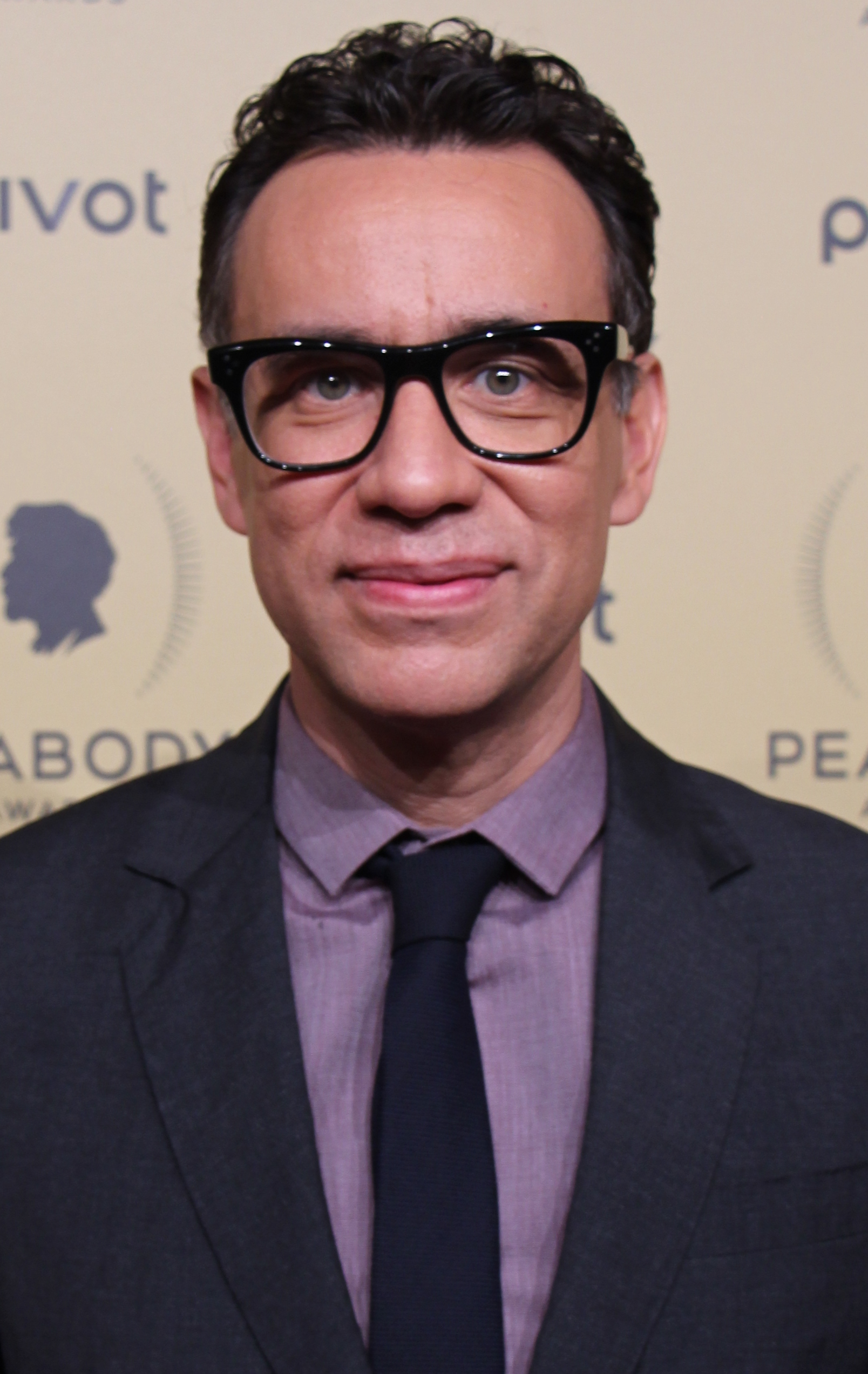
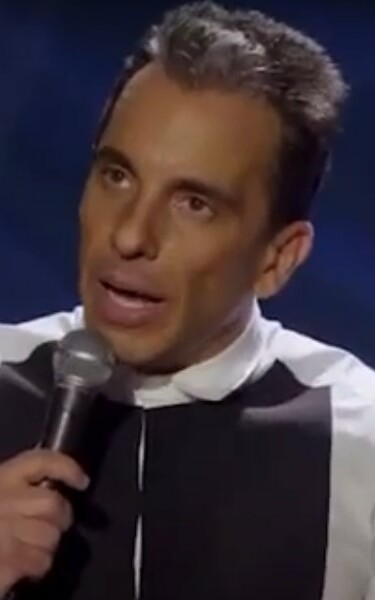
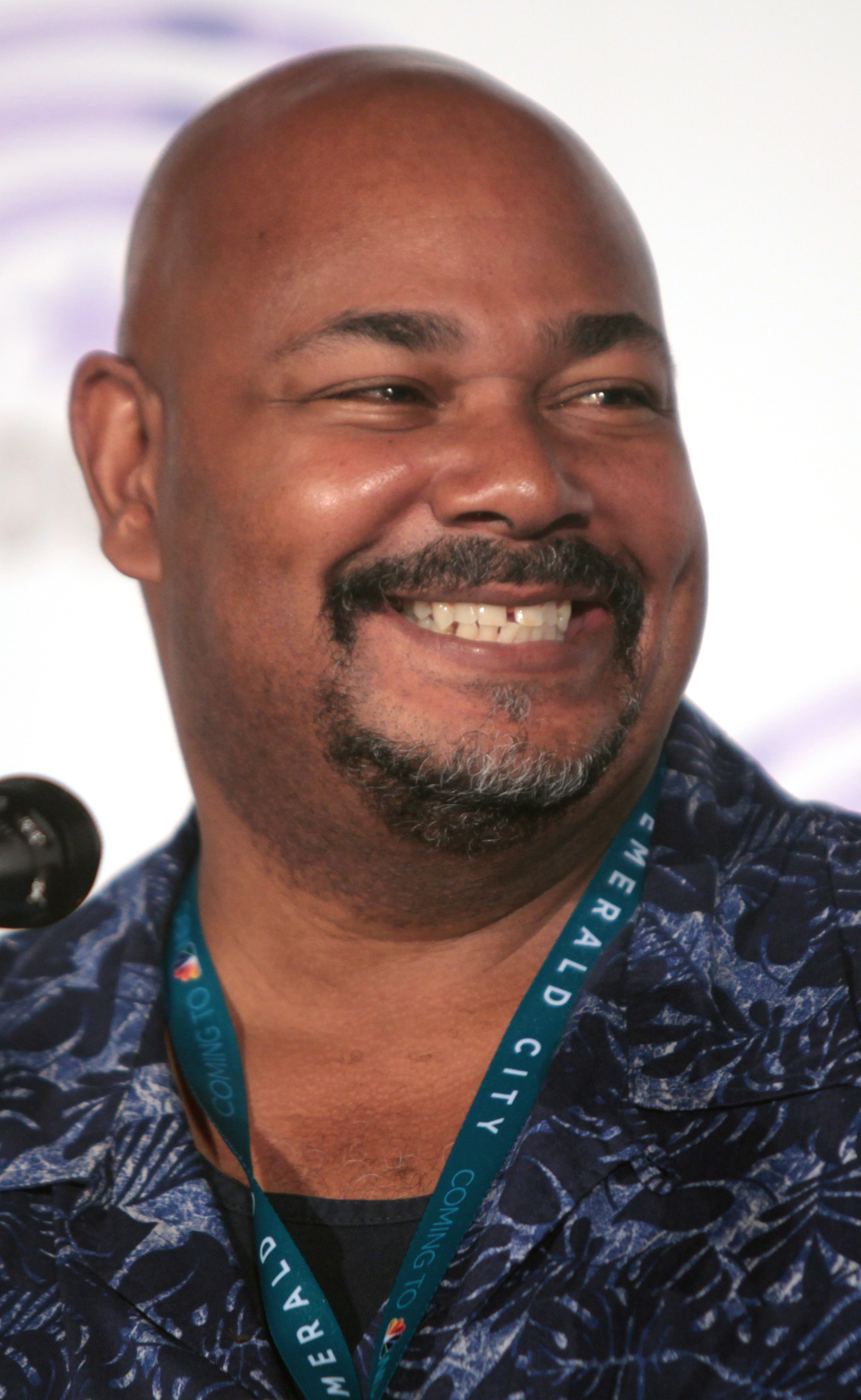
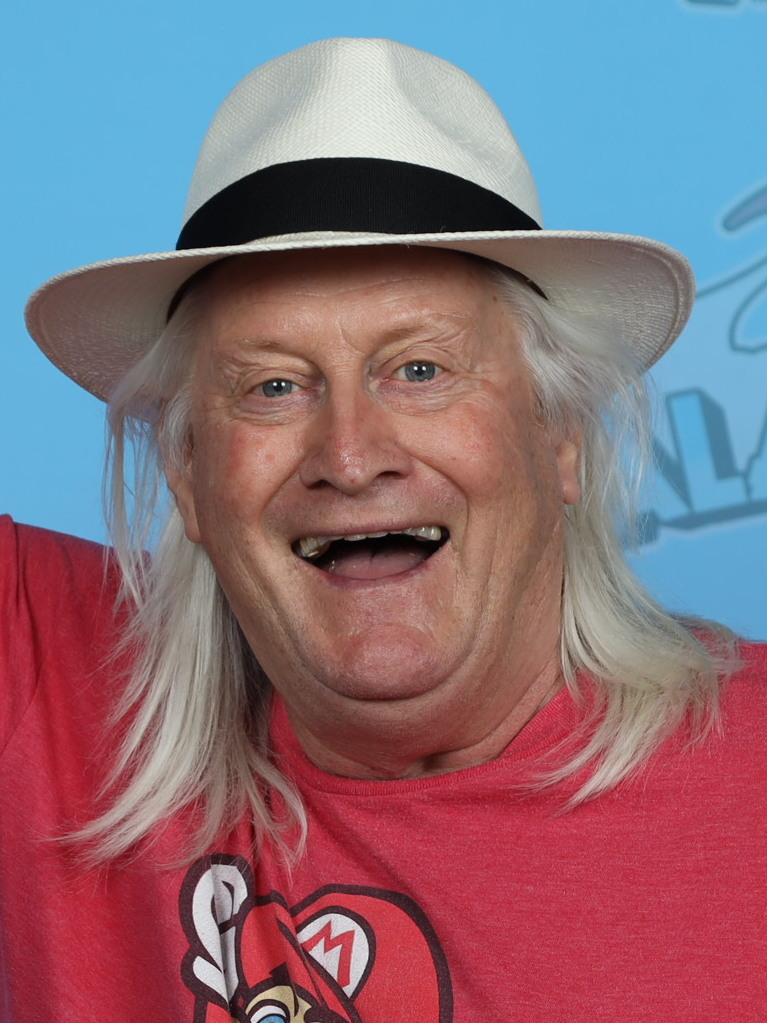
Top: Chris Pratt, Anya Taylor-Joy, and Charlie Day provide the voices for Mario, Princess Peach, and Luigi.

Middle: Jack Black, Keegan-Michael Key, and Seth Rogen voice Bowser, Toad, and Donkey Kong.

Bottom: Fred Armisen, Sebastian Maniscalco, and Kevin Michael Richardson voice Cranky Kong, Spike, and Kamek, while Charles Martinet cameos as the brothers' father and a citizen of Brooklyn named Giuseppe.

In February 2021, Mario voice actor Charles Martinet said the possibility of reprising his role in the film would be a "marvelous thing" and that if he were asked to voice Mario he would "go in and play with great joy and happiness". In August 2021, Sebastian Maniscalco revealed he was voicing Spike, Mario and Luigi's boss from the game Wrecking Crew (1985).

During a September 2021 Nintendo Direct presentation, Shigeru Miyamoto announced that Chris Pratt, Anya Taylor-Joy, Charlie Day, Jack Black, Keegan-Michael Key, Seth Rogen, Kevin Michael Richardson, Fred Armisen, and Maniscalco would headline the voice cast and that Martinet would be featured in "surprise cameos". The announcement was met with a mixed reaction from fans; while some welcomed the idea of celebrity actors voicing the characters, others questioned and criticized the choices, in particular Pratt as Mario instead of Martinet (who had voiced the character since 1991) or an Italian actor. Martinet voices the brothers' father as well as a citizen of Brooklyn named Giuseppe, the former using Martinet's initial tough Italian-American voice for Mario and the latter using Mario's game voice. Additionally, voice acting veterans Rino Romano, John DiMaggio, and Jessica DiCicco voiced Mario and Luigi's uncles Tony and Arthur, and mother, respectively, as the intention was to cast actors of Italian ancestry for the brothers' family. The casting choices led to widespread internet memes surrounding the movie.

Meledandri said Pratt would not be voicing Mario in a thick Italian accent as Martinet had traditionally done. Voice actor Khary Payton described Pratt's original voice during production as a "New York, Italian guy" and a "cousin to the Sopranos", but the accent was scrapped for sounding too similar to the character Tony Soprano. Voice actress Tara Strong criticized Pratt's casting and expressed a preference for Martinet to voice Mario instead, lamenting what she described to be Hollywood's disregard for professional voice actors. In response to criticism of Pratt's casting, Horvath stated, "For us, it made total sense. He's really good at playing a blue-collar hero with a ton of heart. For the way that Mario is characterized in our film, he's perfect for it."

Charlie Day originally wanted to voice Luigi with a New York accent similar to the film Goodfellas (1990). The accent was scrapped when the directors told him it sounded too similar to the gangster film, to which Day responded to the change with, "Alright! I think you're wrong, but fine!" Plot details were kept secret from the actors during recording, according to Day, who noted he had to record his dialogue in many different ways, after which the directors selected the version they believed would be best suited for the film.

Upon the trailer's release, both Payton and Eric Bauza confirmed their parts in the film; Payton voices the Penguin King and Bauza voices the Toad General. During the COVID-19 pandemic, Payton recorded his lines in a closet at his home, though he was unsure if he would appear in the final cut. Bauza also voiced Diddy Kong, who originally had a longer scene, and the Sports Coat Kong, and originally recorded some vocal effects for Yoshi alongside two other actors, which went unused in favor of an archive recording of Yoshi's voice actor Kazumi Totaka from the games.

In response to backlash for voicing Donkey Kong in his normal speaking voice, Rogen explained: "I was very clear that I don't do voices" and "If you want me to be in this movie, then it's going to sound like me and that's it. That was the beginning and end of that conversation." He added further, "I think in the film and in the game, all you seem to know about Donkey Kong is that he throws barrels and does not like Mario very much. And that's what I ran with."

=== Animation and design ===
The film was animated by Illumination Studios Paris in Paris, France. Production was underway by September 2020, with animation ending in October 2022. Jelenic and Horvath wanted the animation to juggle stylized animation with realism, with Horvath claiming that "there are moments of cartoony fun, but [...] we wanted it to feel like a big adventure film and that there are stakes and maybe you believe that these characters can die, so they're not super-squashy and super-stretchy, and we used consistent volume on the characters to make them feel a little more grounded". For the go-karts featured in the film, the directors worked with a vehicle design artist and a team at Nintendo to create go-karts that fit their portrayal in the film while drawing inspiration from their portrayal in the Mario Kart games, particularly Rainbow Road.

In an interview with GameSpot, Horvath said that he and Jelenic took a "blockbuster approach" when directing the film's action sequences, "consider[ing] Mario [to be] more of an action game. [...] So we wanted to reflect that action sensibility [sic]." The pair brought in artists they had previously worked with from their television background, and credited head of story Ed Skudder with storyboarding the Rainbow Road sequence, which they also described as the film's most technically challenging. The road itself was a visual effect, and every shot of it had to go through the visual effects department, which was time-consuming and expensive. Donkey Kong's design was changed for the first time since the video game Donkey Kong Country (1994); the new design was influenced by the character's redesign in Donkey Kong Bananza (2025), which was in development during the film's production. For Mario's family, Horvath and Jelenic were given early designs of Mario by Nintendo as references; they ended up using slightly altered versions of those designs in the film.

Jason Hanel, senior colorist at Company 3, fine-tuned The Super Mario Bros. Movie's visuals using DaVinci Resolve. While Illumination's animation already controlled lighting and color, Hanel made final scene-by-scene adjustments to enhance realism and maintain consistency. He adjusted skin tones, clothing, and environments to counter unintended shifts from digital lighting. The transition from Brooklyn's realism to the Mushroom Kingdom's fantasy was refined through color grading, with effects like digital lens flares and atmospheric lighting reinforcing a cinematic feel. The Dark Lands' shadows and black levels were finalized in post-production to achieve the intended eerie tone.

== Music ==
During an October 2022 Nintendo Direct presentation, Meledandri confirmed that Brian Tyler was set to compose the film's score. Tyler worked closely with longtime Mario composer Koji Kondo to incorporate themes from the games. He described the composition as "big", featuring an orchestra, choir and bands, as well as "Italian instruments, accordions, live drums, mandolins [...] whistling human voices", and "eight-bit [sounds]". Mixing took place at Skywalker Sound, where Kondo and Miyamoto responded positively to a 15-minute suite of new themes Tyler had written. The film's music references leitmotifs from Super Mario Bros. 3 (1989), Super Mario 64 (1996) and Super Mario 3D Land (2011), among other Mario games.

Songs from Jack Black and Keegan-Michael Key were improvised for the film. Black Hydra composed the music for its official trailer, "Super Mushroom", based on the Super Mario Bros. theme. The instrumental was released on November 30, 2022, on YouTube.

In a March 2023 video, Seth Rogen shared that Donkey Kong was introduced in the film accompanied by the title theme music from Donkey Kong 64 (1999), "DK Rap", composed by Grant Kirkhope. In contrast to the licensed songs used in the film, Kirkhope did not receive credit for "DK Rap" in the film's end credits, an oversight the composer found disappointing.

Black co-wrote the song "Peaches", wherein Bowser professes his love for Princess Peach, alongside the directors, editor Eric Osmond, and song producer John Spiker. Having Bowser perform a love song was Black's idea. "Peaches" was released on April 7, 2023, with a music video directed by Cole Bennett. According to Black, it was filmed in a few hours. On its release, "Peaches" was #61 on the iTunes streaming chart. It later appeared on the Billboard Hot 100, debuting at #83 and peaking at #56.

== Marketing ==
On October 6, 2022, the teaser trailer was released live in a Nintendo Direct presentation. In a short questions and answers period following the trailer reveal at New York Comic Con, Jack Black stated that "Bowser has a musical side" in the film, teasing a theme for the character. The teaser trailer received over three million views in 24 hours. Journalists generally praised the trailer's visuals and tone, as well as Black and Key's performances as Bowser and Toad. However, Pratt's performance as Mario was described as lacking in emotion and sounding too similar to his normal speaking voice. Vic Hood from TechRadar noted a slight New York accent in Mario's lines, calling it a possible throwback to Mario's depictions in American media such as The Super Mario Bros. Super Show! (1989) and the 1993 film, before Charles Martinet debuted as the character's official voice actor in Mario's Game Gallery (1995) where he spoke full dialogue for extended periods of time. In a newsletter from The Guardian, the response to Pratt's voice was likened to the backlash against the first trailer of Sonic the Hedgehog (2020).

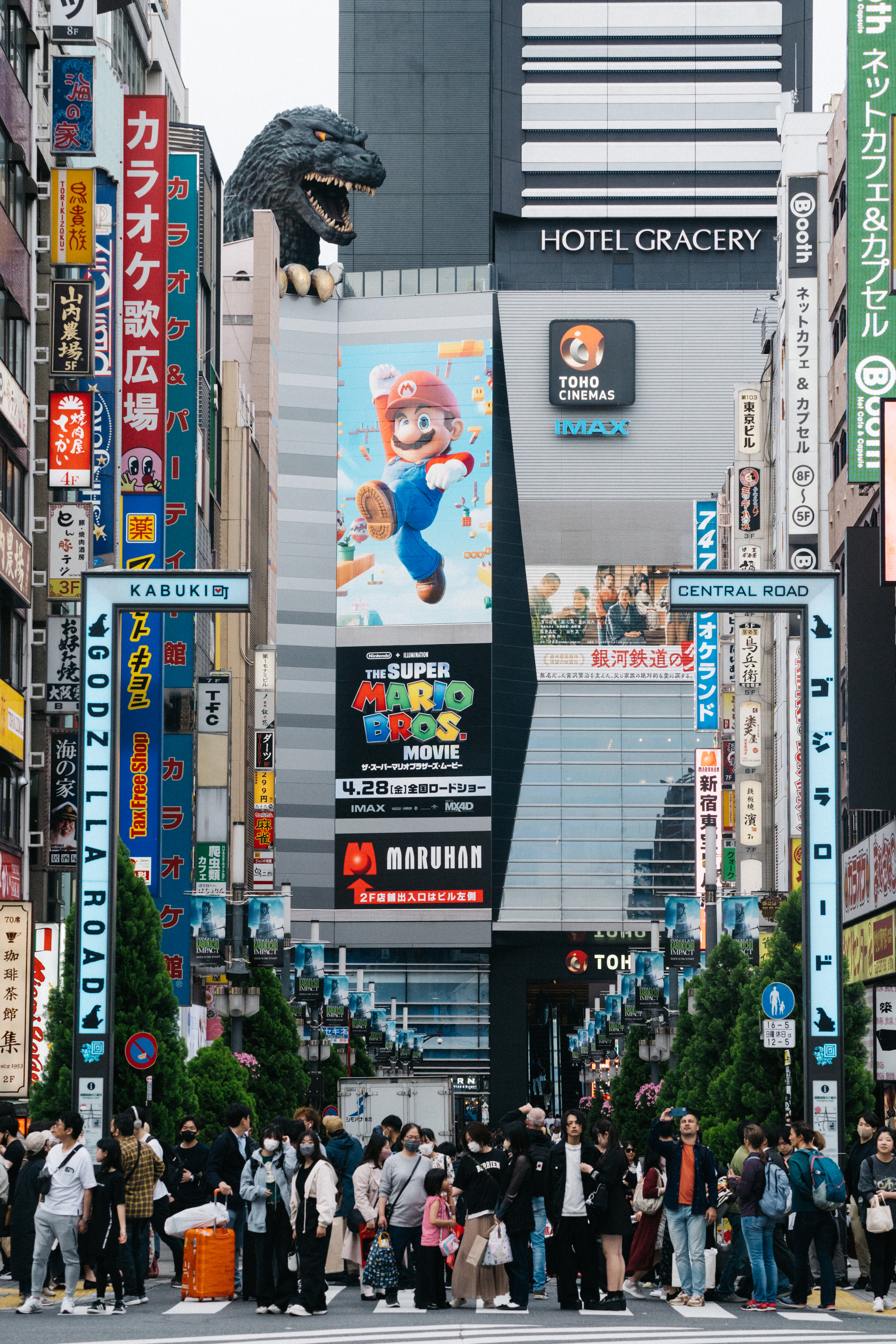
Advertisement screen in Tokyo outside Toho Cinemas

On November 29, the first official trailer was shown in a Nintendo Direct. Public reactions were still largely favorable, though online discourse continued to center on Pratt's performance as Mario.

On December 8, the first clip of the film, showing Toad guiding Mario through the Mushroom Kingdom and to the entrance to Peach's Castle, was revealed at The Game Awards 2022. The Verge's Ash Parrish commented, "Despite the skepticism surrounding Chris Pratt's performance as Mario, the movie's visuals—and I cannot stress enough, only the visuals—look incredible".

On January 29, 2023, a preview clip of the film was released during the NFC Championship Game. Some entertainment news sites pointed out the addition of Rogen's "iconic laugh" heard as Donkey Kong in the clip. Emma Roth from The Verge commented, "I'm pleasantly surprised at how well his voice (and laugh) suits the character", while Luke Plunkett from Kotaku commented, "Seth Rogen has been hired to... just be Seth Rogen".

On February 12, a commercial for the film was released during Super Bowl LVII, featuring a rendition of the title theme from The Super Mario Bros. Super Show!. A corresponding website which was featured in the trailer was also released, which advertises the Super Mario Bros. Plumbing Service from the film as if it were, according to Plunkett, "...a struggling small business servicing the Brooklyn and Queens areas".

== Release ==
=== Theatrical ===
The Super Mario Bros. Movie held its world premiere at Regal L.A. Live in Los Angeles, California on April 1, 2023, with the cast and crew in attendance. It was released theatrically in the United States on April 5, 2023, and later in Japan on April 28, in both regular formats and in IMAX 2D and 3D, with a runtime of 92 minutes.

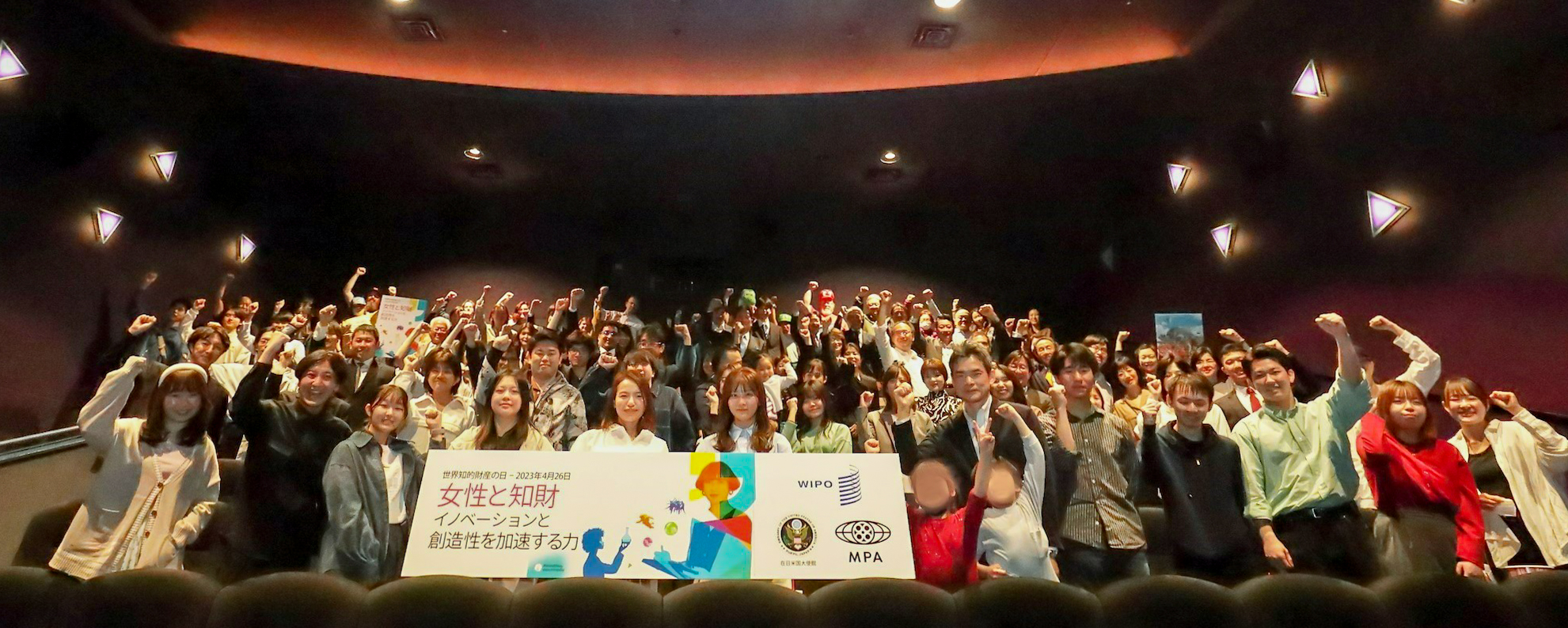
World Intellectual Property Day screening in 2023

The film was previously scheduled to be released on December 21, 2022 and April 7, 2023, the former of which was taken over by DreamWorks Animation's Puss in Boots: The Last Wish in response to the film's delay to the later date. On February 28, 2023, it was announced that the film would be released two days earlier, on its current date, to more than 60 markets while maintaining the April 28 date for Japan and stating that additional markets are to follow during April and May. It released in 65-plus countries on dates ranging from April 5 to 7. It was released on April 26 in South Korea and on May 26 in Poland. On May 11, 2023, the Motion Picture Association (MPA) collaborated with the U.S. Embassy in Kuala Lumpur to organize a special screening of The Super Mario Bros. Movie in honor of World Intellectual Property Day.

=== Home media ===
The Super Mario Bros. Movie was released on digital download on May 16, 2023, and was officially released on 4K Ultra-HD Blu-ray, Blu-ray, and DVD on June 13 in the US, with some early sales starting on June 6. The film was released on these formats in the UK on July 24. The film was made available to stream on NBCUniversal's Peacock streaming service on August 3, 2023. As part of an 18-month deal with Netflix for Universal's animated films, the film streamed on Peacock for the first four months of the pay-TV window, before moving to Netflix for the next ten beginning on December 3, and returning to Peacock for the remaining four beginning in October 2024. Between January and June 2024, the film amassed 80 million views, making it the fourth most-watched film on Netflix for the first half of 2024.

=== Internet leak ===
On April 30, 2023, a pirated copy of the film was leaked onto Twitter and was viewed by at least 9 million users in roughly 7 hours, before being removed by moderators. The incident raised concerns about Twitter's anti-piracy ability, staff reductions, and potential abuse of its private tools, as it was only made possible by a feature that allowed Twitter Blue subscribers to upload high-quality videos of up to one hour in length.

== Reception ==
=== Box office ===
The Super Mario Bros. Movie grossed $574.9 million in the United States and Canada, and $785.7 million in other territories, for a worldwide total of $1.360 billion. It also became the first film based on a video game to gross $1 billion worldwide, the highest-grossing animated film of 2023, and the second highest-grossing film of 2023 after Barbie. It became the highest-grossing film based on a video game after just one week of release, for which it earned a Guinness World Record. In May 2023, it overtook Minions (2015) to become the highest-grossing film produced by Illumination. Deadline Hollywood calculated the film's net profit as $559 million, accounting for production budgets, marketing, talent participations and other costs; box office grosses, television and streaming, and home media revenues placing it first on their list of 2023's "Most Valuable Blockbusters".

==== United States and Canada ====
In the United States and Canada, The Super Mario Bros. Movie was released alongside Air, and was initially projected to gross roughly $125 million from 4,025 theaters in its five-day opening weekend. After strong daily earnings, five-day estimates rose from $141 million to $191 million. The film ultimately debuted with $146.4 million over the three-day weekend and $204.6 million in five days. The Super Mario Bros. Movie, at the time, became the top opening weekend for a video game adaptation; this was later surpassed by A Minecraft Movie (2025), another video game film starring Black, two years later. It was the third-highest Easter opening weekend of all time, behind Furious 7 (2015) and Batman v Superman: Dawn of Justice (2016). The film became Illumination's largest opening weekend ever and had the biggest opening weekend for a 2023 film. Overall, The Super Mario Bros. Movie generated the third-highest domestic opening weekend for any animated film. It over-performed in other territories, making $173 million for a global opening weekend of $375 million, surpassing Frozen 2's (2019) record. Furthermore, it surpassed Warcraft (2016) to have the highest worldwide opening weekend for any video game adaptation.

The film made $92.5 million in its second weekend and $59.9 million in its third, both the highest ever for an animated film. The film continued to dominate the box office in its fourth weekend, grossing $40 million and crossing the global $1 billion mark on April 30. It became the fifth film of the pandemic era to cross this mark, as well as the first animated film to do so since Frozen II in 2019. In its fifth weekend, the film grossed $18.6 million, finishing in second place, and also became the 19th film to surpass $500 million at the US and Canadian box office.

==== Other territories ====
Outside the United States and Canada, The Super Mario Bros. Movie grossed $172.8 million in its opening weekend, setting records for the largest animated film debut in 10 markets and the biggest video game adaptation opening in 44 markets. The film maintained strong box office performance, earning $102.5 million in its second weekend across 71 markets, followed by $70.7 million in its third weekend from 78 markets. In its fourth weekend, it added $68.3 million from 80 territories, including a $14.3 million debut in Japan—the highest opening for an animated studio film in the country. The film's highest-grossing international markets included Japan ($101.4 million), Mexico ($85.4 million), the United Kingdom ($67.9 million), France ($62.8 million), Germany ($56.2 million) and Australia ($34.6 million). In Mexico, it became the highest-grossing film of all time, surpassing Spider-Man: No Way Home (2021).

=== Critical response ===
The Super Mario Bros. Movie received mixed reviews from critics. On the review aggregator website Rotten Tomatoes, 59% of 292 critics' reviews are positive, with an average rating of 5.7/10. The website's consensus reads: "While it's nowhere near as thrilling as turtle tipping your way to 128 lives, The Super Mario Bros. Movie is a colorful—albeit thinly plotted—animated adventure that has about as many Nintendos as Nintendon'ts." Metacritic, which uses a weighted average, assigned the film a score of 46 out of 100, based on 53 critics, indicating "mixed or average" reviews. Audiences polled by CinemaScore awarded the film an "A" on an A+ to F scale, while PostTrak reported that 94% of viewers gave it a positive score, and 82% said they would recommend it. Miyamoto felt that the critics who gave the film low ratings contributed to the film's success and creating the buzz around it.

Ross Bonaime of Collider gave a positive review, writing, "In many ways, The Super Mario Bros. Movie reminds of Wreck-It Ralph and the glee that came from seeing these characters on screen." Writing for the Datebook section of the San Francisco Chronicle, Zaki Hasan said he enjoyed the visuals but felt the film's strong adherence to and copious references to the games left it lacking in narrative, and that it tried too hard to avoid the failures of the 1993 film, calling it "a blandly efficient piece of brand management". IGN's Tom Jorgensen praised the film's energy, its musical score despite the inclusion of "shoehorned" pop songs, and its visuals for setting a "very high bar".

Kyle Anderson of Nerdist celebrated the animation for its game accuracy and called Illumination "the perfect choice to make Mario movies" but opined that "those expecting something akin to The Lego Movie might be left a bit cold" due to lack of a plot outside the main beats given the film's short run time. Soren Andersen of The Seattle Times commented that, while the film succeeded in appealing to the Mario fanbase by creating the feeling of being inside a video game, he found the characters to be lacking in personality and criticized their voice performances, remarking: "...everyone expresses themselves at the tops of their voices, sound and fury signifying not a whole lot". Brian Tallerico of RogerEbert.com, a self-described lifelong fan, wrote that the vocal performances were "uniformly mediocre", and that the film "doesn't reflect the franchise's creativity in the slightest". The Los Angeles Times' Katie Walsh praised Black's performance as Bowser but criticized both Pratt and Day's lead performances of Mario and Luigi as "so unremarkable that it could have been anyone at all".

Calum Marsh writing for The New York Times criticized Pratt's performance as "grating" and "unctuous" while describing the overall film as "bland, witless and flagrantly pandering". Kristy Puchko from Mashable commended the fan service and music but was critical of the writing, the characters, and Pratt's lack of accent, commenting "whatever voice Pratt is doing isn't Brooklyn, and it isn't anything particularly specific, consistent, or exciting". Screen Rant's Molly Freeman praised the film for being a "love letter" to fans but criticized it for offering little else, describing most of the voice cast as "fun" with Black's Bowser being a standout. Josh Spiegel from /Film considered the film's portrayal of Princess Peach as a capable, powerful guide for Mario a positive change from her video game portrayals as a damsel in distress, but argued that it felt more fitting for "a film from 25 years ago, not from 2023". Vulture's Alison Willmore criticized the portrayal of Princess Peach in the movie for only being a "winsome blonde whose main quality is being so good at everything". Collier Jennings from Collider blamed the film for causing Peach "to have fallen victim to the girlboss factor", considering that it attempted to create a well rounded female character but failed to give her personality traits aside from "girlbossing", criticizing the film for not giving the character "much in the way of flaws, let alone any personality traits aside from being a badass".

=== Accolades ===
Accolades received by The Super Mario Bros. Movie
Award	Date of ceremony	Category	Recipient(s)	Result	Ref.
Golden Trailer Awards	June 29, 2023	Most Innovative Advertising for a Feature Film	"Giant Peach" (Inside Job)	Nominated	
MTV MIAW Awards	August 4, 2023	MIAWudio of the Year	"Peaches"	Nominated	
MTV MIAW Awards	August 4, 2023	Killer Series or Movie	The Super Mario Bros. Movie	Won	
Hollywood Music in Media Awards	November 15, 2023	Best Original Score – Animated Film	Brian Tyler	Nominated	
Hollywood Music in Media Awards	November 15, 2023	Best Original Song – Animated Film	Jack Black, John Spiker, Eric Osmond, Michael Jelenic, and Aaron Horvath ("Peaches")	Nominated	
The Game Awards	December 7, 2023	Best Adaptation	The Super Mario Bros. Movie	Nominated	
Washington D.C. Area Film Critics Association Awards	December 10, 2023	Best Voice Performance	Jack Black	Nominated	
Astra Film Awards	January 6, 2024	Best Voice-Over Performance	Jack Black	Nominated	
Astra Film Awards	January 6, 2024	Best Original Song	Jack Black, John Spiker, Eric Osmond, Michael Jelenic, and Aaron Horvath ("Peaches")	Nominated	
Golden Globe Awards	January 7, 2024	Best Original Song	Jack Black, John Spiker, Eric Osmond, Michael Jelenic, and Aaron Horvath ("Peaches")	Nominated	
Golden Globe Awards	January 7, 2024	Best Animated Feature Film	The Super Mario Bros. Movie	Nominated	
Golden Globe Awards	January 7, 2024	Cinematic and Box Office Achievement	The Super Mario Bros. Movie	Nominated	
Critics' Choice Movie Awards	January 14, 2024	Best Song	Jack Black, John Spiker, Eric Osmond, Michael Jelenic, and Aaron Horvath ("Peaches")	Nominated	
Saturn Awards	February 4, 2024	Best Animated Film	The Super Mario Bros. Movie	Nominated	
Movieguide Awards	February 9, 2024	Best Movie for Families	The Super Mario Bros. Movie	Won	
Annie Awards	February 17, 2024	Best Voice Acting - Feature	Jack Black	Nominated	
People's Choice Awards	February 18, 2024	The Movie of the Year	The Super Mario Bros. Movie	Nominated	
Visual Effects Society Awards	February 21, 2024	Outstanding Effects Simulations in an Animated Feature	Simon Pate, Christophe Vazquez, Milo Riccarand	Nominated	
Producers Guild of America Awards	February 25, 2024	Outstanding Producer of Animated Theatrical Motion Pictures	Chris Meledandri, Shigeru Miyamoto	Nominated	
Astra Film Creative Arts Awards	February 26, 2024	Best Publicity Campaign	The Super Mario Bros. Movie	Nominated	
Nickelodeon Kids' Choice Awards	July 13, 2024	Favorite Animated Movie	The Super Mario Bros. Movie	Nominated	
Nickelodeon Kids' Choice Awards	July 13, 2024	Favorite Male Voice From an Animated Movie	Chris Pratt	Nominated	
Nickelodeon Kids' Choice Awards	July 13, 2024	Favorite Male Voice From an Animated Movie	Jack Black	Nominated	
Nickelodeon Kids' Choice Awards	July 13, 2024	Favorite Female Voice From an Animated Movie	Anya Taylor-Joy	Nominated	
Nickelodeon Kids' Choice Awards	July 13, 2024	Favorite Villain	Jack Black	Won	

== Future ==
=== Sequel ===
In May 2021, Furukawa said that Nintendo was interested in producing more animated films based on its intellectual properties if the Mario Bros. film was successful. In a Variety cover story before the film's release, producer Chris Meledandri was asked about potential sequels, or projects adapted from other Nintendo properties, and answered, "Our focus right now is entirely on bringing the film out to the audience, and at this time, we're not prepared to talk about what's coming in the future".

On April 21, 2023, following the film's box office success, Nintendo stated that there would be more films based on their properties, though they did not directly confirm a sequel to The Super Mario Bros. Movie. In June 2023, Pratt stated that while news on a sequel would come "soon", development on the project had been put on hold due to the 2023 Writers Guild of America strike, saying that it would only resume once "the writers [felt] comfortable moving forward." In November, it was revealed that Universal was making plans to build a larger franchise around the film while also confirming a sequel.

On March 10, 2024, as part of Mario Day celebrations, Miyamoto and Meledandri officially announced a sequel, along with a release date of April 3, 2026 in the United States and more dates throughout April for other territories. Horvath, Jelenic and Fogel returned as co-directors and screenwriter respectively; Meledandri stated that Illumination's team was in the process of storyboarding and "developing set designs for new environments." In October 2024, Keegan-Michael Key mentioned that the sequel would be "broader in scope" and will feature "some new folks that are old favorites and some folks that I think are really deep cuts".

On May 13, 2025, NBCUniversal listed the sequel under the title Super Mario World, which was later removed. A Nintendo Direct presentation on September 12, 2025, announced the film as The Super Mario Galaxy Movie. A second Nintendo Direct on November 12, 2025, premiered the sequel's first trailer.

=== Proposed spin-offs ===
Multiple voice actors have expressed interest in spin-offs based on their characters. In February 2022, Charlie Day expressed interest in reprising his role as Luigi in a Luigi's Mansion film and reiterated his interest in March 2023. That same month, Anya Taylor-Joy expressed interest in a possibility of a spin-off film revolving around Princess Peach.

In April 2023, Seth Rogen expressed interest in Donkey Kong Country (1994) forming the basis of future works, stating it created "a lot of opportunity" for a spin-off film. On July 13, 2025, a copyright registration for "Untitled Donkey Kong Project" was filed by Nintendo and Universal.

In April 2026, following the release of The Super Mario Galaxy Movie, Miyamoto stated that there were no plans for a crossover film based on the Super Smash Bros. video game series, saying "I'll say that unlike something like Super Smash Bros., I don't think you'll have a situation [where] all Nintendo characters would be joining."

== See also ==
- List of films based on video games
