= List of 2025 box office number-one films in Ecuador =

This is a list of films which placed number-one at the weekend box office in Ecuador during 2025.

== Number-one films ==
#	Weekend end date	Film	Box office	Openings in the top ten	Ref.
1	January 5, 2025	Nosferatu	$144,593		
2	January 12, 2025	Nosferatu	$63,068		
3	January 19, 2025	Nosferatu	$24,113	Anora #2	
4	January 26, 2025	Flight Risk	$45,772		
5	February 2, 2025	Flight Risk	$15,321		
6	February 9, 2025	Conclave	$36,797	The Brutalist #2	
7	February 16, 2025	Bridget Jones: Mad About the Boy	$38,580		
8	February 23, 2025	The Monkey	$67,789		
9	March 2, 2025	The Monkey	$44,923	Conclave #2, Nosotros, los De la Fe #3	
10	March 9, 2025	The Monkey	$16,815	Maria #4	
11	March 16, 2025	Black Bag	$25,892		
12	March 23, 2025	Conclave	$3,753		
13	March 30, 2025	Conclave	$2,595		
14	April 6, 2025	The Monkey	$67,789		
15	April 13, 2025	Drop	$23,475		
16	April 20, 2025	In the Lost Lands	$31,347		
17	April 27, 2025	In the Lost Lands	$7,576	Small Things Like These #3	
18	May 4, 2025	Conclave	$3,778		
19	May 11, 2025	Conclave	$1,183		
20	May 18, 2025	No box office data for the weekend of May 18 2025.			
21	May 25, 2025	Conclave	$133		
22	June 1, 2025	Conclave	$165		
23	June 8, 2025	Ballerina	$100,404		
24	June 15, 2025	How to Train Your Dragon	$714,309		
25	June 22, 2025	How to Train Your Dragon	$480,445		
26	June 29, 2025	How to Train Your Dragon	$292,469	M3GAN 2.0 #2	
27	July 6, 2025	Jurassic World: Rebirth	$630,835		
28	July 13, 2025	Jurassic World: Rebirth	$335,990		
29	July 20, 2025	Jurassic World: Rebirth	$241,362		
30	July 27, 2025	Jurassic World: Rebirth	$144,240		
31	August 3, 2025	The Bad Guys 2	$98,616		
32	August 10, 2025	The Bad Guys 2	$82,025		
33	August 17, 2025	The Bad Guys 2	$54,426	Dangerous Animals #2	
34	August 24, 2025	The Bad Guys 2	$42,306	Nobody 2 #2	
35	August 31, 2025	The Bad Guys 2	$27,576		
36	September 7, 2025	The Life of Chuck	$9,073		
37	September 14, 2025	The Life of Chuck	$1,966		
38	September 21, 2025	No box office data for the weekend of September 21 2025.			
39	September 28, 2025	Gabby's Dollhouse: The Movie	$60,847		
40	October 5, 2025	Gabby's Dollhouse: The Movie	$35,378		
41	October 12, 2025	The Smashing Machine	$36,149		
42	October 19, 2025	Black Phone 2	$166,917		
43	October 26, 2025	Black Phone 2	$109,185		
44	November 2, 2025	Black Phone 2	$74,664		
45	November 9, 2025	Black Phone 2	$34,015	Roofman #2	
46	November 16, 2025	Black Phone 2	$13,041		
47	November 23, 2025	Wicked: For Good	$117,116		
48	November 30, 2025	Now You See Me: Now You Don't	$24,556		
49	December 7, 2025	Five Nights at Freddy's 2	$548,963	The Threesome #3	
50	December 14, 2025	Five Nights at Freddy's 2	$218,997	Bugonia #2	
51	December 21, 2025	Bugonia	$2,543		
52	December 28, 2025	Bugonia	$1,683		

== See also ==
- 2025 in Ecuador

Preceded by 2024 Box office number-one films	Box office number-one films 2025	Succeeded by 2026 Box office number-one films
