= Koopa Troopa =

Mario franchise species

Koopa Troopas
- Mario race
- Promotional art by Shigehisa Nakaue (2015)
- First appearance: Super Mario Bros. (1985)
- Created by: Shigeru Miyamoto
- Genre: Platform game

In-universe information
- Sub-races: Koopa Paratroopa; Dry Bones
- Leader: Bowser
- Notable members: Bowser; Bowser Jr. Koopalings; Kooper; Koops

Koopa Troopas (Note: Japanese: ノコノコ, Hepburn: Nokonoko) are a fictional turtle-like race of characters from the Mario media franchise. They are commonly referred to as Koopas, a more broad classification of creatures that includes Bowser, his Koopalings, and Lakitu. Predecessors to Koopa Troopas, Shellcreepers, (Note: シェルクリーパー, Sherukurīpā; or カメさん, Kame-san) first appeared in the 1983 game Mario Bros., while Koopa Troopas themselves debuted two years later in Super Mario Bros. (1985). Koopa Troopas are a common staple in most Super Mario and spinoff games. When defeated, they may flee from or retreat inside their shells, which can usually be used as weapons. Koopa shells are a recurring weapon in the franchise, particularly popularized in the Mario Kart series, in which they can be fired as projectiles against other racers. Despite making up the bulk of Bowser's army, Koopa Troopas are often shown to be peaceful, sometimes even teaming up with protagonist Mario.

== Concept and creation ==
After the release and success of the arcade game Donkey Kong (1981), Nintendo began work on a follow-up game more prominently focusing on the character of Mario, which released as Mario Bros. (1983). The idea of creating a turtle enemy came as a result of developing its core gameplay mechanics. After designers Gunpei Yokoi and Shigeru Miyamoto established that the game would revolve around Mario possessing superhuman jumping abilities that were to be used to jump between different floors or platforms, they approached how enemies would be attacked. They came up with the idea of the player attacking enemies from one level below, making Mario hit his ceiling so that it would bump the enemy's floor and defeat them. However, this method of defeating enemies was deemed too easy in playtesting, so they instead implemented a two-step approach of having to stun the enemies first. When thinking about what types of enemies it would make sense to stun like this, they came up with the idea of a turtle getting stuck after getting knocked upside down on its shell. So the gameplay was set up so that the player would now hit the turtle from below, knocking it on its back, and then jump directly on it to defeat it before it was able to correct itself.

With the premise established, they turned to creating the turtle character itself. Miyamoto initially dictated what he wanted it to look like to a Nintendo designer, but the initial draft came out looking like a very realistic looking turtle that Miyamoto felt did not fit in well with the rest of the Mario art style. Instead, Miyamoto drew the concept art himself, emphasizing a cartoonish large head and more of a tortoise-like shape. With discussing the anatomy of turtles with fellow Nintendo staffer Hirokazu Tanaka, they came up with the idea of the turtle character getting knocked out of its shell entirely. While conceding that this is not how turtle shells work, Miyamoto liked the idea because it helped with visualizing when the turtle was still in a stunned state; out of its shell, it was stunned, and once it returned, it was active again. While initially wondered if this was a form of "lying to children", in the end, he decided that the ability to entirely remove the body from the shell would be a key difference between a turtle and a Koopa Troopa.

For the Mario Bros. game the character would be named "Shellcreepers", but in subsequent Super Mario games, the character would be renamed Koopa Troopa. Up until very late pre-release builds of its follow-up game, Super Mario Bros. (1985), Koopa Troopa was the only enemy in the game; however, playtesting found that his two-step process of defeating him was too difficult for early stages of the game. Rather than change Koopa Troopa, this led to the creation of another long-running Mario character – the Goomba. Similarly, when developer Takashi Tezuka wished to create a new enemy character that could fly, he found himself unable to due to size and memory restrictions of the Nintendo Entertainment System hardware. Instead, to save on memory he decided to build off of the established Koopa Troopa design by adding wings to the top of his shell. While Miyamoto expressed hesitation at first, he was convinced when he saw the final design, and thus, the Koopa Paratroopa was born and implemented into the game. As Nintendo progressed with developing games for more powerful hardware, this allowed for further developments on the evolution of Koopa Troopas. Super Mario World (1991), the first Super Mario game for the more powerful Super Nintendo platform, allowed for more advanced movement and animations, including unshelled Koopa Troopas who flew around in capes and slid down hills. This later influenced the development of Super Mario Bros. Wonder (2023) as well; when developers were looking for ways to update old character designs with new animations and designs, the Rolla Koopa – a Koopa Troopa who moves around on roller skates, was created. More powerful hardware also led to a more vibrant yellow and green color scheme for the character.

== Appearances ==
=== Video games ===
Since their creation and first appearances in Mario Bros. and Super Mario Bros., Koopa Troopa have become a staple in the Mario series and subseries. Koopa Troopa has reappeared in most entries of the Super Mario line of platform games. They commonly retain their original traits of wandering aimlessly through levels, and requiring to be knocked out of their shell prior to their defeat. After defeat, their shells often remain, and can be grabbed, thrown, or bumped as a projectile to attack other enemies or alter the game environment.

They are also featured prominently in many spinoff series as well. They have been included as a playable character in most entries in the Mario Kart racing series. Koopa Shells are used as an obtainable projectile weapon to shoot at other players in every entry as well. Similarly, Koopa Shells are used in the same manner in entries of the Mario Tennis and Mario Strikers (soccer) series as well, with playable character options sporadically occurring across entries. They are playable in some Mario Golf entries as well. While not present as playable characters in the Super Smash Bros. series, their shells have appeared as projectile weapons to be launched at other characters in every entry of the series. Koopa Troopas appear as hosts or extra minor characters across all entries of the Mario Party board game/minigame series, and is a playable character in Mario Party 9 and Super Mario Party.

=== In other media ===
Koopa Troopas commonly appear in other Mario media as well. They were featured prominently in the 2023 The Super Mario Bros. Movie as part of Bowser's army. The film introduced the Spiny shell Koopa Troopa; Mario Kart has prominently featured the infamous blue shell item, but the film was first to see the shell used on actual characters. They largely retain their roles from the game as minions in Bowser's army, and general appearance from the modern games, albeit with wearing armor and spiked shells. Toys of a Koopa Troopa riding a bike were released in promotion of the 2023 film as well. In addition to toys, they were also featured in multiple toys-to-life iterations, including getting his own Amiibo in 2017. They appear in the Wii U version of Skylanders: SuperChargers, being summoned by Bowser during one of his special moves. Their signature shell was included as a player piece in the Nintendo version of the Monopoly board game.

== Reception and legacy ==
Koopa Troopa has gone on to become one of the most commonly recognizable enemies in the Mario franchise alongside Goomba. IGN's Audrey Drake listed Koopa Troopa as one of the best Mario enemies, saying that it is one of the most "iconic Mario enemies out there. In fact, they're pretty much synonymous with the franchise." In October 2022, The Daily Dot reported that a Koopa Troopa video clip from a New Super Mario Bros. game went viral on TikTok. In the video, two Koopa Troopas running in unison slowly make progress in crossing a spinning circular platform. However, in this game, Koopa Troopas always stop and briefly dance whenever a "bah bah" sound clip plays in the game's background music. In the clip, they stop and dance, and it cancels all of their progress on traversing the spinning platform, keeping them stuck in a loop. The video elicited much commentary on Koopa Troopas being forced to dance at inopportune times. The Koopa Troopa clip amassed 20 million views in under a month, and inspired over 20,000 similar videos related to Koopa Troopas dancing to the sound clip.

The design of Koopa Troopa would influence and impact the creation of other Mario characters as well. In creating a second playable character for Mario Bros., the developers decided to make a palette swapped version of Mario, and due to hardware limitations regarding how many different colors could be appearing on screen, they decided to use the green color used for Koopa Troopa, eventually leading to the creation of Luigi and his trademark green color scheme. Koopa Troopa's design also influenced Bowser's final design. Miyamoto's initial instructions to character designer Yoichi Kotabe resulted in more of an ox-like character design, and their efforts to revise his art to make him look more like Koopa Troopas resulted in Bowser's final design.

Koopa Troopa has later been used by Nintendo in larger scale promotions outside of video games as well. In 2015, the character was part of Nintendo's float at the Toronto Santa Claus Parade. They've also become an integral part of the Super Nintendo World theme park area in Universal parks. Koopa Troopa animatronics are found wandering throughout the park, while restaurants serve up Koopa Troopa calzones. A Koopa Troopa also serves as one of the bosses of their real world adventure games, while a Koopa Troopa and its shell are central one of the park's central games, "Koopa Troopa POWer Punch". In it, players in real life attempt to hit POW Blocks to knock over Koopa Troopas, similar to early Mario games.

== See also ==
- List of Mario franchise enemies
