= List of 2026 box office number-one films in Ecuador =

This is a list of films which placed number-one at the weekend box office in Ecuador during 2026.

== Number-one films ==
#	Weekend end date	Film	Box office	Openings in the top ten	Ref.
1	January 4, 2026	Five Nights at Freddy's 2	$18,819	Song Sung Blue #2	
2	January 11, 2026	Five Nights at Freddy's 2	$4,043		
3	January 18, 2026	No box office data for the weekend of January 18 2026.			
4	January 25, 2026	No box office data for the weekend of January 25 2026.			
5	February 1, 2026	The Housemaid	$37,002	Hamnet #2	
6	February 8, 2026	Greenland 2: Migration	$125,996		

== See also ==
- 2026 in Ecuador

Preceded by 2025 Box office number-one films	Box office number-one films 2026	Succeeded by 2027 Box office number-one films
