= Koops =

Koops is a Dutch patronymic surname derived from the given name Koop, a short form of Jacob. People with the surname Koops include:

- Evert Koops (1885–1938), Dutch track and field athlete
- Matthias Koops (fl. 1789–1805), Pomeranian-born British paper-maker
- Roelof Koops (1909–2008), Dutch speed skater
- Steven Koops (born 1978), Australian rules footballer

Koops is also a shy Koopa Troopa character in the video game Paper Mario: The Thousand-Year Door.

== See also ==
- Koop (disambiguation)
