= Sahlins =

Sahlins is a surname. Notable people with the surname include:

- Bernard Sahlins (1922–2013), American writer, director, and comedian
- Marshall Sahlins (1930–2021), American anthropologist
- Peter Sahlins (born 1957), American historian

== See also ==
- Sahlin
