= Yuri Albertovich =

Yuri Albertovich may refer to:

- Yuri Dzitssuty, Ossetian politician
- Yuri Rozanov (1961–2021), Russian sports television commentator
