= Knockout City =

2021 multiplayer-only action video game

- Developer: Velan Studios
- Publishers: Electronic Arts (2021–22) (Note: Published under the EA Originals label); Velan Studios (2022–)
- Director: Jeremy Russo
- Producers: Rich Nolan Jr. Kevin Teich
- Programmer: Greg Oberg
- Artist: Ben Greene
- Engine: Viper
- Platforms: Microsoft Windows; Nintendo Switch; PlayStation 4; Xbox One
- Release: May 21, 2021
- Genres: Action, Sports
- Mode: Multiplayer

Knockout City was an action video game developed by Velan Studios. Publisher Electronic Arts released the game for Microsoft Windows, Nintendo Switch, PlayStation 4 and Xbox One in May 2021 under its EA Originals label. Velan Studios took over publishing duties in June 2022, and the game transitioned into a fully free-to-play title on June 1, 2022. The game's public servers shut down as of June 6, 2023, which ended the ability to play the game on all consoles; however a separate version developed for Windows, designed for players to host their own private servers, is available.

== Gameplay ==
Knockout City is a team-based competitive multiplayer video game whose gameplay rules resemble dodgeball. The player's goal is to attack enemies from the opposing team by knocking them out with a ball. There are several types of balls in the game, including the Moon Ball, which allows the player holding the ball to jump higher, and the Bomb Ball, which is a time bomb that explodes on impact. A player can also throw another player as a ball. When ready to throw a ball, the player targets and locks on to an enemy; holding down the throw button charges up the ball for a faster shot that can be more difficult to catch. A successful throw depends not on the accuracy or the precision of the throw, but on the player's positioning and strategy. Players can dodge or catch a ball that is thrown at them, and they will respawn after getting hit by a ball twice. The player can also fake throw a ball, and tackle an opponent holding a ball. As the player progresses in the game, they will receive Holobux, which can be spent at the Brawl Shop to unlock various customization items.

At launch, the game features five maps and six modes. All of the maps are set in a futuristic metropolis named Knockout City, and each map also features various environmental hazards which can knock a player out. The modes announced include Team KO, which is a variant of team deathmatch, Diamond Dash, in which players must collect diamonds dropped by defeated enemies, and Ball-Up Brawl, a four-versus-four mode in which the player must throw their teammates to eliminate enemies. The player can also form a Crew of maximum 32 players.

== Development and release ==
Knockout City was developed by Velan Studios, which had previously released Mario Kart Live: Home Circuit in 2020. The team, which has about 85 employees, spent four years developing the game. Velan Studios described the game as a "dodgebrawl" title, and its CEO, Karthik Bala, added that the team chose dodgeball to be the game's core gameplay loop because it was considered to be an "intuitive" sport. The game was designed to be accessible for both newcomers, while complex enough for competitive players. Velan Studios built an engine named Viper to power the game and created a programming script named V-script, which aimed at countering network latency.

Publisher Electronic Arts announced in March 2019 that it had signed a publishing deal with Velan Studios. It was published under the publisher's EA Originals initiative, which aims at supporting independent games. The game was officially announced via a Nintendo Direct on February 17, 2021. A beta for the game was held from April 2, 2021, to April 4, 2021, for PC and consoles. Knockout City was released for Microsoft Windows, Nintendo Switch, PlayStation 4 and Xbox One (with enhanced backwards compatibility for PlayStation 5 and Xbox Series X and Series S) on May 21, 2021, with cross platform play and shared progression between platforms. Velan envisioned the game as a live service, and will be introducing new content regularly via seasons.

In April 2021, it was announced that the game would be available to play at no cost to EA Play and Xbox Game Pass Ultimate subscribers. It was later announced that the game would be free-to-play for the first ten days of release. The game attracted 2 million players within its first week of release. After the launch trial, EA announced that the game would be free-to-play until the player had reached level 25. Following the launch of Season 6, the game transitioned into a fully free-to-play title on June 1, 2022. Velan Studios also replaced EA to self-publish the game. Players who have already purchased the game were compensated with in-game extras including customization items, XP boosts and additional Holobux. On September 19, 2022, Velan Studios announced that the game will move from EA's Origin online services to the Epic Online Services with the Version 7.1 patch. A one-time account migration system from EA to Epic was available until the release of the Version 8.1 patch on January 10, 2023.

In February 2023, it was announced that after the completion of the game’s ninth season, the game would shut down on June 6, 2023, though a Windows version compatible with private hosted servers would be available after the shutdown.

== Reception ==
Reception

Aggregate score
Aggregator	Score
Metacritic	NS: 83/100; PC: 80/100; PS4: 80/100; XONE: 83/100; XSX: 82/100

Review scores
Publication	Score
Destructoid	8/10
Game Informer	8.5/10
GameSpot	8/10
GamesRadar+	4.5/5
IGN	9/10
Jeuxvideo.com	15/20
Nintendo Life	9/10

Knockout City received generally positive reviews upon release according to Metacritic. Some reviewers compared Knockout City with Rocket Arena, a 2020 game also published by Electronic Arts.

=== Awards and accolades ===
Knockout City was nominated for "Best Multiplayer Game" at The Game Awards 2021, and "Online Game of the Year" at the 25th Annual D.I.C.E. Awards.
