= Electronic Arts =

American video game company

Electronic Arts Inc.

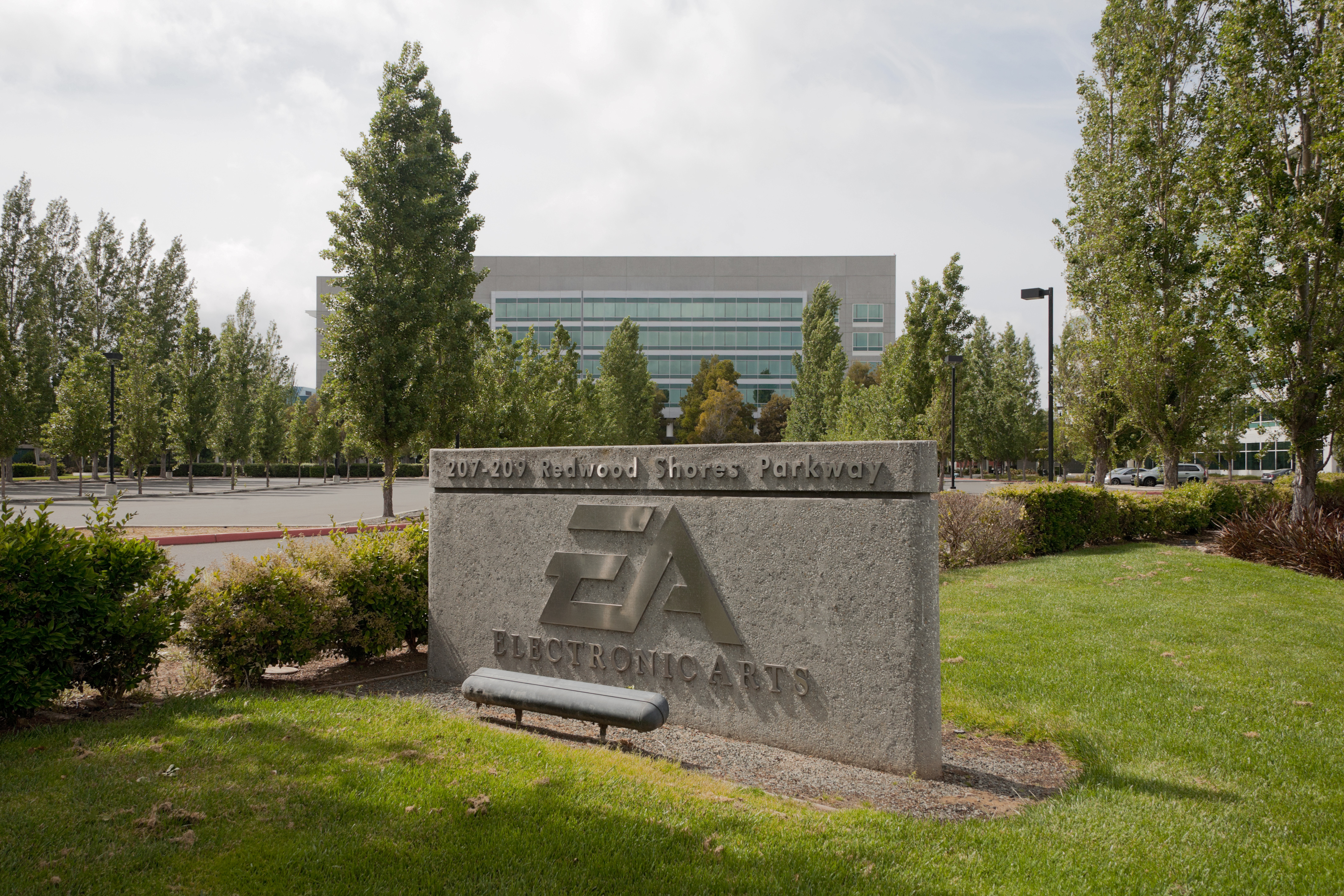
- The EA headquarters building at Redwood City, California, in May 2011
- Type: Subsidiary
- Traded as: Nasdaq: ERTS (1990–2011); Nasdaq: EA (2011–2026); Nasdaq-100 component (until 2026); S&P 500 component (until 2026)
- Industry: Video games
- Founded: May 27, 1982; 44 years ago in San Mateo, California, U.S.
- Founder: Trip Hawkins
- Headquarters: Redwood City, California, U.S.
- Area served: Worldwide
- Key people: Andrew Wilson (CEO and chairman); Cam Weber (co-president and CSO); David Tinson (co-president and COO)
- Products: See list of Electronic Arts games
- Revenue: ▲US$8.0 billion (2026)
- Operating income: ▼US$1.2 billion (2026)
- Net income: ▼US$887 million (2026)
- Total assets: ▲US$13.1 billion (2026)
- Total equity: ▲US$6.8 billion (2026)
- Owners: Public Investment Fund (93.4%); Silver Lake (5.5%); Affinity Partners (1.1%)
- Number of employees: c. 14,500 (2025)
- Divisions: EA Entertainment; EA Sports
- Subsidiaries: See § Company structure
- Website: ea.com
- Footnotes; Financials as of March 31, 2025.

Electronic Arts Inc. (EA) is an American video game company headquartered in Redwood City, California, United States. Founded in May 1982 by former Apple employee Trip Hawkins, the company was a pioneer of the early home computer game industry and promoted the designers and programmers responsible for its games as "software artists". EA published numerous games and some productivity software for personal computers, all of which were developed by external individuals or groups until 1987's Skate or Die! The company shifted toward internal game studios, often through acquisitions, such as Distinctive Software becoming EA Canada in 1991.

Into the 21st century, EA develops and publishes games of established franchises, including Army of Two, Battlefield, Command & Conquer, Dragon Age, Dead Space, Mass Effect, Medal of Honor, Need for Speed, Plants vs. Zombies, The Sims, Skate, SSX, and Star Wars, as well as the EA Sports titles College Football, Dirt Rally, FC–FIFA, Madden NFL, NASCAR, NBA Live, NHL, PGA, UFC, and WRC. Since 2022, its desktop titles appear on the self-developed EA App, an online gaming digital distribution platform for PCs and a direct competitor to Valve's Steam and Epic Games' Store. EA also owns and operates major gaming studios such as Battlefield Studios (Criterion Games, DICE, Motive Studio, and Ripple Effect Studios), and Respawn Entertainment.

EA announced plans for a leveraged buyout by the Saudi Arabia Public Investment Fund (PIF), Silver Lake and Affinity Partners in September 2025 for $55 billion, including $20 billion in debt equity. The buyout was completed on August 4, 2026, making it the largest leveraged buyout to date.

EA has faced criticisms and controversies for its business practices, with common complaints being pushing aggressive microtransactions, releasing incomplete games, and buying and shutting down smaller game studios. It also faced lawsuits alleging EA's anti-competition when signing sports-related contracts.

== History ==
=== 1982–1991: Trip Hawkins era, founding, and early success ===
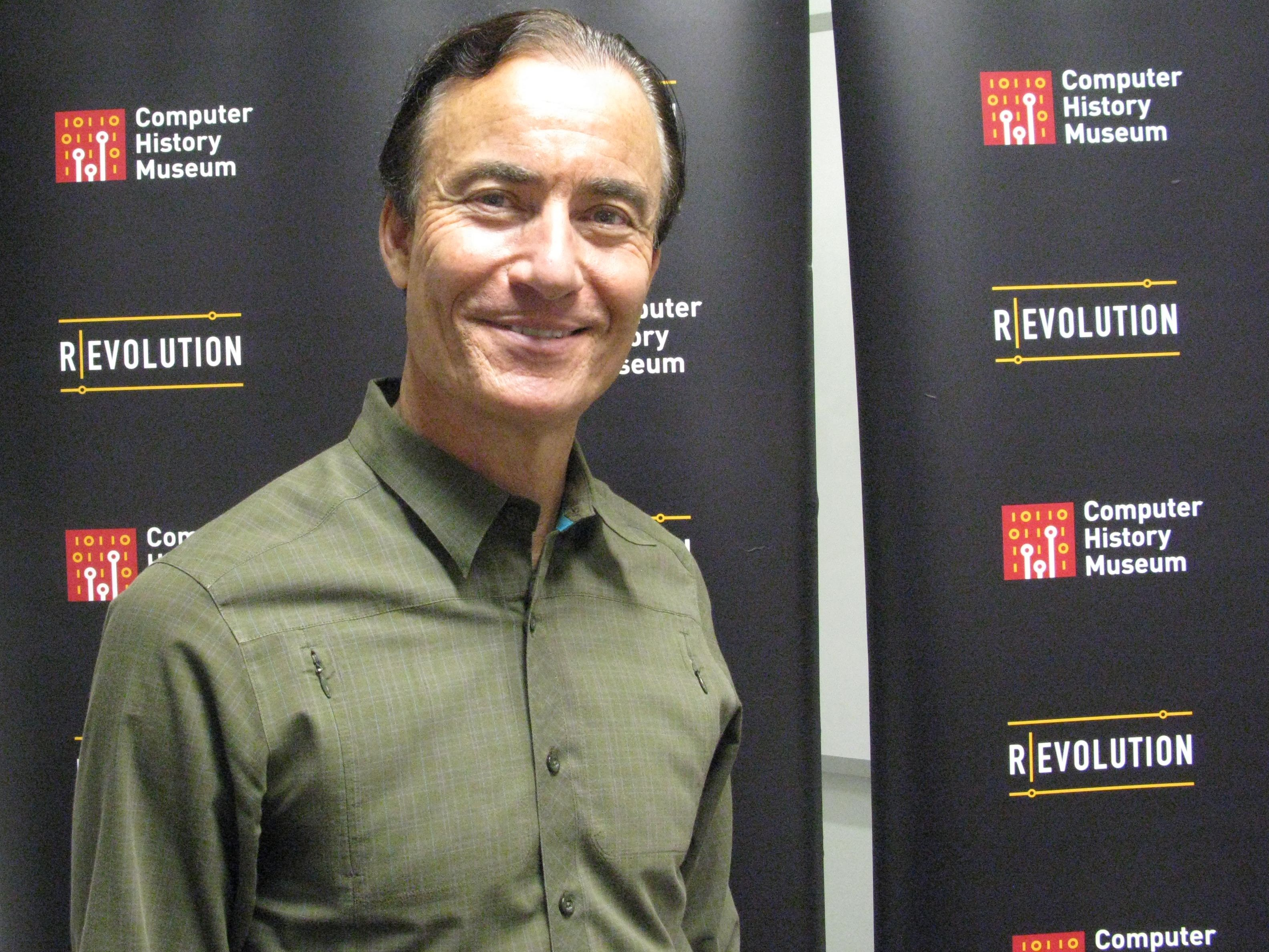
Founder Trip Hawkins in 2013

Trip Hawkins had been an Apple Inc. employee since 1978, when the company had only about 50 employees. Over the next four years, the market for home personal computers skyrocketed. By 1982, Apple had completed its initial public offering (IPO) and become a Fortune 500 company with over one thousand employees. In February 1982, Hawkins arranged a meeting with Don Valentine of Sequoia Capital to discuss financing his new venture, Amazin' Software. Valentine encouraged Hawkins to leave Apple, where the latter served as Director of Product Marketing, and allowed Hawkins to use Sequoia Capital's spare office space to start the company. Trip Hawkins incorporated and established the company with a personal investment of an estimated US$200,000 on May 27, 1982.

For more than seven months, Hawkins refined his Electronic Arts business plan. With aid from his first employee (with whom he worked in marketing at Apple), Rich Melmon, the original plan was written, mostly by Hawkins, on an Apple II in Sequoia Capital's office in August 1982. During that time, Hawkins also employed two of his former staff from Apple, Dave Evans and Pat Marriott, as producers, and a Stanford MBA classmate, Jeff Burton from Atari for international business development. The business plan was again refined in September and reissued on October 8, 1982. By November, the employee headcount rose to 11, including Tim Mott, Bing Gordon, David Maynard, and Steve Hayes. Having outgrown the office space provided by Sequoia Capital, the company relocated to a San Mateo office that overlooked the San Francisco Airport landing path.

When he incorporated the company, Hawkins originally chose Amazin' Software as their company name, but his other early employees of the company universally disliked the name; as a result, the company changed its name to Electronic Arts in November 1982. He scheduled an off-site meeting in the Pajaro Dunes, where the company once held such off-site meetings. Hawkins had developed the ideas of treating software as an art form and calling the developers "software artists". Hence, the latest version of the business plan suggested the name "SoftArt". Hawkins and Melmon knew the founders of Software Arts, the creators of VisiCalc, and thought their permission should be obtained. Dan Bricklin did not want the name used because it sounded too similar (perhaps "confusingly similar") to Software Arts; however, the name concept was liked by all the attendees. Hawkins had also recently read a bestselling book about the film studio United Artists and liked the reputation that the company had created. Hawkins said everyone had a vote, but they would lose it if they went to sleep.

Electronic Arts' original corporate logo, designed by Barry Deutsch, 1982–1999

Hawkins liked the word "electronic", and various employees had considered the phrases "Electronic Artists" and "Electronic Arts". When Gordon and others pushed for "Electronic Artists", in tribute to the film company United Artists, Steve Hayes opposed, saying, "We're not the artists, they [the developers] are..." This statement from Hayes immediately tilted sentiment towards Electronic Arts and the name was unanimously endorsed and adopted later in 1982. He recruited his original employees from Apple, Atari, Xerox PARC, and VisiCorp, and got Steve Wozniak to agree to sit on the board of directors. Hawkins was determined to sell directly to buyers. Combined with the fact that Hawkins was pioneering new game brands, this made sales growth more challenging. Retailers wanted to buy known brands from existing distribution partners. Former CEO Larry Probst arrived as VP of Sales in late 1984 and helped expand the already successful company. This policy of dealing directly with retailers gave EA higher margins and better market awareness, key advantages the company leveraged to leapfrog its early competitors.

Promoting its developers was a trademark of EA's early days. Games were sold in square packages modeled after album covers (such as those for 1983's M.U.L.E. and Pinball Construction Set). Hawkins thought the packaging would both save costs and convey an artistic feeling. EA routinely referred to their developers as "artists" and gave them photo credits in their games and full-page magazine ads. Their first such ad, accompanied by the slogan "We see farther," was the first video game advertisement to feature software designers. EA shared lavish profits with its developers, which added to its industry appeal.

The Amiga will revolutionize the home computer industry. It's the first home machine that has everything you want and need for all the major uses of a home computer, including entertainment, education and productivity. The software we're developing for the Amiga will blow your socks off. We think the Amiga, with its incomparable power, sound and graphics, will give Electronic Arts and the entire industry a very bright future.

— Trip Hawkins, 1985 Amiga advertisement

In the mid-1980s, Electronic Arts aggressively marketed products for the Amiga, a home computer introduced in 1985. Commodore had given EA development tools and prototype machines before Amiga's actual launch. For Amiga EA published some notable non-game titles. A drawing program Deluxe Paint (1985) and its subsequent versions became perhaps the most famous piece of software available for Amiga platform. In addition, EA's Jerry Morrison conceived the idea of a file format that could store images, animations, sounds, and documents simultaneously, and would be compatible with third-party software. He wrote and released to the public the Interchange File Format, which soon became an Amiga standard. Other Amiga programs released by EA included Deluxe Music Construction Set, Instant Music and Deluxe Paint Animation. Some of them, most notably Deluxe Paint, were ported to other platforms. For Macintosh EA released a black & white animation tool called Studio/1, and a series of Paint titles called Studio/8 and Studio/32 (1990).

Relationships between Electronic Arts and its external developers often became difficult when the latter missed deadlines or diverged from the former's creative directions. In 1987, EA released Skate or Die!, its first internally developed game. EA continued publishing its external developers' games while experimenting with its internal development strategy. This led to EA's decision of purchasing out a series of companies it identifies as successful, as well as the decision to release annualized franchises to cut budget costs. Because of Trip Hawkins' obsession of simulating a sports game, he signed a contract with football coach John Madden that led to EA's developing and releasing annual Madden NFL games.

In 1988, EA published a flight simulator game exclusively for Amiga, F/A-18 Interceptor, with filled-polygon graphics that were advanced for the time. Another significant Amiga release (also initially available for Atari ST, later converted for other platforms) was Populous (1989) developed by Bullfrog Productions. It was a pioneering title in the genre that was later called "god games". In 1990, Electronic Arts began producing console games for the Nintendo Entertainment System, after previously licensing its computer games to other console-game publishers.

On March 26, 1990, Electronic Arts filed for an IPO at the NASDAQ stock exchange and went public under the ticker symbol "ERTS", opening at a split-adjusted price of $0.52. The symbol was changed to "EA" on December 20, 2011.

=== 1991–2007: Larry Probst era, continuous expansion, and success into the new millennium ===
In 1991, Trip Hawkins stepped down as EA's CEO and was succeeded by Larry Probst. Hawkins went on to found the now-defunct 3DO Company, but still remained EA's chair until July 1994. In October 1993, 3DO developed the 3DO Interactive Multiplayer, which at the time was the most powerful game console. Once a critic of game consoles, Hawkins had conceived a console that unlike its competitors would not require a first-party license to be marketed and was intended to appeal to the PC market. Electronic Arts was the 3DO Company's primary partner in sponsoring its console, showcasing on it its latest games. With a retail price of US$700 (equivalent to $1,560.12 in 2025) compared to its competitors' $100, the console lagged in sales, and with the 1995 arrival to North America of Sony's PlayStation, a cheaper and more powerful alternative, combined with a lower quality of the 3DO's software library as a backfiring of its liberal license policy, it fell further behind and lost competition. Electronic Arts dropped its support for 3DO in favor of the PlayStation, 3DO's production ceased in 1996 and, for the remainder of the company's lifetime, 3DO developed video games for other consoles and the IBM PC until it folded in 2003.

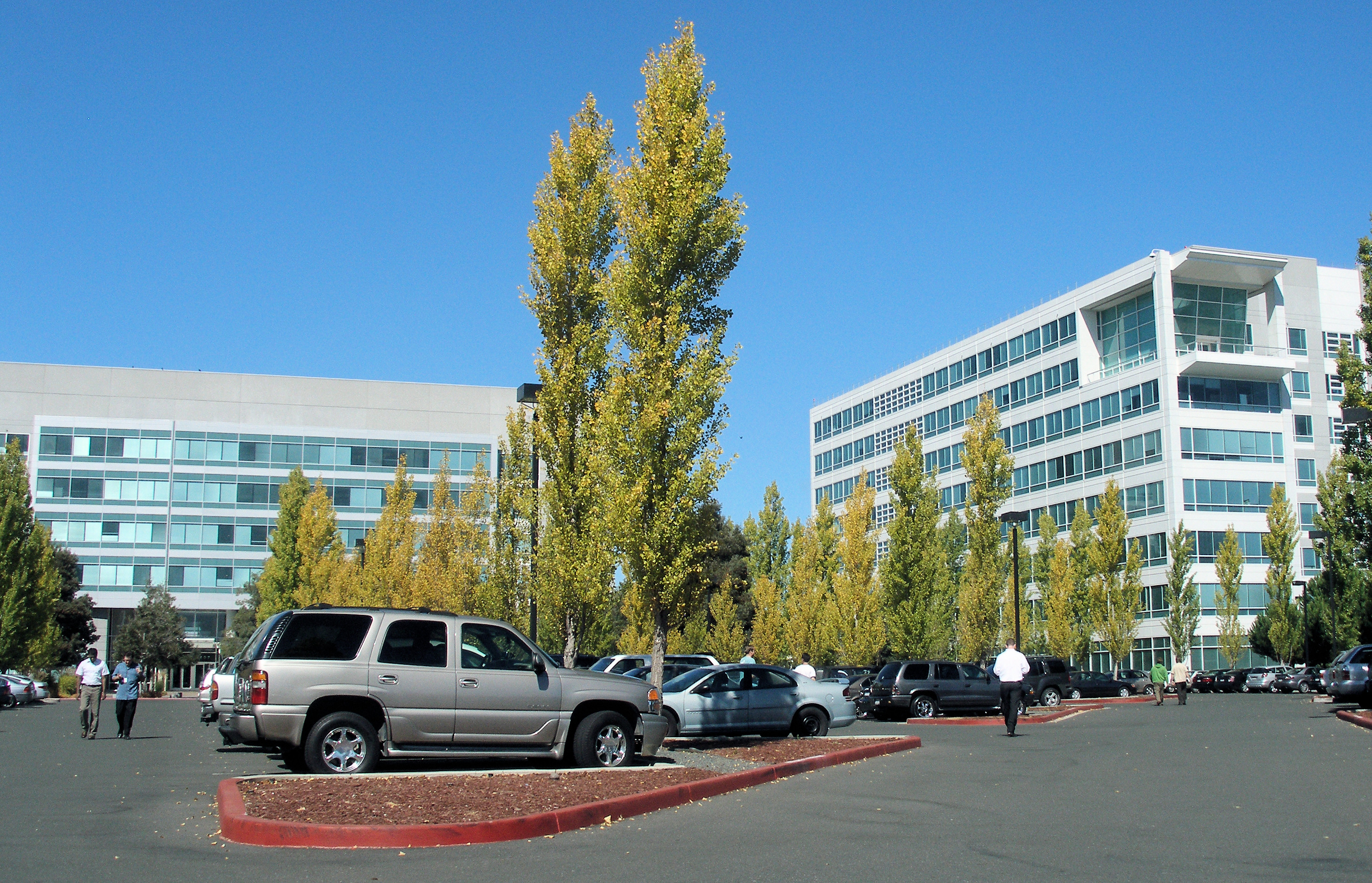
EA headquarters in October 2007

In 1994, Electronic Arts and THQ signed a licensing agreement to develop and release EA's titles, like John Madden Football, FIFA International Soccer, Shaq Fu, Jungle Strike and Urban Strike for various consoles. In 1995, Electronic Arts won the European Computer Trade Show award for best software publisher of the year. As the company was still expanding, it opted to purchase space in Redwood Shores, California in 1995 for construction of a new headquarters, which was completed in 1998. Early in 1997, Next Generation identified Electronic Arts as the only company to regularly profit from video games over the past five years, and noted it had "a critical track record second to none". In 2000, EA replaced its long-running Shapes logo with one based on the EA Sports logo used at the time. EA also started to use a brand-specific structure around this time, such as names like Westwood Studios, Maxis, Jane's Combat Simulations and Bullfrog Productions, as well as the short-lived label Gonzo Games with the main publishing side of the company (also known as Action and Entertainment) rebranding to EA Games in 2000. The EA Sports brand was retained for major sports titles, the new EA Sports Big label would be used for casual sports titles with an arcade twist, and the full Electronic Arts name would be used for co-published and distributed titles. EA began to move toward direct distribution of digital games and services with the acquisition of the popular online gaming site Pogo.com in 2001. In 2009, EA acquired the London-based social gaming startup Playfish.

In December 1997, Electronic Arts ended its Japanese publishing joint-venture with Victor Entertainment, entitled Electronic Arts Victor, and purchased out Victor's 35% stake in the venture. On May 1, 1998, Electronic Arts announced the formation of two joint-ventures with Square. The first; Electronic Arts Square K.K., would publish Electronic Arts' titles in Japan and also developed the PlayStation 2 launch title X-Squad. The second; Square Electronic Arts L.L.C., would publish Square's titles in North America. The venture was described as a success by Square, as it allowed the company to release more of its titles in the North American market. In February 2003, with the preparation of Square and Enix's merger into Square Enix; both partnerships were announced to be dissolved at the end of March with each partner buying the other's shares. Electronic Arts Square was renamed as Electronic Arts K.K. and began self-publishing EA's titles in Japan from then on while Square Electronic Arts was folded under Square Enix's North American operations.

In 2004, EA made a multimillion-dollar donation to fund the development of game production curriculum at the University of Southern California's Interactive Media Division. On February 1, 2006, Electronic Arts announced that it would cut worldwide staff by 5 percent. On June 20, 2006, EA purchased Mythic Entertainment, who are finished making Warhammer Online. After Sega's ESPN NFL 2K5 successfully grabbed market share away from EA's dominant Madden NFL series during the 2004 holiday season, EA responded by making several large sports licensing deals which include an exclusive agreement with the NFL, and in January 2005, a 15-year deal with ESPN. The ESPN deal gave EA exclusive first rights to all ESPN content for sports simulation games. On April 11, 2005, EA announced a similar, 6-year licensing deal with the Collegiate Licensing Company (CLC) for exclusive rights to college football content.

Much of EA's success, both in terms of sales and with regards to its stock market valuation, is due to its strategy of platform-agnostic development and the creation of strong multi-year franchises. EA was the first publisher to release yearly updates of its sports franchises—Madden, FIFA, NHL, NBA Live, Tiger Woods, etc.—with updated player rosters and small graphical and gameplay tweaks. Recognizing the risk of franchise fatigue among consumers, EA announced in 2006 that it would concentrate more of its effort on creating new original intellectual property. In September 2006, Nokia and EA announced a partnership in which EA becomes an exclusive major supplier of mobile games to Nokia mobile devices through the Nokia Content Discoverer. In the beginning, Nokia customers were able to download seven EA titles (Tetris, Tetris Mania, The Sims 2, Doom, FIFA 06, Tiger Woods PGA Tour 06 and FIFA Street 2) on the holiday season in 2006. Rick Simonson is the executive vice-president and director of Nokia and starting from 2006 is affiliated with John Riccitiello and are partners.

=== 2007–2013: John Riccitiello era, casual gaming and Origin's launch ===
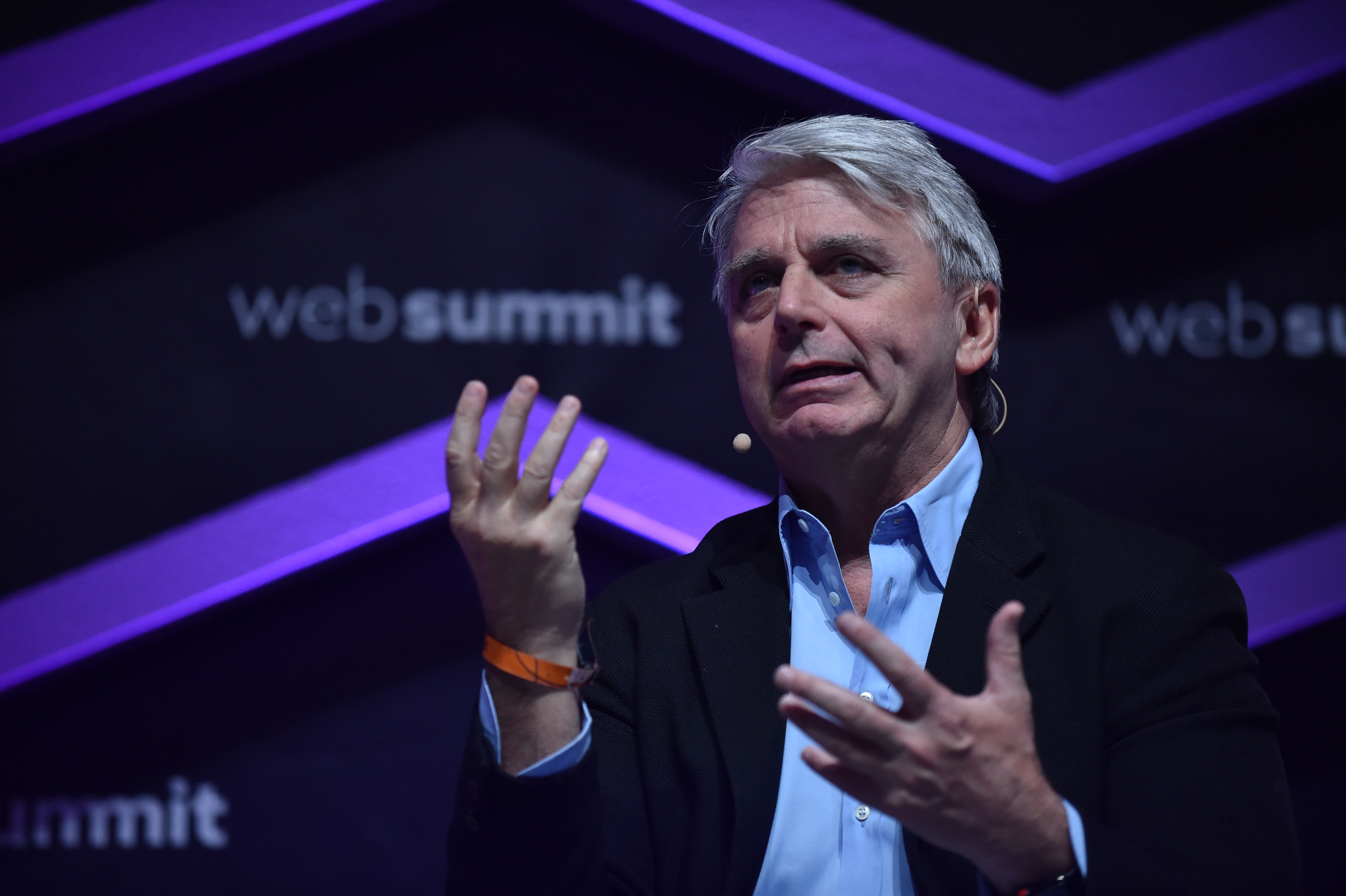
John Riccitiello at Web Summit 2017

In February 2007, Probst stepped down from the CEO job while remaining on the board of directors. His handpicked successor is John Riccitiello, who had worked at EA for several years previously, departed for a while, and then returned. Riccitiello previously worked for Elevation Partners, Sara Lee and PepsiCo. In June 2007, new CEO John Riccitiello announced that EA would reorganize itself into four labels, each with responsibility for its own product development and publishing (the city-state model). The goal of the reorganization was to empower the labels to operate more autonomously, streamline decision-making, increase creativity and quality, and get games into the market faster. This reorganization came after years of consolidation and acquisition by EA of smaller studios, which some in the industry blamed for a decrease in quality of EA titles. In 2008, at the DICE Summit, Riccitiello called the earlier approach of "buy and assimilate" a mistake, often stripping smaller studios of its creative talent. Riccitiello said that the city-state model allows independent developers to remain autonomous to a large extent, and cited Maxis and BioWare as examples of studios thriving under the new structure.

During 2007, EA announced that it would be bringing some of its major titles to the Mac. EA also released Battlefield 2142, Command & Conquer 3: Tiberium Wars, Crysis, Harry Potter and the Order of the Phoenix, Madden NFL 08, Need for Speed: Carbon, and Spore for the Mac. All of the new games have been developed for the Macintosh using Cider, a technology developed by TransGaming that enables Intel-based Macs to run Windows games inside a translation layer running on Mac OS X. They are not playable on PowerPC-based Macs.

In February 2008, it was revealed that Electronic Arts had made a takeover bid for rival game company Take-Two Interactive. After its initial offer of US$25 per share, all cash stock transaction offer was rejected by the Take-Two board, EA revised it to US$26 per share, a 64% premium over the previous day's closing price and made the offer known to the public. Rumours had been floating around the Internet prior to the offer about Take-Two possibly being bought over by a bigger company, albeit with Viacom as the potential bidder. In May 2008, EA announced that it would purchase the assets of Hands-On Mobile Korea, a South Korean mobile game developer and publisher. The company became EA Mobile Korea. In September 2008, EA dropped its buyout offer of Take-Two. No reason was given.

As of November 6, 2008, it was confirmed that Electronic Arts is closing its Casual Label & merging it with its Hasbro partnership with The Sims Label. EA also confirmed the departure of Kathy Vrabeck, who was given the position as former president of the EA Casual Division in May 2007. EA made this statement about the merger: "We've learned a lot about casual entertainment in the past two years, and found that casual gaming defies a single genre and demographic. With the retirement and departure of Kathy Vrabeck, EA is reorganizing to integrate casual games—development and marketing—into other divisions of our business. We are merging our Casual Studios, Hasbro partnership, and Casual marketing organization with The Sims Label to be a new Sims and Casual Label, where there is a deep compatibility in the product design, marketing and demographics. ... In the days and weeks ahead, we will make further announcements on the reporting structure for the other businesses in the Casual Label including EA Mobile, Pogo, Media Sales and Online Casual Initiatives. Those businesses remain growth priorities for EA and deserve strong support in a group that will complement their objectives." This statement comes a week after EA announced it was laying off 6% about 600 of its staff positions and had a US$310 million net loss for the quarter.

Due to the 2008 economic crisis, Electronic Arts had a poorer than expected 2008 holiday season, moving it in February 2009 to cut approximately 1,100 jobs, which it said represented about 11% of its workforce. It also closed 12 of its facilities. Riccitiello, in a conference call with reporters, stated that its poor performance in the fourth quarter was not due entirely to the poor economy, but also to the fact that it did not release any blockbuster titles in the quarter. In the quarter ending December 31, 2008, the company lost US$641 million. On February 2, 2009, Ludlum Entertainment had signed a deal with Electronic Arts to grant exclusive rights to bring the work of Robert Ludlum into video gaming. As of early May 2009, the subsidiary studio EA Redwood Shores was known as Visceral Games. On June 24, 2009, EA announced it would merge two of its development studios, BioWare and Mythic into one single role-playing video game and MMO development powerhouse. The move placed Mythic under control of BioWare as Ray Muzyka and Greg Zeschuk went in direct control of the new entity. By fall 2012, both Muzyka and Zeschuk had chosen to depart the merged entity in a joint retirement announcement.

On November 9, 2009, EA announced layoffs of 1,500 employees, representing 17% of its workforce, across a number of studios including EA Tiburon, Visceral Games, Mythic and EA Black Box. Also affected were "projects and support activities" that, according to Chief Financial Officer Eric Brown "don't make economic sense", resulting in the shutdown of popular communities such as Battlefield News and the EA Community Team. These layoffs also led to the complete shutdown of Pandemic Studios.

In October 2010, EA announced the acquisition of England-based iPhone and iPad games publisher Chillingo for US$20 million in cash. Chillingo published the popular Angry Birds for iOS and Cut the Rope for all platforms, but the deal did not include those properties, so Cut the Rope became published by ZeptoLab, and Angry Birds became published by Rovio Entertainment. On May 4, 2011, EA reported $3.8 billion in revenues for the fiscal year ending March 2011, and on January 13, 2012, EA announced that it had exceeded $1 billion in digital revenue during the previous calendar year. In a note to employees, EA CEO John Riccitiello called this "an incredibly important milestone" for the company.

In June 2011, EA launched Origin, an online service to sell downloadable games for personal computers directly to consumers. Around this time, Valve, which runs Steam in direct competition with Origin, announced changes to storefront policy disallowing games that used in-game purchases that were not tied to Steam's purchasing process, and removed several of EA's games, including Crysis 2, Dragon Age II, and Alice: Madness Returns in 2012. Although it released a new packaged version of Crysis 2 that included all the downloadable content without the storefront features, EA did not publish any additional games on Steam until 2019, instead selling all personal computer versions of games through Origin.

In July 2011, EA announced that it had acquired PopCap Games, the company behind games such as Plants vs. Zombies, Peggle and Bejeweled. EA continued its shift toward digital goods in 2012, folding its mobile-focused EA Interactive (EAi) division "into other organizations throughout the company, specifically those divisions led by EA Labels president Frank Gibeau, COO Peter Moore, and CTO Rajat Taneja, and EVP of digital Kristian Segerstrale."

=== 2013–2022: Andrew Wilson era, Disney partnership, and monetization ===
On March 18, 2013, John Riccitiello announced that he would be stepping down as CEO and a member of the Board of Directors on March 30, 2013. Larry Probst was also appointed executive chairman on the same day. Andrew Wilson was named as the new CEO of EA by September 2013. In April 2013, EA announced a reorganization which was to include dismissal of 10% of its workforce, consolidation of marketing functions which were distributed among the five label organizations, and subsumption of Origin operational leadership under the President of Labels. EA acquired the lucrative exclusive license to develop games within the Star Wars universe from Disney in May 2013, shortly after Disney's closure of its internal LucasArts game development in 2013. EA secured its license from 2013 through 2023, and began to assign new Star Wars projects across several of its internal studios, including BioWare, DICE, Visceral Games, Motive Studios, Capital Games and external developer Respawn Entertainment.

In April 2015, EA announced that it would be shutting down various free-to-play games in July of that year, including Battlefield Heroes, Battlefield Play4Free, Need for Speed: World, and FIFA World. The reorganization and revised marketing strategy lead to a gradual increase in stock value. In July 2015, Electronic Arts reached an all-time high with a stock value of US$71.63, surpassing the previous February 2005 record of $68.12. This is also up 54% from $46.57 in early January 2015. The surge was partly attributed to EA's then-highly anticipated Star Wars Battlefront reboot, which released one month before Star Wars: The Force Awakens, also highly anticipated.

During E3 2015, EA vice-president Patrick Söderlund announced that the company would start investing more on smaller titles such as Unravel so as to broaden the company's portfolio. On December 10, 2015, EA announced a new division called Competitive Gaming Division, which focuses on creating competitive game experience and organizing ESports events. It was once headed by Peter Moore. In May 2016, Electronic Arts announced that it had formed a new internal division called Frostbite Labs. The new department specializes in creating new projects for virtual reality platforms, and "virtual humans". The new department is located in Stockholm and Vancouver. EA announced the closure of Visceral Games in October 2017. Prior, Visceral had been supporting EA's other games but was also working on a Star Wars title named Project Ragtag since EA's acquisition of the Star Wars license, even hiring Amy Hennig to direct the project. While EA did not formally give a reason for the closure, industry pundits believed that EA was concerned about the principally single-player game which would be difficult to monetize, as well as the slow pace of development.

EA's original approach to the microtransactions in Star Wars Battlefront II sparked an industry-wide debate on the use of random-content loot boxes. While other games had used loot boxes, EA's original approach within Battlefront II from its early October 2017 launch included using such mechanics for pay to win gameplay elements, as well as locking various Star Wars characters behind expensive paywalls, leading several gaming journalists and players to complain. EA modified some of the costs of these elements in anticipation of the game's full November 2017 launch, but it was reportedly told by Disney to disable all microtransactions until it could come up with a fairer monetization scheme. By March 2018, EA had developed a fairer system that eliminated the pay to win elements and drastically reduced costs for unlocking characters. The controversy over Battlefront II's loot boxes led to an 8.5% drop in stock value in one month—about $3.1 billion and impacted EA's financial results for the following quarters. Furthermore, the visibility of this controversy led to debate at government levels around the world to determine if loot boxes were a form of gambling and if they should be regulated.

In January 2018, EA announced eMLS, a new competitive league for EA Sports' FIFA 18 through its Competitive Gaming Division (CGD) and MLS. That same month, EA teamed up with ESPN and Disney XD in a multi-year pact to broadcast Madden NFL competitive matches across the world through its Competitive Gaming Division arm. On August 14, 2018, Patrick Söderlund announced his departure from EA as its vice-president and chief design officer, after serving twelve years with the company. With Söderlund's departure, the SEED group was moved as part of EA's studios, while the EA Originals and EA Partners teams were moved under the company's Strategic Growth group.

On February 6, 2019, Electronic Arts' stock value was hit by a decline of 13.3%, the worst decline since Halloween 2008. This was largely due to the marketing of its anticipated title Battlefield V, which was released after the holiday season of October 2018. Stocks were already declining since late August, when EA announced that Battlefield V's release would be delayed until November. Upon release, the game was met with a mixed reception, and EA sold one million fewer copies than its expected figure of 7.3 million. Also attributed to the stock plunge was the game's lack of the game mode Battle Royale, popularized by PlayerUnknown's Battlegrounds and then Fortnite. Stocks then surged 9.6% with the surprise release of Apex Legends, which garnered 25 million players in just one week, significantly surpassing Fortnite's record of 10 million players in two weeks. In advance of the end of its financial quarter ending March 31, 2019, Wilson announced it was cutting about 350 jobs, or about 4% of its workforce, primarily from its marketing, publishing, and operations divisions. Wilson stated the layoffs were necessary to "address our challenges and prepare for the opportunities ahead".

EA announced in October 2019 that it would be returning to release games on Steam, starting with the November 2019 release of Star Wars: Jedi Fallen Order, as well as bringing the EA Access subscription service to Steam. While EA plans to continue to sell games on Origin, the move to add Steam releases was to help get more consumers to see its offerings. Due to COVID-19 lockdowns and growing demand for online games, EA's revenue grew to $1.4 billion in the first quarter of 2020. EA rebranded both EA Access and Origin to EA Play on August 18, 2020, but otherwise without changing the subscription price or services offered as part of a streamlining effort. In December 2020, EA placed a bid to buy Codemasters, a British developer of racing games, in a deal worth $1.2 billion, outbidding an earlier offer placed by Take-Two Interactive. The acquisition, agreed to by Codemasters, was completed by February 18, 2021, with all shares of Codemasters transferred to Codex Games Limited, a subsidiary of EA. Wilson stated that "the franchises in our combined portfolio will enable us to create innovative new experiences and bring more players into the excitement of cars and motorsport".

In January 2021, Disney announced it had revived the Lucasfilm Games label for its licensed video game properties and announced new games including a new Star Wars game that would be developed by Ubisoft aimed for release in 2023, indicating that EA's ten-year exclusive license in 2013 to the Star Wars property was likely not extended. EA still maintained a non-exclusive license to Star Wars games, affirming more titles would be coming following this announcement. As of February 2021, EA's Star Wars games had sold more than 52 million copies and brought in more than $3 billion in revenue. After a six-year absence from producing college sports-based game due to legal issues related to student athlete likenesses with the NCAA, EA announced in February 2021 that it was returning to college sports with a planned EA Sports College Football title to likely be released in 2023. The company announced its plans to extend its mobile commitment in February 2021 by acquiring Glu Mobile in a deal estimated worth $2.1 billion. The acquisition was completed by the end of April 2021.

The Public Investment Fund of Saudi Arabia acquired 7.4 million shares of EA, valued at $1.1 billion, in February 2021. Former CEO and current chairman Probst stated in May 2021 he was retiring from the company. Current EA CEO Wilson took over as chairman. In June 2021, EA confirmed that it had suffered a data breach, with game and engine source code taken from its servers, including the source for the Frostbite Engine and FIFA 21; EA assured no player or user data had been obtained. Hackers that had taken the code had started selling it around on the dark web. The perpetuators of this breach began to extort EA for money in July, releasing small portions of the data to public forums and threatening to release more if their demands were not met.

EA acquired mobile game developer Playdemic Studios in Manchester, England from Warner Bros. Interactive Entertainment in June 2021 for $1.4 billion, following the merger of Discovery, Inc. with WarnerMedia. As of June 2021, the acquisition was expected to complete by 2022. In its SEC filings in September 2021, the company said that current CFO and COO Blake Jorgensen would be stepping down by mid-2022. The company's COO role was taken over by Chief Studios Officer Laura Miele, while a search for a new CFO was launched. Longtime Microsoft executive Chris Suh was later appointed as CFO in March 2022. Industry reports around May 2022 asserted that EA had been looking to be acquired by larger media firms, including Disney, Apple, and Comcast/NBCUniversal. These reports said that EA had been nearing a final deal that would have had NBCUniversal spun out from Comcast before bringing EA within it. Amazon was also mentioned as a possible customer for EA; CNBC reported in late August that Amazon was no longer interested in a takeover.

=== 2023–2025: Internal restructuring and layoffs ===
In January 2023, EA cancelled development on Apex Legends Mobile and Battlefield Mobile, leading to the shutdown of developer Industrial Toys. On February 28, 2023, EA eliminated 200 QA testers from its Baton Rouge, Louisiana office. The testers predominantly worked on Respawn Entertainment's Apex Legends battle royale game. On March 29, EA announced it would lay off 6% of its workforce, or 775 employees.

In June 2023, EA announced an internal reorganization of the company. CEO Andrew Wilson announced a realignment of the company into two organizations – EA Sports and EA Entertainment – both of which would report directly to him, having Laura Miele, previously Chief Studios Officer and COO, as the president of EA Entertainment, and Cam Weber, formerly EVP and group general manager of EA Sports as president of EA Sports. Vince Zampella, Samantha Ryan, and Jeff Karp continued on EA Entertainment, leading and overseeing specific studios under EA Entertainment. Also announced in the same day, CFO Chris Suh and chief experience officer Chris Bruzzo would be leaving the company at the end of the month, with the first leaving for another company while the other going to retire. In place of Suh as CFO came Stuart Canfield, a 20-year veteran of the company who had most recently been serving as SVP of enterprise finance and investor relations, while the company's new chief experiences officer became David Tinson, previously the company's chief marketing officer.

On August 23, EA announced it was eliminating 50 roles at BioWare, or 20% of its workforce. A group of former employees later sued EA, seeking better severance following its layoffs.

In December 2023, EA laid off an unknown number of Codemasters employees. In February 2024, EA announced that it would lay off 670 employees, or 5% of its global workforce. The cuts came with the cancellation of a first-person shooter set in the Star Wars universe, and that the company would be moving away from licensed IP in favor of EA-owned franchises.

In July 2024, actor labor union Screen Actors Guild-American Federation of Television and Radio Artists (SAG-AFTRA), which also has numerous video game voice actors as members, would initiate a labor strike against a number of video publishers, including EA, over concerns about lack of A.I. protections not only for video game actors, but also the use of A.I to replicate an actor's voice, or create a digital replica of their likeness.

In January 2025, EA lowered its upcoming annual revenue forecast due to the underperformance of both EA Sports FC 25 (September 2024) and Dragon Age: The Veilguard (October 2024). Bloomberg reported that "EA pinned most of the blame on its soccer title". Later that month, EA restructured and downsized BioWare; the studio "is now down from more than 200 people two years ago to less than 100". PC Gamer highlighted that "well-known BioWare veterans" are no longer at the company and "collectively, the cuts represent a major loss of creative talent for the studio, and bears echoes of BioWare's layoff of roughly 50 employees in 2023".

In April 2025, EA laid off around 300 employees as part of a company-wide restructuring. Roughly 100 roles were cut from Respawn Entertainment following the cancellation of two early-stage projects, including a Titanfall universe extraction shooter. The move was part of EA's strategy to focus on high-impact titles and long-term growth. In May, EA made further layoffs at Codemasters and paused further development within the World Rally Championship series. On May 28, EA shut down Cliffhanger Games and cancelled its Black Panther game.

=== 2025–present: Leveraged buyout ===
EA announced on September 29, 2025, that it has reached a $55 billion deal to go private with the help of a group of investors, including Saudi Arabia's Public Investment Fund (PIF), Silver Lake and Jared Kushner's Affinity Partners, subject to regulatory approval and stockholders, and was expected to complete by June 2026. Of the total price, $20 billion was backed by loans from JPMorgan Chase, with the rest covered by equity. The Financial Times said that the buyout is not expected to hit any regulatory hurdles, in part due to the political climate in the United States due to Kushner, who is US president Donald Trump's son-in-law, and has a good relationship with the Saudis. The Financial Times also reported that, as part of the buyout transition and to cover the debt, the new owners plan to significantly reduce operating costs by incorporating artificial intelligence throughout the company.

Analysts said that the buyout was likely driven by Saudi Arabia's intention to become a leader in esports; the PIF already had a 9.9% share of EA before the buyout, and EA's properties like Madden and FIFA have been very lucrative titles for both esports and revenues. The Wall Street Journal reported that following the proposed buyout the PIF would own the bulk of EA shares at 93.4% ownership, while Silver Lake and Affinity Partners would hold minor stakes of 5.5% and 1.1% retrospectively. Others expressed concern that with Saudi control, content of new EA games would be restricted by the cultural values of Saudi Arabia, potential limiting LGBTQ+ content in games like The Sims or Mass Effect, even though Wilson said that EA's core values would remain unchanged by the buyout. Analysts and EA employees also expressed concern that there would be layoffs and studio divestment as part of the acquisition, following several years of layoffs in the video game industry, as such trimming would be necessary to assure profitability to pay off the debt being used in the buyout. The company has told its staff there are no immediate plans for staff reduction, and that EA would retain creative control on its games products after the buyout.

U.S. senators Richard Blumenthal and Elizabeth Warren raised questions with U.S. treasury secretary Scott Bessent, who also serves on Committee on Foreign Investment in the United States, on the buyout in October 2025. They were concerned how the deal would address security risks and foreign control of EA, as well as the connection between Affinity Partners and PIF, given Kushner's previous deals with PIF. The two also asked similar questions of EA's Wilson, questioning if EA will retain its identity after the buyout, as well as the impact of the financial gain that EA's executives would get with the completion of the buyout. The United Videogame Workers-CWA called on regulators and lawmakers to give high scrutiny before approving of the buyout, claiming that the EA employees had no input into the buyout but would be the ones most affected if the buyout succeeded.

EA's shareholders approved the buyout in December 2025. The European Commission approved the buyout in July 2026, saying it "would not raise competition concerns, given its limited impact on competition in the markets where the companies are active." In June 2026, EA launched EA Advertising, a program allowing advertisers to place real-time ads in EA video games. The acquisition was completed on August 4, 2026, with EA stockholders receiving $210 in cash per share, after which EA's common stock was delisted from the Nasdaq and removed from the Nasdaq-100 and S&P 500 indices. The deal is the largest leveraged buyout to date, exceeding the $32 billion buyout of TXU Energy in 2007.

Bloomberg News reported in September 2026 that the PIF was considering merging Electronic Arts with its Savvy Games Group to create a global gaming giant. The plan was still in development and would not occur until at least after the planned acquisition of Chinese mobile developer Moonton.

== Games ==
Since 1983 and the 1987 release of Skate or Die!, Electronic Arts has respectively published and developed games, bundles, as well as a handful of earlier productivity software.

== Company structure ==
As of April 2021, Electronic Arts' largest acquisition is the purchase of Glu Mobile, for $2.4 billion. Of the 39 companies acquired by EA, 20 are based in the United States, five in the United Kingdom, six in continental Europe, and eight elsewhere. The majority of these companies and studios are now defunct, with some having been merged into other entities. Of the six companies which EA purchased a stake in, two remaining companies are based in the United States, while three other American companies are defunct. After acquiring a 19.9% stake in France-based Ubisoft in 2004, EA sold a remaining 14.8% stake in it in 2010. Since June 2023, the company is organized in two main divisions: EA Entertainment Technology & Central Development (EA Entertainment for short, formerly EA Games) and EA Sports.

=== EA Entertainment ===
- Battlefield Studios; established in 2024.
  - Criterion Games in Guildford, England; acquired in August 2004.
    - Criterion Cheshire in Cheshire, England
  - DICE in Stockholm, Sweden; acquired in October 2006.
    - Frostbite Labs in Stockholm, Sweden and Vancouver, Canada; founded in May 2016.
  - Motive Studio in Montreal, Canada; founded in July 2015.
    - Motive Studio Vancouver in Burnaby, Canada; founded in June 2018.
  - Ripple Effect Studios in Los Angeles, California; established in May 2013, previously a subsidiary of DICE called DICE Los Angeles, and a support studio before becoming its own company and being renamed in 2021. Some of the staff were originally from Danger Close Games.
- EA Baton Rouge in Baton Rouge, Louisiana; founded in September 2008.
- EA Galway in Galway, Ireland.
- EA Gothenburg in Gothenburg, Sweden; founded in March 2011. From March 2011 to November 2012, the studio was named EA Gothenburg. From November 2012 to January 2020, the studio was named Ghost Games, until the original name came back.
- EA Korea Studio in Seoul, South Korea; founded in 1998.
- EA Mobile in Los Angeles, California; founded in 2004.
  - EA Capital Games in Sacramento, California; acquired in 2011. From 2011 to 2014, the studio was named BioWare Sacramento.
  - EA Redwood Studios in Redwood City, California; founded in 2016.
  - Firemonkeys Studios in Melbourne, Australia; acquired in July 2012.
  - Glu Mobile in San Francisco, California; acquired in April 2021.
    - PlayFirst in Delaware; acquired by Glu in September 2014.
  - Playdemic in Manchester, England; acquired by EA in June 2021 from WarnerMedia.
  - Slingshot Games in Hyderabad, India.
  - Tracktwenty Studios in Helsinki, Finland; founded in 2012.
- Full Circle in Vancouver, Canada; opened in 2021.
- Maxis in Redwood City, California; acquired in July 1997.
  - Maxis Texas in Austin, Texas was opened in 2019 and working on a new IP.
  - Maxis Europe in multiple locations in Europe, was opened in 2021.
- Pogo Studios in New York City; acquired in March 2001.
- PopCap Games in Seattle, Washington; acquired in July 2011.
  - PopCap Shanghai in Shanghai, China; acquired in July 2011.
  - PopCap Hyderabad in Hyderabad, India; acquired in July 2011.
- Respawn Entertainment in Sherman Oaks, California; acquired in December 2017.
  - Respawn Vancouver established in 2020 in Vancouver.
  - Respawn Wisconsin established in 2023 in Madison, Wisconsin.

=== EA Sports ===
- Codemasters in Southam, England; founded in October 1986, acquired by EA in February 2021.
  - Codemasters Birmingham in Birmingham, England
  - Codemasters Kuala Lumpur in Kuala Lumpur, Malaysia
- EA Cologne in Cologne, Germany
- EA Madrid in Madrid, Spain; founded in October 2018.
- EA Orlando in Orlando, Florida; acquired in April 1998.
- EA Romania in Bucharest, Romania; acquired in 2006.
- EA Vancouver in Burnaby, Canada; acquired in 1991.
- Metalhead Software in Victoria, British Columbia; acquired in May 2021.

=== Former ===
- BioWare in Edmonton, Canada; acquired in October 2007, closed in October 2026.
- BioWare Austin in Austin, Texas; acquired in October 2007, closed in October 2026.
- BioWare Montreal in Montreal, Canada; founded in March 2009, the studio merged into Motive Studio in August 2017.
- BioWare San Francisco in San Francisco, California; founded as EA2D, the studio was renamed in August 2011 and closed in March 2013.
- Bullfrog Productions in Guildford, England; acquired in January 1995, the studio closed in 2001.
- Cliffhanger Games in Seattle, Washington, led by Kevin Stephens formerly vice-president of Monolith Productions, founded in May 2021, studio closed in May 2025.
- Codemasters Cheshire in Cheshire, England; merged with Criterion Games in May 2022.
- Danger Close Games in Los Angeles, California; acquired in February 2000, the studio closed in June 2013.
- EA Baltimore in Baltimore, Maryland; founded in 1998, the studio closed in 2002.
- EA Black Box in Burnaby, Canada; acquired in June 2002 as Black Box Games, later rebranded as EA Black Box. The studio closed in April 2013.
- EA Bright Light in Guildford, England; founded in 1995 as EA UK, the studio was renamed in 2008 and closed in October 2011.
- EA Chicago in Hoffman Estates, Illinois; founded in February 2004, the studio closed in November 2007.
- EA Chillingo in Macclesfield, England; acquired in October 2010, reduced to bare staff in 2017 to primarily support mobile publishing, dissolved in June 2023.
- EA Japan, office closed in March 2019.
- EA North Carolina in Morrisville, North Carolina; the studio closed in September 2013.
- EA Pacific in Irvine, California; the studio was acquired in August 1998 as Westwood Pacific, the studio was renamed in 2002 and closed in 2003.
- EA Phenomic in Ingelheim am Rhein, Germany; the studio was acquired in August 2006 and closed in July 2013.
- EA Salt Lake in Salt Lake City, Utah; the studio was acquired in December 2006 and closed in April 2017.
- EA Seattle in Seattle, Washington; the studio was acquired in January 1996 and closed in 2002.
- Easy Studios in Stockholm, Sweden; the studio was founded in 2008 and closed in March 2015.
- Firemint in Melbourne, Australia; the studio was acquired in May 2011 and merged with Iron Monkey Studios to become Firemonkeys Studios in July 2012.
- Hypnotix in Little Falls, New Jersey; acquired in July 2005, the studio was merged into EA Tiburon.
- Iron Monkey Studios in Sydney, Australia; the studio was acquired in May 2011 and merged with Firemint to become Firemonkeys Studios in July 2012.
- Industrial Toys in Pasadena, California; acquired in July 2018, shut down in January 2023.
- Kesmai in Charlottesville, Virginia; the studio was acquired in 1999 and closed in 2001.
- Mythic Entertainment in Fairfax, Virginia; acquired in July 2006 as EA Mythic, the studio became Mythic Entertainment in July 2008, then BioWare Mythic in June 2009 and again Mythic Entertainment in 2012. The studio closed in May 2014.
- NuFX in Hoffman Estates, Illinois; the studio was acquired in February 2004 and closed in the same year.
- Origin Systems in Austin, Texas; the studio was acquired in September 1992 and closed in February 2004.
- Pandemic Studios in Los Angeles, California and Brisbane, Australia; the studio was acquired in October 2007 and closed in November 2009.
- Playfish in London, England; the studio was acquired in 2009 and closed in June 2013.
- Quicklime Games; closed in April 2013.
- Ridgeline Games in Seattle, Washington founded in October 2021, closed in February 2024.
- Uprise in Uppsala, Sweden; founded as Uprise and acquired in 2012 as ESN. From 2014, the studio was named Uprise again. It merged into DICE Stockholm in 2019.
- Victory Games in Los Angeles, California; founded in February 2011 as BioWare Victory, the studio was renamed in November 2012 and closed in October 2013.
- Visceral Games in Redwood City, California; founded in 1998 as EA Redwood Shores, the studio was renamed in 2009 and closed in October 2017.
- Waystone Games in Redwood City, California; the studio closed in November 2014.
- Westwood Studios in Las Vegas, Nevada; the studio was acquired in August 1998 and closed in March 2003.

=== Labels ===
==== EA Sports ====
First introduced in 1991 as the Electronic Arts Sports Network, before being renamed due to a trademark dispute with ESPN, EA Sports publishes all the sports games from EA, including FC, Madden NFL, Fight Night, NBA Live, NCAA Football, Cricket, NCAA March Madness, Tiger Woods PGA Tour, NHL, NASCAR and Rugby. FIFA is a discontinued series of EA Sports. In 2011, Forbes ranked EA Sports eighth on its list of most valuable sports brands, with a value of $625 million.

==== EA All Play ====
EA All Play is a mobile-oriented label that, since 2012, publishes digital titles like The Simpsons', Tetris, and Battlefield, as well as Hasbro board games like Scrabble.

==== EA Competitive Gaming Division ====
The EA Competitive Gaming Division (CGD), founded in 2015 by Peter Moore and currently headed by Todd Sitrin, is the group dedicated on enabling global eSports competitions on EA's biggest franchises including FIFA, Madden NFL, Battlefield and more.

==== SEED ====
The Search for Extraordinary Experiences Division (SEED) was revealed at the 2017 Electronic Entertainment Expo as a technology research division and incubator, using tools like deep learning and neural networks to bring in player experiences and other external factors to help them develop more immersive narratives and games. SEED has offices in Los Angeles and Stockholm.

==== Former labels ====
- EA Kids — A label for educational titles. In January 1995, EA sold the label to and in conjunction with Capital Cities/ABC formed the independent ABC/EA Home Software, which was later absorbed into Creative Wonders in that year's May. In October 1997, EA and ABC sold Creative Wonders to The Learning Company for $40 million.
- EA Sports Big — A label used from 2000 to 2008 for arcade-styled sports games.
- EA Sports Freestyle — A short-lived replacement for EA Sports Big used from 2008 to 2009, which focused exclusively on casual sports games, regardless of genre. Later arcade and extreme sports game released by EA, such as SSX (2012), NFL Blitz (2012), NBA Jam (2010), and the Skate series used the EA Sports or EA label instead.
- Electronic Arts Studios
- EA Games- A label used for non-sports games between 2000 and 2005. In 2005 the label was dropped and non-sports games used an EA label instead.

== Partnership and initiatives ==
=== EA Partners program (1997–present) ===
EA Partners' co-publishing program was dedicated to publishing and distributing games developed by third-party developers. EA Partners began as EA Distribution, formed in 1997 and led by Tom Frisina, a former executive from Accolade and Three-Sixty who helped both companies find third-party developers as to provide publishing support for them. Frisina's early partners included Looking Glass Studios, MGM Interactive for the rights to the James Bond property, DreamWorks Interactive, and eventually DICE; in the latter two cases, these studios were acquired by EA as part of the EA DICE family. In 2003, EA's president John Riccitiello pushed for a renaming of the EA Distribution label, seeing the potential to bring in more independent developers and additional revenue streams. While they rebranded the label as EA Partners in 2003, Riccitiello left EA the following year, which disrupted the direction the label had been aiming to go.

Oddworld Inhabitants, who had signed on with EA Partner for its next Oddworld games, found the situation difficult as EA Partners was reluctant to support games where it did not own the intellectual property rights and instead favored internal development. The situation with EA Partners switched gears in 2005 after EA and Valve signed an EA Partners deal for the physical distribution of The Orange Box; EA Partners realized it needed to be flexible to handle the different publishing opportunities presented to them. A similar breakthrough was reached with signing on Harmonix for the distribution of the Rock Band games, requiring them to work closely with MTV Games on the plastic instrument controllers necessary for the titles. A number of major partnerships were made over the next few years, including Namco Bandai, Crytek, Starbreeze Studios, id Software, Epic Games and People Can Fly, Double Fine Productions, Grasshopper Manufacture, Spicy Horse, and Realtime Worlds. While many of these partnerships proved successful, the division had two major marks on its name. It was associated with the situation around Kingdoms of Amalur: Reckoning developed by 38 Studios, which had been significantly backed by loans from taxpayer funds from the state of Rhode Island. Kingdoms failed to be commercially successful, and EA Partners pulled out of making a sequel, leaving 38 Studios in default of its loan payback to the state. Secondly, while The Secret World from Funcom launched as a subscription game, Funcom had to switch their monetization model to free-to-play to improve their revenues, which further affected EA Partners.

Around April 2013, as part of a large 1000-employee layoff, many reporters claimed that EA Partners was also being shut down for its poor commercial performance, but the program remained active as the company refocused its efforts. Game Informer reported anonymous sources said the label would shut down. Respawn Entertainment's first game and Insomniac Games' Fuse were upcoming under EA Partners. The label remained dormant over the next several years, while Letts expanded on the EA Originals program, but following the move of EA Partners and EA Originals into the Strategic Growth group in August 2018, the label was revived on the March 2019 with a publishing deal with Velan Studios, which ended up releasing under Originals as Knockout City.

Notable publishing/distribution agreements include:

- Alice: Madness Returns – Spicy Horse
- APB – Realtime Worlds
- Brütal Legend – Double Fine Productions
- Bulletstorm – Epic Games
- Crysis series – Crytek
- DeathSpank – Hothead Games
- Fuse – Insomniac Games
- Hellgate: London – Flagship Studios
- Kingdoms of Amalur: Reckoning – 38 Studios, Big Huge Games
- Rock Band series – Harmonix and MTV Games
- The Secret World – Funcom
- The Orange Box – Valve Corporation
- Shadows of the Damned – Grasshopper Manufacture
- Shank and Shank 2 – Klei Entertainment
- Syndicate – Starbreeze Studios
- Warp – Trapdoor

=== EA Originals label (2017–present) ===
EA Originals is a label within Electronic Arts own EA Partners program to help support independently developed video games. EA funds the money for development, and once it recoups that, all additional revenue goes to the partner studio that created the game. That studio also gets to keep the intellectual property rights for whatever it creates, and even has creative control over the project. The program was announced at EA's press event at the 2016 E3 Conference, and builds upon the success it had with Unravel from Coldwood Interactive in 2015. The first game to be supported under this program was Fe by Zoink, released in 2018. It was followed by A Way Out from Hazelight Studios, Unravel Two from Coldwood Interactive and Sea of Solitude from Jo-Mei Games.

In 2019, during its EA Play event, EA teased three new titles. Among the games featured were Lost in Random from Zoink and an unnamed title from Hazelight Studios. It was also announced that Glowmade would be entering the initiative with a title called RustHeart. In June 2020, Hazelight Studios' untitled project was revealed as It Takes Two and was released the following year to critical acclaim.

In February 2023, Jeff Gamon, general manager of EA Partners, which oversees the Originals label, said the label would invest on bigger games, although for those cases the deal would not be as generous as the smaller games, as those are larger companies. Gamon said that the company still plans to release smaller and niche games, and do not want to completely abandon its roots. One such title, Wild Hearts was developed by Koei Tecmo's Omega Force; it was released in 2023 under the Originals label. Immortals of Aveum was released the same year.

In December 2023, EA announced Tales of Kenzera: Zau under the Originals label. In December 2024, EA announced Split Fiction under the Originals label as its third collaboration with Hazelight Studios.

List of EA Originals games
Year	Title	Developer	Platform(s)
2016	Unravel	Coldwood Interactive	Microsoft Windows, PlayStation 4, Xbox One
2018	Fe	Zoink	Microsoft Windows, Nintendo Switch, PlayStation 4, Xbox One
2018	A Way Out	Hazelight Studios	Microsoft Windows, PlayStation 4, Xbox One
2019	Unravel Two	Coldwood Interactive	Microsoft Windows, Nintendo Switch, PlayStation 4, Xbox One
2019	Sea of Solitude	Jo-Mei Games	Microsoft Windows, Nintendo Switch, PlayStation 4, Xbox One
2020	Rocket Arena	Final Strike Games	Microsoft Windows, PlayStation 4, Xbox One
2021	It Takes Two	Hazelight Studios	Microsoft Windows, PlayStation 4, PlayStation 5, Xbox One, Xbox Series X/S, Nintendo Switch
2021	Knockout City (Note: Publishing duties moved to Velan Studios in 2022)	Velan Studios	Microsoft Windows, Nintendo Switch, PlayStation 4, PlayStation 5, Xbox One, Xbox Series X/S
2021	Lost in Random	Zoink	Microsoft Windows, Nintendo Switch, PlayStation 4, PlayStation 5, Xbox One, Xbox Series X/S
2023	Wild Hearts	Omega Force	Microsoft Windows, PlayStation 5, Xbox Series X/S
2023	Immortals of Aveum	Ascendant Studios	Microsoft Windows, PlayStation 5, Xbox Series X/S
2024	Tales of Kenzera: Zau	Surgent Studios	Microsoft Windows, Nintendo Switch, PlayStation 5, Xbox Series X/S
2025	Split Fiction	Hazelight Studios	Microsoft Windows, PlayStation 5, Xbox Series X/S
TBA	RustHeart	Glowmade	

== Criticism and controversies ==
Since the mid-2010s, Electronic Arts has been in the center of numerous controversies involving acquisitions of companies and alleged anti-consumerist practices in its individual games, as well as lawsuits alleging EA's anti-competition when signing sports-related contracts.
