= Sahlin =

Sahlin is a Swedish surname.

== Geographical distribution ==
As of 2014, 77.4% of all known bearers of the surname Sahlin were residents of Sweden (frequency 1:2,898), 16.5% of the United States (1:499,656), 1.8% of Norway (1:65,928), 1.1% of Finland (1:116,953) and 1.0% of Canada (1:855,768).

In Sweden, the frequency of the surname was higher than national average (1:2,898) in the following counties:

1. Jämtland County (1:763)
2. Västernorrland County (1:827)
3. Västmanland County (1:1,562)
4. Gävleborg County (1:2,222)
5. Västra Götaland County (1:2,558)

== People ==
- Anna Sahlin (born 1976), Swedish singer
- Dan Sahlin (born 1967), Swedish former professional football forward who won three caps for his country.
- Don Sahlin (1928–1978), Muppet designer and builder who worked for Jim Henson from 1962 to 1977
- Ivar Sahlin (1895–1980), Swedish track and field athlete who competed in the 1920 Summer Olympics.
- Margit Sahlin (1914–2003), one of the first three female priests in the Church of Sweden.
- Martin Sahlin, director of the video games Unravel and Unravel Two.
- Mona Sahlin (born 1957), Swedish politician and the former leader of the Swedish Social Democratic Party.
