= Battlefield Play4Free =

- Developer: Easy Studios
- Publisher: Electronic Arts
- Designer: Colin Clarke
- Series: Battlefield
- Engine: Refractor 2
- Platform: Microsoft Windows
- Release: 4 April 2011 (open beta)
- Genre: First-person shooter
- Mode: Multiplayer

Battlefield Play4Free was a first-person shooter video game developed by Easy Studios and published by Electronic Arts. It was the eleventh installment in the Battlefield series, the game featured a modern warfare battlefield setting. Play4Free was built on a modified version of Battlefield 2's game engine, with improvements such as high resolution artwork and post-processing effects. The game was also less demanding on computer specifications, similar to Battlefield Heroes.

The game was available to players for free online, under Electronic Arts' free-to-play model called Play4Free. Play4Free uses a similar micropayment store system similar to that in Battlefield Heroes. Battlefield Play4Free was announced on 5 November 2010. The game's open beta testing phase began on 4 April. Closed beta codes originally started being distributed via email on 30 November 2010. The game was released as an open beta on 4 April 2011. Battlefield Play4Free, along with other EA free-to-play titles Battlefield Heroes, Need for Speed: World, and FIFA World, went offline on 14 July 2015.

Since November 2026 the game is avaible online via independent project under the name Phoenix Play4Free.

== Gameplay ==
Battlefield Play4Free screenshot showing an American engineer with a PP-2000 submachine gun

Battlefield Play4Free featured content from both Battlefield 2 and Battlefield: Bad Company 2. Battlefield included two gameplay modes, Assault and Rush. The game had a leveling system, in-game shop, and gameplay customization similar to that of Battlefield Heroes. Battlefield Play4Free featured sixteen vehicles, eight maps from Battlefield 2 and supported up to 32-player servers for online battles. Players were randomly chosen to play as soldiers from either the Russian Ground Forces or the United States Marine Corps.

=== Classes ===
Battlefield Play4Free featured a class system, which was similar to the class systems of previous Battlefield games. The player could choose between Assault, Medic, Engineer, and Recon. The Assault class was armed with an assault rifle and an "Ammo Box," which could be used to resupply the player and teammates with more ammunition. Medics had a light machine gun and were able to heal themselves and other players with a "Medic Box" as well as being able to revive other players with a defibrillator. Engineer class soldiers were equipped with an RPG-7, a submachine gun, and a repair tool that could be used to fix teammates' vehicles. Lastly, the Recon class utilized a sniper rifle, motion sensor, and M18 Claymore mines. The four classes also had the ability to wield a shotgun and a tracer dart gun, which was not class-specific. This class system has been used in Battlefield: Bad Company 2.

=== Updates ===
Easy Studios, the developer of Battlefield Play4Free, regularly performed updates to the game. The first major update took place on 29 January 2011, when Easy Studios launched Oman. Then, the developers released Sharqi Peninsula on 4 April 2011, the same day that the game went to open beta. On 9 June 2011, Basra, the fourth map, was released. Later, Dragon Valley was released on 10 August 2011. Besides new maps, Easy Studios added various game elements such as motion blur due to the new, modified Refractor game engine.

On 25 October 2011, "Tier 3" training was released to include an array of new skill options for all four classes. On 1 December 2011, weapon customization was added to Battlefield Play4Free, thus allowing players to specifically customize their weapons with attachments such as holographic sights, different barrels, assorted stocks, and different types of magazines. Nineteen days later, on 20 December 2011, Easy Studios released the sixth map, Dalian, which was remade from Battlefield 2. Also, in the same update, Easy Studios replaced all "Legacy" weapons with reclassified weapons, which are denoted as "+3." On 23 October 2012, Easy Studios Released "Rush" game mode. This mode places players in one of two roles: either an attack or defense. The game plays out across multiple stages where destroyable MCOM stations are the focal point. There are two MCOMs at each stage, labeled A and B, both of which must be destroyed in order for the attackers to continue forward. The game ends when either all of the MCOMs are destroyed or the attackers are eliminated by means of depletion of their tickets. This game mode was first used in Battlefield: Bad Company. The expanded Sharqi Peninsula map was the first map to get the rush treatment. Karkand rush and Dalian rush were also added.

== Reception ==
Reception

Aggregate score
| Aggregator | Score |
|---|---|
| Metacritic | 68/100 (11 reviews) |

Review scores
| Publication | Score |
|---|---|
| IGN | 6/10 |
| PALGN | 5/10 |

The game received a score of 68/100 from 11 reviews on Metacritic. The game received an "Okay" score of 6/10 on IGN.

== Closure ==
On 15 April 2015, Easy Studios announced that on 14 July 2015 they would be closing Battlefield Play4Free and turning off services for the game. Battlefield Heroes, Need for Speed: World, and FIFA World were due to be closed on the same day.
