= Battlefield Heroes =

2009 video game

- Developers: DICE; Easy Studios
- Publisher: Electronic Arts: EU: Aeria Games
- Series: Battlefield
- Engine: Refractor 2
- Platform: Windows
- Release: June 25, 2009
- Genre: Third-person shooter
- Mode: Multiplayer

Battlefield Heroes was a 2009 third-person shooter game initially developed by DICE, further developed by Easy Studios, and published by Electronic Arts for Windows. It is the seventh installment in the Battlefield series, Battlefield Heroes was designed to be less demanding on computer specifications than the previous games in the series. This change was made to increase the player base, as well as to match players of similar skill levels together for fairer play.

Heroes was the first Battlefield game to be made under Electronic Arts' "Play 4 Free" model, which saw the game released for free with revenue generated from advertising and micropayments. Advertisements appeared on the website and in game screens, although no ads appeared while playing. Micropayments could be made for additional items to customize the appearance of a player's avatar or to buy stronger weapons. Play 4 Free Funds (formerly known as Battlefunds) were purchasable in-game via real-world money and used for acquiring rate boosts to experience points and other items.

Battlefield Heroes received mixed to positive reviews and went offline on 14 July 2015, alongside other EA free-to-play titles Battlefield Play4Free, Need for Speed: World, and FIFA World.

== Gameplay ==
Battlefield Heroes featured classic Battlefield-gameplay with a variety of classes and vehicles.

Battlefield Heroes featured a modified conquest mode providing each team 50 lives and eventually one flag at the start of the round. Killing enemies and holding more flags than the opposing army would progressively reduce their number of lives. There was also a mode called "Conquest V2." The goal of this mode was to take hold of a rocket for 5 minutes.

Additionally, the game featured matchmaking to keep players of the same level together. Developers of the game had talked about levels going as high as 40 or 50, although the level limit never rose higher than 30.

Like previous Battlefield games, Battlefield Heroes had a class system, featuring three basic classes. The Soldier (a mid-speed, mid-health, mid-ranged, medic), Gunner (a heavy, high-health, slow damage-dealer), and Commando (a low-health, speedy, high-damage specialist). Each class had its own advantages and disadvantages. Players could also purchase bandages to regenerate health and wrenches to regenerate vehicle armor health.

There were several vehicles in the game, all patterned after real vehicles of the Second World War. Included were two "light tanks", in the style of the M4 Sherman and the Panzer III/IV. Wheeled Vehicles in the game were patterned after the Kubelwagen and the Willys Jeep. Additionally, there were four aircraft, two of which were also made to look like the Messerschmitt Bf 109 and the Supermarine Spitfire, and the others were types of helicopters. In addition to the vehicle's driver, all Battlefield Heroes vehicles had passenger slots, allowing multiple players to be in the same vehicle at the same time.

Players could be awarded achievements by a mission system which allowed missions to be completed to get Valor Points, which could be redeemed for in-game merchandise.

== Development ==
A screenshot showing early gameplay shown in the official trailer

On 6 May 2008, the first phase of the game release was an invitation-only closed beta, and the invitations were given to professional beta testers only. Following the selection of beta testers, the amount of traffic caused the site to crash for a short time. Once the website was returned to service, it was revealed that third-party professional testers would be testing the game, and several open beta phases would begin afterward. The purpose of these beta phases were to test server capacity as players downloaded the game and whether the servers provided could handle the intense use. The closed beta players were under a non-disclosure agreement, disallowing them from releasing information about the beta. On 29 August 2008, hundreds of beta keys were given out on small cards at the EA booth at the Penny Arcade Expo to attendees The closed beta ended on 14 November 2008.

DICE stated in a post that they would be handing out extra closed-beta keys for the first 20 comments on their new posts. This was posted on the official Battlefield Heroes website on 31 July 2008. It was revealed that the first of these posts would be made on 4 August 2008. This caused so many users to attempt to access the Battlefield Heroes website at the same time that it caused the Battlefield Heroes server to crash, delaying the release of the keys until maintenance could be completed. Two days later, on 6 August, the method was changed so that users had to solve a riddle to win a beta key (although the first 20 comments were still awarded beta keys on this occasion since it was not made clear that the format had changed).

On 9 August, the second beta-key riddle was released (being harder, this riddle was available for a longer 5 minutes). Users were told that the riddle would be released at 7 pm, however, there was a degree of confusion over which time zone DICE meant. Being based in Sweden, DICE used the GMT +1 hour time zone, which was clarified later with the third riddle.

On 27 August 2008, DICE released another set of keys; this time, 400 were given out. Another 200 were released on 11 September 2008; these were claimed in 22 minutes.

On 29 July 2008, it was announced that Battlefield Heroes would be delayed until some time in the first 4 months of 2009. John Riccitiello, then CEO of EA, stated that the company was going "to increase its focus on some of the social networking features."

In January 2009, the Battlefield Heroes Beta Key Signup page was opened with another set of Battlefield Heroes keys on a "first come, first served" basis. The closed beta had already started, and users had to queue for a beta key. On 6 February, it was announced that the Battlefield Heroes Closed Beta Sign-Up had reached over 100,000 participants. On 10 February 2009, it was announced that the closed beta would be re-opened on 11 February 2009. Many fans incorrectly assumed that thousands of beta keys would be handed out on that day, however, only testers from the first phase were able to access the beta on that day. On 16 February 2009, 2000 beta keys were given out to some of the fans who had signed up for the previous stage on QABoss, and an additional 2000 were distributed the next day. On 24 February, it was announced that the QABoss beta keys were all handed out and had moved on to those who signed up on the site. Some fans seem to be having problems: there were still those who had signed up on QABoss and did not receive a key. DICE said that either they signed up too late or it was just a simple mistake. On 2 April 2009, DICE sent out 50,000 new beta keys to people who registered for the beta. On 25 June 2009, Battlefield Heroes was moved to open beta allowing anyone who missed out on a beta key to play the game.

=== Pricing model ===
While Battlefield Heroes still followed the free to play business model, changes in late 2009 altered the balance between free and paying users. On 30 November 2009, Electronic Arts altered the price structure in the game's online store, raising the cost of most items bought via free-to-acquire 'Valor Points'. At the same time, EA lowered the price of the majority of items available to buy with Play 4 Free Funds (formerly Battlefunds), an in-game currency that was purchased with real money. Ars Technica wrote about the update,

"...this update has a very real chance of ending the game. Now EA has forced gamers to make a choice between three options: quit, start playing for hours a day, or get out their wallets."

However, following the update, official Electronics Arts representatives claimed that the negative impact to the audience size was minimal.

The referral scheme was introduced on 14 April 2010. By referring friends on Facebook or via a web-link, the referrer and referred would gain 1350 Valor Points and an extra one-day XP Boost. If the referred player bought 2800 or more Play 4 Free Funds within 60 days, the referrer gained 700 Play 4 Free Funds, and the referred player gained another 1000 Valor Points.

The history of Battlefield Heroes' changes to the model of selling gameplay advantages was discussed in extensive detail by the former General Manager of Easy Studios, Ben Cousins, in a presentation entitled, "Paying to Win? Battlefield Heroes, virtual goods, and selling gameplay advantages".

=== Security breach ===
On 26 June 2011, hacker group LulzSec announced that they were able to hack into Battlefield Heroes and steal screen names and MD5-hashed passwords of over 550,000 beta users. According to staff, no emails, account history, credit card numbers, and other payment methods were compromised. As a result of this security breach, Battlefield Heroes was taken offline pending further investigation. Play services were resumed, and Battlefield Heroes website went back online after being down for one day after the breach. No personal or financial data was compromised; only screen names and encrypted passwords were taken by the hackers, and all accounts were restored and required to change passwords.

== Closure and fan restoration ==
On April 15, 2015, Easy Studios announced that on 14 July 2015, they would be closing Battlefield Heroes and turning off services for the game. Battlefield Play4Free, Need for Speed: World and FIFA World were closed on the same day. The decision was not reversed, and the game ended on the anticipated date. However, as of 2025, the game is still available to play as a fan restoration.

An unofficial spiritual successor to the game titled Heroes of Valor began development in 2025.

== Reception ==
Reception

Aggregate score
Aggregator	Score
Metacritic	69/100

Review scores
Publication	Score
1Up.com	A−
Eurogamer	6/10
IGN	8/10
PC Gamer (UK)	65/100

On 8 March 2011, EA announced that the game had reached seven million registered users. On 12 January 2012, the site announced that it had reached 10 million registered users.

On Metacritic, the game received a Metascore of 69, along with a user score of 6.1

IGN rated Battlefield Heroes at an 8 out of 10, saying that the game was "a lively and dynamic version of the series stripped down to the undeniably appealing essentials." but criticising the games lack of variety
