= FIFA World =

- Title screen for version 8 of the game, featuring Radamel Falcao (Monaco), Lionel Messi (Barcelona) and Gareth Bale (Real Madrid)
- Developer: EA Canada
- Publisher: EA Sports
- Series: FIFA
- Engine: Impact (based on FIFA 12)
- Platform: Microsoft Windows
- Release: BRA/RUS: 12 November 2013; WW: 20 May 2014
- Genres: Sports, football simulation
- Modes: Single-player, multiplayer

FIFA World was a free-to-play massively multiplayer online football game developed by EA Canada. It was announced on 9 August 2013 and later an open beta was released on 12 November 2013 in Brazil and Russia. The open beta was made available globally on 20 May 2014, with support in English, German, French, Russian, Spanish, Mexican Spanish, Brazilian Portuguese, Polish and Turkish. Italian was included with the release of version 9.0 of the game on 5 November 2014. Players could play the game using their keyboard, a combination of their keyboard and mouse or a game controller.

Like with the main releases of FIFA, Lionel Messi featured on promotional images and the title screen of the game. Arda Turan was announced as an ambassador for the game in Turkey on 27 August 2014, with Eden Hazard announced as another ambassador for the video game on 15 September 2014.

FIFA World, along with other EA free-to-play titles Battlefield Heroes, Battlefield Play4Free, and Need for Speed: World, went offline on 14 July 2015.

== Releases ==
After the release of the global open beta, EA Sports released version 6.0 of the game on 3 June 2014, with the game's interface redesigned to "bring the spirit and excitement of Brazil" in preparation for the 2014 FIFA World Cup. National teams were also included in the "Single Player Tournaments" mode of the game for the first time, while national team kits were also updated to reflect those to be used at the World Cup.

Video sharing was made possible on the game when version 7.0 was released on 22 August 2014. Players are able to select highlights at the end of a match and share them with their friends in-game, as well as on Facebook or YouTube.

On 1 October 2014, Electronic Arts released version 8.0 of the game, allowing players to make use of new items from the 2014–15 season in the Ultimate Team mode of the game, including new kits and updated player ratings from FIFA 15, while still allowing players to keep their old FIFA 14-style items from the 2013–14 season.

Released on 5 November 2014, version 9.0 saw the introduction of an improved version of the Impact engine from FIFA 12, first announced at Gamescom 2014. New features included 2,000 new animations added to the gameplay and tactical free kicks introduced in FIFA 13, as well as new skill moves and celebrations. Six new stadiums were also added to the game, including Aston Villa's Villa Park, Swansea City's Liberty Stadium and Schalke 04's Veltins-Arena.

== Game modes ==
=== League Teams ===
Screenshot of Chelsea playing against Barcelona on FIFA World

The League Teams mode of the game allowed the player to use any of the licensed clubs and national teams to progress through a promotion and relegation system within the game from Division 10 to Division 1. Every match played counted for one of five match credits allocated to each player. These match credits replenished over time after being used, and could also be purchased using "FIFA Points", the in-game currency of all FIFA titles.

The game featured the same leagues, clubs and national teams licensed for FIFA 15, although the Campeonato Brasileiro Série A and Brazilian clubs were removed from the game in September 2014 due to a failure to reach an agreement with the rights holders. The Turkish Süper Lig and all 18 Süper Lig clubs were also introduced to the game for the first time with the release of version 8.0 on 22 August 2014.

=== Ultimate Team ===
An example of a pack opened on FIFA World, including two Team of the Week or "in form" items

The Ultimate Team game mode allowed players to build unique squads within their club using players bought from the live transfer market or acquired in packs, which could be opened using coins earned in matches or "FIFA Points". Packs could also be earned by completing certain in-game accomplishments.

Players could use their squads in online seasons, where players competed against other players and progressed through a promotion and relegation system from Division 10 to Division 1, or in single-player seasons where players played against the game's licensed clubs controlled by the AI. Every week, a team compiled by EA Sports based on real-life player performances was released, where the players in these squads were represented as special black items with upgraded attributes. These were made available in packs for the rest of the week until a new "Team of the Week" is released.

Players could also customise their club's badges, kits, match balls and stadiums, extend their players' contracts, change their playing positions or temporarily improve their attributes using items acquired in packs or the live transfer market.

== Commentary ==
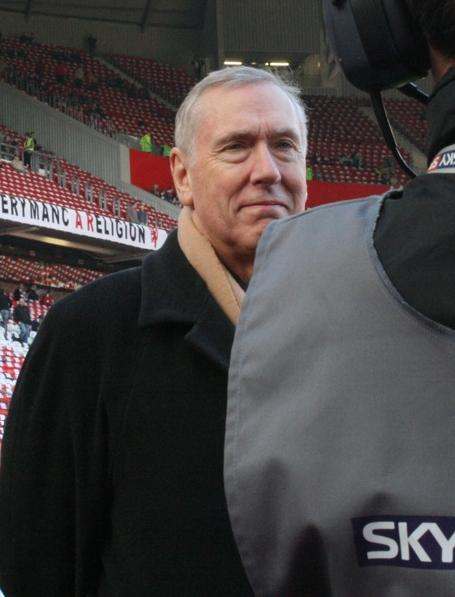
Martin Tyler was a commentator on the English-language version of the game.

The game adapted its commentary from FIFA 15, with commentators available in the 10 supported languages on the game.

- British English: Martin Tyler and Alan Smith
- Brazilian Portuguese: Tiago Leifert and Caio Ribeiro
- French: Hervé Mathoux and Franck Sauzée
- German: Frank Buschmann and Manni Breuckmann
- Italian: Pierluigi Pardo and Stefano Nava
- Polish: Dariusz Szpakowski and Włodzimierz Szaranowicz
- Russian: Yuri Rozanov and Vasiliy Soloviev
- Spanish: Manolo Lama and Paco González
- Mexican Spanish: Fernando Palomo, Mario Kempes and Ciro Procuna

== Closure ==
On 15 April 2015, EA announced they would be shutting down FIFA World servers on 14 July and turning off services for the game with immediate effect, after an open beta of nearly 18 months. A statement from a representative read: "We just didn't have the momentum to bring the game to a full commercial launch. It's a tough decision, but we believe ultimately the right one, that we stop development on the game." Battlefield Play4Free, Battlefield Heroes, and Need for Speed: World were also due to be closed on the same day. The decision was not reversed and the game was closed on the anticipated date.
