= Velan Studios =

American video game developer

Velan Studios, Inc.
- Type: Private
- Industry: Video games
- Founded: November 2016; 10 years ago
- Founders: Guha Bala; Karthik Bala
- Headquarters: Troy, New York, US
- Key people: Guha Bala (President); Karthik Bala (CEO); Kerry Coffey (CFO); David Nathanielsz (COO)
- Products: Mario Kart Live: Home Circuit; Knockout City; Star Fox
- Number of employees: 75 (2024)
- Website: velanstudios.com

Velan Studios is a video game developer headquartered in Troy, New York. Founded in 2016 by Guha Bala and Karthik Bala, the studio is most known for developing Mario Kart Live: Home Circuit (2020), Knockout City (2021), and Star Fox (2026).

== History ==
Velan Studios was founded in November 2016 by Guha Bala and Karthik Bala. The Bala brothers had previously founded Vicarious Visions in 1991 and left the company in April 2016. According to the founders, the studio aimed to develop "breakthrough experimental games", and the term "velan" stands for "spear bearer" in Tamil. In July 2017, the team successfully raised $7 million in venture capital for their first project. The studio's first game was Mario Kart Live: Home Circuit. The team completed the game's first prototype in 2017 and Nintendo greenlit the project after meeting the team in their headquarters in Kyoto. Home Circuit utilizes physical radio-controlled cars responding to how the player plays in-game, and Velan Studios was responsible for developing the software, while Nintendo focused on creating the hardware. The game received generally positive reviews when it was released in October 2020.

In March 2019, Electronic Arts announced that it had partnered with Velan Studios to release a "team-based action" game. The game was published under the EA Originals program, EA's initiative to support independent games. The program allowed the studio to retain full creative control while receiving most of the game's profit after development cost was recouped. The game, titled Knockout City, was released in May 2021. The game attracted 2 million players within its first week of release. However, in June of 2023, the game and servers were subsequently shut down due to low player retention.

In February 2023, Velan Studios announced Hot Wheels: Rift Rally, a mixed reality racing game based on the same technology that was used in Mario Kart Live: Home Circuit. The release was planned for March 14, 2023 but was later delayed to March 31.

During the UploadVR Summer 2024 Showcase, Velan Studios announced Bounce Arcade, a virtual reality pinball game for the Meta Quest, which was released on November 21, 2024.

On March 5, 2026, Velan Studios announced that it opened a new location in Toronto, Ontario, Canada.

== Games ==
Year	Title	Platform(s)	Publisher
2020	Mario Kart Live: Home Circuit	Nintendo Switch	Nintendo
2021	Knockout City	Windows, Nintendo Switch, PlayStation 4, PlayStation 5, Xbox One, Xbox Series X/S	Electronic Arts (2021–2022); Velan Studios (2022–2023)
2023	Hot Wheels: Rift Rally	iOS, PlayStation 4, PlayStation 5	Velan Studios
2024	Bounce Arcade	Meta Quest	Velan Studios
2025	Midnight Murder Club	Windows, PlayStation 5	Sony Interactive Entertainment
2026	Star Fox	Nintendo Switch 2	Nintendo
