= Need for Speed: World =

2010 massively multiplayer online racing video game

- Cover art featuring a Lamborghini Gallardo and a Nissan 370Z being chased by police
- Developers: EA Black Box / Quicklime Games (2010–2013); EA Singapore; Easy Studios (2013–2015)
- Publisher: Electronic Arts
- Composer: Mick Gordon
- Series: Need for Speed
- Platform: Microsoft Windows
- Release: WW: July 27, 2010; (Note: Users who pre-ordered a Starter Pack received early access on July 20, 2010.)
- Genre: Massively multiplayer online racing game
- Mode: Multiplayer

Need for Speed: World (previously known as Need for Speed: World Online) is a massively multiplayer online racing game published by Electronic Arts, and the fifteenth installment of the publisher's Need for Speed franchise. It was co-developed by EA Black Box (rebranded as Quicklime Games during the game's operation) and EA Singapore, with Easy Studios and EA Vancouver later taking over operations during its run. It was the first freemium game in the Need for Speed series and was available on Microsoft Windows. World was released worldwide on July 27, 2010. However, people who ordered a "Starter Pack" had an early "head-start" in the game, which started on July 20, 2010.

Need for Speed: World, along with other EA free-to-play titles Battlefield Heroes, Battlefield Play4Free, and FIFA World, went offline on July 14, 2015. However, fan preservation efforts resurrected the game as an unofficial freeware title; the first known fan-run servers went online in 2017.

== Gameplay ==
A screenshot of early gameplay, when the game was known as Need for Speed: World Online. World combines elements of role-playing with illegal street racing.

World has a similar gameplay style to 2005's Most Wanted and 2006's Carbon, focusing on illegal street racing, tuning, and police chases, and added some elements to the game such as "power-ups" (somewhat similar to Mario Kart). World was set in a fictional city which combined the cities of Rockport from Most Wanted and Palmont from Carbon into its map design, with redesigned graphics and new locations added to the map to connect the two cities. The game featured over 100 licensed cars consisting of multiple different variations of some. Manufactures ranged from Alfa Romeo to Volkswagen and there were over thirty manufacturers in the game.

Initially, after reaching a certain level, the player would not be able to progress further in the game and would cease to earn any more experience points or cash. To continue the game, the player had to purchase a "Starter Pack". Without it, the player was allowed to continue playing the game but would cease to earn experience and cash. On September 8, 2010, in celebration of the game reaching 1,000,000 registrations, the game was made completely free-to-play and the level cap was removed.

In the initial release of version 4 (July 20, 2010), car performance could be improved via street or pro upgrade kits (purchased with in-game cash), depending on the car. The game also had "driver skills", three of which directly improved performance (acceleration, handling, top speed) and applied to any car that a player was driving. The skills unlocked as a player leveled up and a player could select up to 49 of 81 possible skills. Once a skill was chosen, it couldn't be undone, and players would have to start with a new profile or account and level up again in order to choose a different set of skills. In a later update, the upgrade kits were removed and replaced by performance parts, each car having its own set of performance parts. Later, "driver skills" were removed from the game and replaced with skill mods, each car having its own set of skill mods, which consisted of things such as increasing the car's impact force or earning more money from a race. The lowest rated parts and skill mods could be directly purchased for free using in-game "cash", but higher rated parts and skill mods could only be won by chance from card packs, either free "lucky draw" card packs rewarded at the end of any event, or card packs purchased with real money converted into the games microtransaction currency called "speed boost".

Visual aftermarket parts were made available in an update released on March 16, 2011, and later added to lucky draw in another update in December 2011. All the in-game cash bodykits from previous versions were removed, however, most body kits required SpeedBoost to purchase. There were several choices of customization, some which were exclusive to specific cars. Along with body kits there were spoilers, wheels, neons, hoods, window tint and license plates. Most of these parts, like bodykits, had to be paid with by SpeedBoost. Players could also redeem gifts that they could equip to their cars.

== Development ==
The game was first announced to be free-to-play. In October 2009, World was opened to public beta-testing limited to residents of Taiwan. There have been seven closed beta sessions in total. Except the first one, all were available worldwide to residents who sign up, meet admission criteria, and get accepted.

The main part of the game's map was completed on October 26, 2010, when the final three areas (Downtown Rockport, Kempton, Fortuna) and the Turnpike bridge were added to the map.

Over time, the priority on game development transitioned into focusing on increasing revenue, so plans such as adding Carbon's canyons to the map, completion of the final link area, and addition of Need for Speed: Undercover's map to the game were dropped. Eventually, most of the development focused on adding more cars to the game since the cars helped increase revenue, and the game evolved into a "pay to win" game as the best cars could only be purchased with real money.

The EA Canada World team, later named Quicklime Games, which was in charge of game development, maintenance, and updates, was shut down on April 25, 2013.

On September 10, 2013, a Community Manager announced that Easy Studios (developers for Battlefield Play4Free) took over from what was left of the Quicklime Game team.

== Reception ==
Reception

Aggregate score
Aggregator	Score
Metacritic	62/100

Review scores
Publication	Score
1Up.com	C
Eurogamer	6/10
GamesRadar+	6/10
GameTrailers	5.6/10
IGN	6/10

Need for Speed: World received mixed reviews from critics according to review aggregator website Metacritic.

The highest praise of the game came from GamingXP, which commented that "The game feels like a combination of previous Need for Speed games except the single player has been cut off. Add some role-play elements and you have a racing MMO." PC Format gave a somewhat mediocre review in their October 2010 issue, concluding that the game "feels like a missed opportunity." Eurogamer commented that "It's a real shame that the MMO aspect of World is effectively a needlessly elaborate lobby." In November 2012, World surpassed twenty million registered users.

== Closure ==
On April 15, 2015, EA announced that on July 14, 2015, they would be closing Need for Speed: World and turning off services for the game, as the publisher felt "that the game no longer lives up to the high standard set by the Need for Speed franchise." The ability to purchase SpeedBoost and create new accounts were disabled since the announcement.

Following the game's closure, preservation efforts by fans to reverse engineer and make a playable version of the game led to a network of private servers under the title Soapbox Race World in 2017.
