= X-Squad =

2000 video game

- North American box art
- Developer: Electronic Arts Square
- Publishers: JP: Electronic Arts Square; NA/EU: Electronic Arts (Note: Under the EA Games label)
- Director: Takashi Kuroki
- Producers: Ray Nakazato; Stephen Murray
- Composer: Masanao Akahori
- Platform: PlayStation 2
- Release: JP: August 3, 2000; NA: October 26, 2000; EU: December 8, 2000
- Genre: Third-person shooter
- Mode: Single-player

X-Squad, known in Japan as X-Fire/Crossfire (XFIRE ~クロスファイア~, XFIRE ~Kurosufaia~), is a 2000 third-person shooter video game developed and published by Electronic Arts Square under the EA Games label for the PlayStation 2. It was released on August 3, 2000 in Japan, October 26 in North America (as a launch title for the console), and on December 8 in Europe.

== Gameplay ==
The player is prompted to use commands for Ash to give to his teammates.

X-Squad takes the form of a third-person shooter, with the two analog sticks moving the character and camera respectively. In the game the player leads a group of up to three soldiers through nine levels, giving them commands to perform helpful actions. The player can also use the R1 and L1 buttons to strafe.

== Plot ==
In the year 2037, W-Squad has been defeated. Doctor Bianca Noble has been kidnapped and her experiment Project Medusa has been stolen. Ash, the leader of X-Squad, along with teammates Maya, Melinda and Judd, is deployed to rescue Dr. Noble and take down her kidnappers.

=== Japanese version ===
The Japanese version of the game's story starts in 2036 where the government is forced to quarantine certain areas in the US. Two months later, government officials and a medical team were sent to the quarantined areas to investigate. Ash and his team were assigned to conduct a special forces op to figure out what happened to them.

== Development ==
EA partnered with Animation Science Corp. for developing the game's 3D animation. An early preview reported the game used 30 fps with a huge amount of motion capture sequences.

The game was formerly known as X-Shooter prior to being known as X-Fire. X-Squad was first shown in Japan in 1999 during the TGS convention. EA showcased the game during the 2000 E3 convention.

According to an interview with Mike Jeffress of Electronic Arts, the changes made for the non-Japanese version include English voiceovers, AI improvement, and changes to the story's plot to suit North American audiences. He mentioned that plans were considered to add multiplayer, but it was later discarded due to time constraints and feedback that most players didn't want to fight each other in the game.

== Reception ==
Reception

Aggregate score
| Aggregator | Score |
|---|---|
| Metacritic | 64/100 |

Review scores
| Publication | Score |
|---|---|
| AllGame | 2.5/5 |
| CNET Gamecenter | 6/10 |
| Edge | 6/10 |
| Electronic Gaming Monthly | 6.67/10 (Note: Three critics of Electronic Gaming Monthly gave the game each a score of 6.5/10, 7.5/10, and 6/10.) |
| EP Daily | 7.5/10 |
| Famitsu | 30/40 |
| Game Informer | 7.5/10 |
| GameFan | (J.W.) 80% 75% (Note: In GameFan's viewpoint of the game, three critics gave it each a score of 65, 82, and 77.) |
| GameRevolution | C− |
| GameSpot | 5.3/10 |
| IGN | 6.8/10 |
| Next Generation | 2/5 |
| Official U.S. PlayStation Magazine | 3.5/5 |
| Maxim | 8/10 |

The game received "mixed" reviews according to the review aggregation website Metacritic. Randy Nelson of NextGen called it "A concept game that unfortunately doesn't even get its concept right." In Japan, Famitsu gave it a score of 30 out of 40.

In one review, Human Tornado of GamePro called it "a great game for the action gamer who longs for a little more to chew on. The graphics are fast and nimble, and the action can be very challenging especially on the higher difficulty level. Even though it doesn't push the envelope, X Squad is a unique and very entertaining ride." (Note: GamePro gave the game two 3.5/5 scores for graphics and sound, 4.5/5 for control, and 4/5 for fun factor in one review.) In another GamePro review, Jake the Snake said, "If you can't get enough of third-person shooters, X Squad gives you plenty of trigger time, but nothing especially innovative or new." (Note: GamePro gave the game two 4/5 scores for graphics and control, and two 3.5/5 scores for sound and fun factor in another review.)
