= SurroRTG =

Remote gaming platform, 2018–2022

Surrogate.tv
- Industry: remote gaming
- Founded: 2018
- Founder: Esko Vähämäki; Severi Tikkala; Shane Henrik Allen; Stanislav Dmitriev
- Defunct: October 8, 2022
- Fate: Bankrupted
- Headquarters: Espoo, Finland
- Website: www.surrogate.tv (defunct)

SurroRTG is a low-latency streaming technology developed by Surrogate.tv. The company was located in Espoo, Finland, was founded in 2018, and ceased operation in 2022.

The company raised $2M from four investors in its initial seed funding in July 2019. A further $2.5M was raised with the second funding round in December 2020.

== Technology ==
SurroRTG is a low-latency streaming technology, used for fast responsiveness to control inputs to create a series of games, and is primarily based on Web RTC. This software uses one or more Raspberry Pi's to control physical hardware, along with camera(s) or a capture card to send a video stream to players and viewers. In addition to Surrogate.tv first party games in Espoo, it was made available along with examples of types of games for third-parties to create games to play on the Surrogate.tv website and app.

The streamer captures, encodes and sends the video stream to the client device. It uses a C++ program based on Google's libwebrtc, using Linux video capture API Video for Linux 2 (V4L2). The quality of the output steam is dynamically adjusted based on the available bandwidth. The H.264 encoder is used which can support a 720p 30fps stream.

The client device uses a web application built using the React.js front-end library. This web client can send inputs from keyboard, mouse, or gamepad.

The controller which interfaces with physical items where the game is located uses Python-based software, and can use wireless technologies to interface with hardware or can interface with it directly. For multi-player games a selective forwarding unit is used, which sends the same stream to all players with the quality determined by the lowest bandwidth to the client devices.

A detailed study of the system found mean latency to vary between 120ms and 225ms depending on the setup used. It noted that this could likely be improved using faster CODECs such as H.265 or by improving the jitter buffer as this buffer was optimized for the typical use of WebRTC for video conferencing rather than for remote control.

== Games ==
Race Real Cars circuit

=== Real Race Cars ===
The first game released in August 2019 was Real Race Cars, using 1:43 scale cars. This used image recognition to track the cars, and included leaderboards of race times.

=== Pinball ===
The second game released was a Stern Batman '66 pinball machine. The same technology was later used for further pinball machines, including Oktoberfest.

=== Sumobots Battle Royale ===
Sumobots arena

Sumobots Battle Royale launched in December 2019, the third game released by Surrogate, after Real Race Cars, and Batman '66. It was inspired by Robot Wars and BattleBots to allow players to remotely control battling robots. Each robot was themed on a partnership with six esport teams: Alliance, Excel Esports, Team Heretics, ENCE, Team Empire, and mousesports.

The robots are based on JSumo sumobots, but modified with a 3D-printed shell, electronics, and other components. The top of each robot has a servo-motor controlled self-righting mechanism.

Two cameras are located above the octagonal arena which track the symbol on top of each sumobot, and are used to identify when a robot has been eliminated.

The game takes place with six sumobots in an octagonal arena which has sixteen sections which drop as the game progresses, and a central section which doesn't drop. The objective for players is to remain on the raised sections until all other sumobots have been eliminated. Viewers could vote on the order the panels would drop. The number of wins using each robot was counted.

=== Mario Kart Live: Home Circuit ===
An unofficial remote play version of Mario Kart Live: Home Circuit was released in October 2020. This allowed four players at a time to race, with each player seeing the feed with the augmented reality (AR) overlay for the kart they were driving. The game uses a custom designed track, including numerous Mario and Nintendo items. It was available to play in various blocks of time during the week, due to the requirement of needing a host to help run the game. The game used three sets of four karts to enable continuous operation; each kart could last between 60 and 90 minutes, with charging taking up to three hours. Fifteen Nintendo Switches were required to run the game.

=== Other games ===
As an April fool project, toilet paper claw machine ran on April 1, 2020 partly in response to the toilet paper shortages near the beginning of the Covid-19 epidemic. The game ran until 1,000 rolls had been given away.

As part of the promotion for the November 2020 video game Assassin's Creed Valhalla, a non-public game racing Viking ships against Hafþór Björnsson was created.

In December 2020, the first in a series of "we play" games running on a Nintendo Switch was Pokémon Sword. Players queued, with each getting 60 seconds at a time to collaboratively play the game. Pokémon Brilliant Diamond was also released as a "we play" game.

Prize Bot used Rokenbok components, balls, and vehicles to create a game where players had to attempt to drop and manoeuvre the "prize" into a depot to win.
