= Mario Kart Live: Home Circuit =

2020 video game

- Developer: Velan Studios
- Publisher: Nintendo
- Director: Dan Doptis
- Producers: Yosuke Tamori; Hiroshi Matsunaga; Toyokazu Nonaka
- Programmer: Jan-Erik Steel
- Composer: Ryo Nagamatsu
- Series: Mario Kart
- Engine: Viper
- Platform: Nintendo Switch
- Release: WW: October 16, 2020
- Genres: Kart racing, augmented reality
- Modes: Single-player, multiplayer

Mario Kart Live: Home Circuit is a 2020 mixed reality kart racing game developed by Velan Studios and published by Nintendo for the Nintendo Switch. Players control toy radio-controlled cars which race around the player's home, streaming video from the onboard camera in the karts into the video game. It received favorable reviews and sold 1.73 million units worldwide as of December 31, 2022.

== Gameplay ==
Players build racing playsets around the house. The radio controlled cars are equipped with video cameras, controlled via the Nintendo Switch. The track has many traditional Mario Kart items. The game supports up to 4 players, either human or AI. The Grand Prix mode has the player race against Bowser Jr. and the Koopalings, and unlocks new customization options and costumes for the playable characters. The level creation in Home Circuit is performed by placing guidance arrows along four gates to make checkpoints which advance the player through the five-lap race.

== Development ==
Velan Studios developed the mixed reality prototype for Home Circuit, and demonstrated it to Nintendo staff, who were "thrilled" with "its potential". The game was primarily developed by Velan Studios, in collaboration with Nintendo EPD's Production Group No. 4, Nintendo European Research & Development and Nintendo PTD.

Home Circuit was revealed in a Nintendo Direct on September 3, 2020, to celebrate the Super Mario franchise's 35th anniversary, where it was scheduled for release on October 16, 2020. A toy set featuring Mario and another set featuring Luigi, including their respective drivers, four gates, arrow signs, and a charging cable, were also announced shortly after the Direct, and pre-orders became available shortly after.

Velan Studios stated that the controls were designed to be easy to understand, while remaining faithful to the Mario Kart series.

In October 2020 Surrogate.tv created an unofficial remote play version using fifteen Nintendo Switches and three sets of four karts, with the game physically located at a custom track in Finland.

== Reception ==
Reception

Aggregate scores
Aggregator	Score
Metacritic	75/100
OpenCritic	44% recommended

Review scores
Publication	Score
4Players	77/100
Game Informer	7.5/10
GameSpot	7/10
IGN	7/10
Jeuxvideo.com	16/20
Nintendo Life	8/10
Polygon	Recommends

The game received "generally favorable" reviews, according to review aggregator website Metacritic. 44% of critics recommended the game, with a top critic average of 74/100, according to OpenCritic. Within its first week of release in Japan, 73,918 copies were sold, making it the best-selling retail game of the week in the country. It was nominated for the category of Best Family Game at The Game Awards 2020. During the 24th Annual D.I.C.E. Awards, the Academy of Interactive Arts & Sciences awarded Mario Kart Live with "Racing Game of the Year", along with nominations for "Immersive Reality Technical Achievement" and "Outstanding Technical Achievement".

As of December 2022, Mario Kart Live: Home Circuit has sold 1.73 million units.
