= Unravel Two =

2018 video game

- Developer: Coldwood Interactive
- Publisher: Electronic Arts
- Director: Martin Sahlin
- Composers: Frida Johansson; Henrik Oja
- Engine: PhyreEngine
- Platforms: PlayStation 4, Windows, Xbox One, Nintendo Switch
- Release: PS4, Windows, Xbox One; June 9, 2018; Nintendo Switch; March 22, 2019
- Genre: Puzzle-platform
- Modes: Single-player, multiplayer

Unravel Two is a 2018 puzzle-platform game developed by Swedish company Coldwood Interactive and published by Electronic Arts. The game is centered around two 'Yarnys', small anthropomorphic creatures made of yarn. It is the sequel to the 2016 game Unravel, and was released for PlayStation 4, Windows, and Xbox One in June 2018 and Nintendo Switch in March 2019.

== Gameplay ==
While Unravel was only single-player, Unravel Two is both a single-player and a multiplayer game, however only in local co-op. The game focuses on two Yarnys (which can be controlled by one or two players) which must work together in order to solve puzzles and manipulate the world. The game's main storyline is set on an island, and it includes additional, more difficult challenge levels.

== Plot ==
A red Yarny is separated from his home and his owner in a storm at sea, and is washed ashore with his yarn being cut to a dead end. He encounters a blue Yarny among the shipwreck and the two connect their dead ends together, forming a bond. A spark emerges from the connection and the continuous objective of the game is to chase it. The two Yarnys explore the forest and the underground before emerging to ground level and taking residence in an abandoned lighthouse - the game's loading hub.

The Yarnys enter the corridor of an adoption home where a child is attempting to escape abusive adults, and the Yarnys help her by using the spark to chase the adults off. A boy knocks on the child's bedroom window, and she escapes with him through the rooftop. The Yarnys follow the children through a small park, and the adults take the form of dark shadows with red sparks that disintegrate the Yarnys on touch.

The Yarnys emerge in a sunny countryside setting in the midst of midsummer celebration, but as the children are mistreated by the intoxicated adults, the setting turns dark and threatening. The Yarnys run from the shadows and, along with the children, hide from the adults. They are chased through the forest by a capercaillie, narrowly escaping. As the children play and go swimming in the forest, the Yarnys explore the woods and are chased through a lake by a northern pike.

By nighttime, adults search for the children with flashlights and hounds in an old factory. One child is caught and locked up, but later escapes when the Yarnys cause a machine to malfunction, causing a mayhem distracting the adults, and the children are reunited. The Yarnys help the children hide by chasing the adults off with the spark, and finally break out of the factory. A truckload of wooden logs crashes onto an electrical fence, starting a forest fire that spreads to the buildings and stables. The boy rescues the other child from the fire when he is stuck in branches by a stream. The Yarnys struggle their way through, and the children are seen rescuing the stable horses from the fire before themselves running into safety.

Initially, the Yarnys go through the ruins of the forest ravaged by wildfire, and go through an abandoned watermill, gradually making it active again, and they follow the water to the nearby rapids in a sunny setting. The children are seen pushing an adult into the current. In the final cutscene, the lighthouse is surrounded by dark spirits, but the spark chases them away and a group of Yarnys of various shapes and colors appear. Together they bring the spark to the center of the lighthouse and its light is restored, and the storm outside passes over.

== Development ==
In May 2016, EA announced the developers of Unravel, Coldwood Interactive, had signed a publishing deal for their next game. This game was later confirmed to be Unravel Two. On June 9, 2018, at their 2018 E3 press conference, EA announced Unravel Two would be released that same day.

According to the game's producer, Michael Gill, Unravel Two was not released on the Nintendo Switch as "it would have taken another half a year or so." On February 13, 2019, Nintendo announced that the game would arrive on the Nintendo Switch through its Nintendo Direct presentation.

== Reception ==
According to review aggregator website Metacritic, the game received "generally positive reviews" upon release.

At the 22nd Annual D.I.C.E. Awards, Unravel Two won the award for Family Game of the Year.
