= Yuri Rozanov =

Russian sports commentator (1961–2021)

- Юрий Розанов
- Born: Yuri Albertovich Rozanov; 12 June 1961; Zagorsk, Moscow Oblast, Russian SFSR
- Died: 3 March 2021 (aged 59); Moscow, Russian Federation
- Occupation: Sports TV commentator

Yuri Albertovich Rozanov (Russian: Ю́рий Альбе́ртович Ро́занов; 12 June 1961 – 3 March 2021) was a Russian sports TV commentator, mainly working on broadcasts of football and ice hockey matches. Together with Sergey Crabu, they were awarded the TEFI in the category of sports commentator/sports program presenter in 2012.

== Biography ==
Rozanov studied at the secondary school No. 1 in Vidnoye, Moscow Oblast. He also studied at the Moscow Power Engineering Institute, at the Faculty of Electronic Engineering, but did not graduate.

Rozanov started his career on the channel NTV Plus. He was head of the editorial board.

On 1 September 2012, Rozanov became a commentator on Ukrainian channels. He left Ukraine in April 2014 due to the political situation in the country.

Between November 2015 and his death, Rozanov was a commentator of football and hockey broadcasts on Match TV.

Rozanov was married and had one daughter.

He died on 3 March 2021 from cancer. He is buried at Mitinskoe Cemetery.
