= Mario Kart DS =

2005 video game

- North American box art
- Developer: Nintendo EAD
- Publisher: Nintendo
- Directors: Makoto Wada; Yasuyuki Oyagi
- Producer: Hideki Konno
- Designers: Shinya Hiratake; Taku Matoba
- Programmer: Katsuhisa Sato
- Artist: Yoshiki Haruhana
- Composer: Shinobu Tanaka
- Series: Mario Kart
- Platform: Nintendo DS
- Release: NA: November 14, 2005; AU: November 17, 2005; PAL: November 25, 2005; JP: December 8, 2005
- Genre: Kart racing
- Modes: Single-player, multiplayer

Mario Kart DS (Note: Mario Kart DS (マリオカートDS, Mario Kāto Dī Esu)) is a 2005 kart racing game developed and published by Nintendo for the Nintendo DS. Like other games in the Mario Kart series, Mario Kart DS features characters from the Mario series and pits them against each other as they race in karts on tracks based on locations from the Mario series. It was released in November 2005 in North America, Europe, and Australia, and in December 2005 in Japan, and re-released for the Wii U's Virtual Console in North America and PAL regions in April 2015 and in Japan in May 2016. The game is the fifth main entry in the Mario Kart series, the second for a handheld console, and the first playable via the Nintendo Wi-Fi Connection online service.

Mario Kart DS was acclaimed for its refined gameplay, robust single-player content, and innovative multiplayer features, particularly its pioneering online Wi-Fi functionality. Reviewers highlighted its blend of accessibility, depth, and nostalgic appeal, though some noted limitations in the online mode and frustration with the rubberband AI. The game received several awards, including Editors' Choice Awards from GameSpot and IGN, G-Phoria's Best Handheld Game award, and IGN's Best Racing/Driving Game. Mario Kart DS was the best-selling game in its first two months. It is the third-bestselling Nintendo DS game as of March 2016, behind New Super Mario Bros. and Nintendogs, and the third-bestselling Mario Kart game, behind Mario Kart 8 Deluxe and Mario Kart Wii, with 23.6 million copies sold worldwide.

== Gameplay ==
Mario racing on Figure-8 Circuit, the introductory track. The top screen shows item boxes that are in front of him, and the bottom screen shows a bird's-eye view of the immediate vicinity.

Mario Kart DS is a racing game in which the player, as a Mario franchise character, races in a kart against seven other characters. Each course features item boxes that the player can drive through to receive a randomly selected item. Some items allow the player to attack other racers to slow them down, while other items can be used to speed up their own kart to pass other racers more easily.

The game features a base roster of the eight playable characters from Mario Kart 64 and Mario Kart: Super Circuit, along with four unlockable characters Daisy, Dry Bones, Waluigi, and R.O.B. for a total of 12. Each character has three unique karts to choose from, each of which vary in attributes such as top speed, acceleration, and handling.

The game features five single-player game modes: Grand Prix, Time Trial, Versus, Battle, and Mission. The Grand Prix and Versus modes require the player to choose an engine class from among 50cc, 100cc, and 150cc. The classes serve as difficulty levels—the higher the engine class, the faster all karts go. In addition, a mirror mode can be unlocked, in which karts use 150cc engines and tracks are horizontally flipped. The game features 32 courses across eight cups, half of which contain new tracks (known as Nitro Grand Prix), and half of which contain tracks from previous Mario Kart games, such as Baby Park from Mario Kart: Double Dash (known as Retro Grand Prix).

The game also features a multiplayer mode, in which eight players race each other using the DS Download Play feature for consoles without a cartridge or a multi-card wireless LAN connection. This version has limited courses available, and players with no cartridges play as Shy Guy, a character unavailable in normal play.

Until its discontinuation on May 20, 2014, Mario Kart DS supported online play via the Nintendo Wi-Fi Connection, in which up to 4 players could play together.

== Development and release ==
Nintendo announced on May 11, 2004, that they planned to release a Mario Kart game for the Nintendo DS, releasing some gameplay video footage at the same time. The company offered the game for the public to play for the first time at the 2005 Game Developers Conference, where the game's wireless feature was also showcased. Mario Kart DS was produced by Hideki Konno. The game runs at a consistent 60 frames per second and uses full 3D characters and environments.

Mario Kart DS is the first Mario Kart iteration to support online play. Konno remarked that although both Mario Kart DS and the Halo series feature online play, he noted that most of the people who use the feature in Halo games were "hardcore gamers". With Mario Kart DS, Konno wanted "everyone to go online, and the technology and time is right for that to happen". As the Mario Kart game for the Nintendo DS, the developers tested several features that took advantage of the device's bottom touchscreen. They considered letting players place items anywhere on the track instead of just behind their kart. However, the developers found it too confusing because the game already had too many distractions, making it difficult to control where to place items while racing.

In an interview, Konno noted that tracks from previous Mario Kart games were included in Mario Kart DS so that players who played the original Super Mario Kart on the Super Nintendo Entertainment System would feel more familiar with the DS iteration of the series.

Mario Kart DS was released by Nintendo for the Nintendo DS in North America on November 14, 2005, in Australia on November 17, 2005, in Europe in November 2005, and in Japan on December 8, 2005. Nintendo later revealed that Mario Kart DS would also be sold bundled with a new red-colored Nintendo DS starting on November 28, 2005, along with "a checkered-flag wrist strap, and racing-inspired decals to customize new red handheld".

Mario Kart DS was re-released for the Wii U's Virtual Console in North America and PAL regions in April 2015, and in Japan in May 2016.

== Reception ==
=== Critical response ===
Reception

Aggregate score
| Aggregator | Score |
|---|---|
| Metacritic | 91/100 |

Review scores
| Publication | Score |
|---|---|
| 1Up.com | 8.9/10 |
| Computer and Video Games | 9/10 |
| Electronic Gaming Monthly | 26/30 |
| EP Daily | 9/10 |
| Eurogamer | 9/10 |
| Game Informer | 8.5/10 |
| GamePro | 4.5/5 |
| GameRevolution | A− |
| GameSpot | 9.2/10 |
| GameSpy | 5/5 |
| GameZone | 9.5/10 |
| IGN | 9.5/10 |
| Nintendo Power | 9/10 |
| Nintendo World Report | 10/10 |
| PALGN | 9/10 |
| X-Play | 5/5 |

Mario Kart DS received "universal acclaim" from critics, according to the review aggregation website Metacritic, where its 91/100 rating is the third-highest for any Nintendo DS title. It was often called the best entry in the Mario Kart series, with Craig Harris of IGN declaring it the best kart racing game ever.

The gameplay was lauded for its precision, accessibility, and depth, blending classic Mario Kart mechanics with refined additions. Reviewers appreciated the return to the series' roots, with tight controls, power-sliding, drafting, and turbo boosts adding strategic layers. Bryn Williams of GameSpy praised the "pixel-perfect" controls and the balance of racing skill and power-up strategy. Mike Sklens of Nintendo World Report noted the removal of Mario Kart: Double Dash's "gimmicky" features, making the game more focused and intense. Shane Satterfield of Xplay highlighted the learning curve for D-pad power-slides but found them satisfying. Harris emphasized the tight, responsive mechanics, combining the best elements from past titles. Tom Bramwell of Eurogamer and Chris Shepperd of Nintendo Power noted frustrations with the rubberband AI, with blue shells and catch-up mechanics causing unfair losses.

The single-player experience was considered robust, with a deep Grand Prix mode, innovative Missions mode, and varied Time Trial and Battle modes. The inclusion of 16 new tracks and 16 retro tracks from previous Mario Kart games was said to add significant replay value and nostalgia. Justin Calvert of GameSpot and Louis Bedigian of GameZone highlighted the 32 tracks (split evenly between new and retro), with standout new courses like Waluigi Pinball and Airship Fortress. Matt Wales of Computer and Video Games called the new tracks "tightly-focused, inventive, and downright fun". Bramwell and Electric Playground's David Chapman praised the Missions mode as a fresh addition. However, Greg Ford of Electronic Gaming Monthly (EGM) found the missions forgettable, and Brendan of PALGN noted the 150cc difficulty could have been tougher.

The multiplayer, especially local Wi-Fi for up to eight players, was positively highlighted and described as offering chaotic, fun racing and battle modes. The single-cart multiplayer option was appreciated for accessibility, though limited in tracks and characters. Williams described local eight-player matches as "pure gaming nirvana". Chapman and GamePro's Rice Burner praised the single-cart mode's inclusivity. Calvert and Sklens commended the battle modes for adding strategy and chaos.

The online mode, a first for Nintendo, was regarded as a groundbreaking addition but limited by simplistic matchmaking, lack of communication, and restricted track selection. Despite these flaws, it was praised for smooth performance and accessibility. Williams noted the ease of connecting but criticized the lack of a lobby system and four-player limit. Satterfield and 1Up.com's Jeremy Parish lamented the cumbersome friend code system and inability to add opponents post-race. Chapman and Game Informer's Matt Helgeson appreciated the simplicity but wished for more features like online Battle mode. Shepperd found the four-player limit sparse compared to local play.

The 16 new tracks were deemed among the series' best, with designs like Waluigi Pinball, Airship Fortress, and Tick-Tock Clock being praised for their creativity. The retro tracks, while evoking nostalgia, had a more mixed reception. Shane Bettenhausen of EGM ranked the new tracks among the best ever, while Bedigian noted the retro tracks' 3D upgrades but called the Game Boy Advance tracks visually lacking. Bramwell praised the new tracks' adrenaline-charged design and the retro tracks' polished remakes, though Bettenhausen found the retro selection uneven.

The mix of classic power-ups and new additions was considered well-balanced, adding strategic depth without unbalancing the game. Calvert and Williams highlighted the Blooper and Bullet Bill for their strategic impact. Ben Silverman of GameRevolution noted the lack of new defensive items but found the arsenal effective. Wales appreciated the Blooper's novelty and the slipstream mechanic's tactical value.

The graphics and audio received mixed responses. Shepperd praised the near-Nintendo 64 quality visuals, while Satterfield noted the blocky, plain aesthetics compared to PlayStation Portable games. Bedigian criticized the sound quality and overabundant effects, but Brendan loved the atmospheric track music and character catchphrases.

By the end of the game's debut week in the United States, 112,000 people purchased it, of which 52,000 had logged onto Nintendo Wi-Fi Connection to play against other people over the Internet. Mario Kart DS received Editors' Choice awards from IGN and GameSpot. The game was nominated by GameSpot for several Best of 2005 awards, including Best Multiplayer Game, Best Driving Game, and Best DS Game, winning the lattermost. The game received G-Phoria's Best Handheld Game award. IGN gave the game the awards for Best Racing/Driving Game. During the 9th Annual Interactive Achievement Awards, the Academy of Interactive Arts & Sciences nominated Mario Kart DS in the categories of "Racing Game of the Year" and "Outstanding Achievement in Online Gameplay". GamesRadar named Mario Kart DS the best DS game of all time, beating out Pokémon Black and White (2nd) and Grand Theft Auto: Chinatown Wars (3rd).

=== Sales ===
Mario Kart DS was the best-selling handheld game in its debut month of November 2005 in the United States. It was the 10th best-selling game of 2008, and the best-selling Nintendo DS game of that year. In Japan, the game sold 224,411 copies in its first week. Mario Kart DS sold 3,112,363 units as of July 2008, and 3,224,996 copies as of January 2009, making it the sixth best-selling game for the Nintendo DS since the console's release. In the United States, it sold 910,000 copies and earned $31 million by August 2006. During the period between January 2000 and August 2006, it was the 23rd highest-selling game launched for the Game Boy Advance, Nintendo DS, or PlayStation Portable in that country. In 2009, Official Nintendo Magazine ranked the game 26th on a list of greatest Nintendo games. As of March 2016, Mario Kart DS has sold 23.6 million units worldwide.
