= Brawl in the Family =

Brawl in the Family may refer to:

- "Brawl in the Family" (The Simpsons), an episode from The Simpsons
- Brawl in the Family, a gag-a-day webcomic by Matthew Taranto
- "Brawl in the Family", an episode from The Loud House
