= Coconut Mall =

Fictional race track in Mario Kart

- Mario Kart location
- Coconut Mall as shown in Mario Kart Wii
- First appearance: Mario Kart Wii (2008)
- Last appearance: Mario Kart Tour (2022)
- Created by: Nintendo
- Genre: Kart racing

In-universe information
- Type: Kart circuit / shopping mall
- Location: Isle Delfino

Coconut Mall (Note: Japanese: ココナッツモール, Hepburn: Kokonattsu Mōru) is a race track that made its first appearance in the 2008 video game Mario Kart Wii, an entry in the Mario Kart series of kart racing games. The course takes place inside of a shopping mall on Isle Delfino, a location from the game Super Mario Sunshine. The track has made appearances in the subsequent games Mario Kart 7, Mario Kart 8 (as a part of the Booster Course Pass DLC), and Mario Kart Tour.

Upon the addition of the track to Mario Kart 8 in 2022 as a part of the DLC, players criticized it for replacing the moving Mii obstacles near the end of the track with stationary Shy Guy enemies; Nintendo later responded by making the enemies perform donuts. The course's theme music has also been popular online, going viral in 2020.

== Concept and design ==
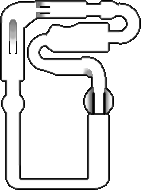
The mini-map of the course as shown in Mario Kart Wii

Coconut Mall takes place inside of a tropical-themed shopping mall on Isle Delfino, the same location where Super Mario Sunshine is set. It contains various escalators which either speed up or slow down the player. The boost depends on the direction the escalator is traveling, which alternates every lap. After the first escalator, the player can choose to either go left to travel on speed pads or go through the Delfino Dream shop, which functions as a shortcut. The shop shortcut is intended for players who already have speed boosts from previous items, as the shop's carpet slows down players that do not have it. Afterwards, players choose whether to drop into the lower courtyard or keep going on the walkway. On the course's lower level, in the main mall, there is a fountain that, when hit, launches the player in the air, allowing them to reach more power-ups. There is also a metal stairway on the upper level later in the track that leads to additional power-ups. Near the end of the lap, there is a split path, with one side leading to the roof and the other around the side of the building. At the end of the course, there is a section of three speed pads, although Mii NPCs driving back and forth act as obstacles that temporarily stun the player if hit. In Mario Kart Wii, there are three cars, but the number was decreased to two in Mario Kart 7. It was also changed in that game to have the cars run the full width of the track instead of only certain areas.

== Appearances ==
Coconut Mall made its debut in the 2008 installment Mario Kart Wii as a part of the Flower Cup, which contained three other tracks. It also made an appearance in 2011's Mario Kart 7. In March 2022, it was made available in Mario Kart 8 as a part of the first wave of the Booster Course Pass DLC. The track was added to Mario Kart Tour in May 2022, as a part of the "Doctor Tour".

== Reception ==
The course has been placed near the top in all-time rankings of Mario Kart courses; it reached the top ten in Prima Games 2014 ranking and The A.V. Club's 2017 ranking. The track was also ranked eleventh on the 2017 "The 50 Greatest Mario Kart Courses, Ranked" list by Thrillist's Joshua Khan.

There was largely negative reception to the track's inclusion in the Booster Course Pass of Mario Kart 8, mainly stemming from the low quality of it and other tracks from the Pass' visuals compared to those of the base game. After the February 2022 Nintendo Direct that first announced the inclusion of Coconut Mall and revealed its appearance, viewers criticized the cartoony, less-realistic design of the environment with its solid colors and lack of texture that was more akin to that of Mario Kart Tour than 8. A month later, Nintendo of America tweeted an updated version of the track, which contained more vibrant colors and reflections on the windows. Upon the release of the tracks in March, players criticized the removal of the car-driving Miis, which were replaced with static Shy Guys on the edge of the track. The removal led to even more criticism when Coconut Mall was added to Tour in May; despite it sharing more similarities with the version in 8 than Wii, the cars were capable again of moving back and forth on the track. Nintendo responded to it in August with the release of the second wave of DLC, changing the Shy Guys so that they will randomly perform donuts. In the Booster Course Pass, the escalators throughout the course were also replaced by steep, out-of-character ramps, which led to the fanbase having also spoken out.

The course's theme has been popularly received; in October 2020, it debuted at number fifteen on the US Spotify Viral 50 chart after going viral as background music on TikTok. In 2021, the music became a meme in a vein similar to that of Rickrolling, where online links cause people to unintentionally hear the music once clicked. In 2024, the use of the theme in an edit with Kamala Harris' words "You think you just fell out of a coconut tree?" led to increased interest online.
