= Ice Hockey (1988 video game) =

1988 video game

- North American NES box art
- Developers: Nintendo R&D4; Pax Softnica
- Publisher: Nintendo
- Director: Hideki Konno
- Producers: Masayuki Uemura; Shigeru Miyamoto
- Programmers: Narumi Nakajima; Hiroaki Hontani
- Composer: Soyo Oka
- Platforms: Famicom Disk System, NES
- Release: Famicom Disk System: JP: January 21, 1988; NES: NA: March 1988; PAL: April 15, 1988
- Genre: Sports (ice hockey)
- Modes: Single-player, multiplayer

Ice Hockey (Note: Japanese: アイスホッケー, Hepburn: Aisu Hokkē) is a 1988 ice hockey video game developed by Nintendo and Pax Softnica and published by Nintendo for the Famicom Disk System and Nintendo Entertainment System. Ice Hockey is based on the sport of the same name, with the objective of the game being to get more points than the opposing player by hitting round, black pucks into the opposing goal with a hockey stick.

Ice Hockey received positive reviews from critics, and has been often cited as one of the best games for the NES. It was re-released for the Wii's Virtual Console service in 2006, as well as the Nintendo Classics service for the Nintendo Switch in September 2018.

== Gameplay ==
The play and mechanics of Ice Hockey are mostly similar to that of its namesake sport. The objective for both teams is to hit a black puck with a hockey stick into the opponent's goal. Teams are made up of five players including the goaltender, as opposed to six in real life. Players wear ice skates, which are used to skate across the icy rink. Each game is made up of three periods, with the victory going to the team who has the most points at the end of the game. At the beginning, two opposing players from each team face off in the middle of the rink. The player selects from three kinds of hockey player: the first is fast, weak, and feeble, but is good at the face-off; the second is average in all qualities, and the third is slow and poor at the face-off, but very powerful, both in body checking and shooting strength. The arena is similarly designed to a real-world ice hockey arena. The rink is coated in ice, with a goal on either side of the arena. There are a variety of marked areas, including the goal line that the puck must cross to score, the attacking/defending zone which is situated closely to each goal, the face-off spot, the neutral spot, and others. Each side of the rink has exactly the same design. If two opposing players fight for the puck for a certain amount of time, other players join the fight, resulting in the player from the losing team in the fight being put in the penalty box for a period of time.

== Development ==
Ice Hockey was developed by Nintendo R&D4, with Hideki Konno as director, Masayuki Uemura and Shigeru Miyamoto as producer and Soyo Oka as composer. Narumi Nakajima and Hiroaki Hontani of Pax Softnica assisted on programming. Hontani had previously directed Volleyball for Nintendo, a remake of his previous game Attack Four; this is his last project with Nintendo before his departure from Pax Softnica.

== Reception and legacy ==
Ice Hockey was rated the 142nd best game made on a Nintendo System in Nintendo Power's Top 200 Games list. Electronic Gaming Monthly listed it as number 94 on their list of the 100 best console video games of all time, remarking that it "has some of the most hilarious gameplay of any sports game ever, yet it still requires a lot of skill to play and accurately represents the excitement of real hockey. Fights turn into brawls, close games raise the crowd noise up when the game clock reaches two minutes, and the available team members vary in ability, making for (gasp!) strategic play." It was also included in IGN's list of the top 100 NES games, ranking at 100. Mark Bozon of IGN praised it for being the most addictive of Nintendo's early sports titles, commenting that it was in his NES as often as Super Mario Bros. 3 was. Aaron Thomas of GameSpot also commended the Virtual Console re-release for being "one of those rare NES sports games that's almost as much fun to play today as it was when it was released."

Hideki Konno, the designer of the game, later went on to direct and produce Nintendo titles such as Super Mario Kart, Super Mario World 2: Yoshi's Island, and Luigi's Mansion.
