= Tadpole Treble =

2016 video game

- Developer: BitFinity
- Publishers: BitFinity; Sunken Treasure Games
- Director: Matthew Taranto
- Designers: Matthew Taranto; Michael Taranto
- Composer: Matthew Taranto
- Engine: Unity
- Platforms: Microsoft Windows, OS X, Linux, Nintendo Switch, Wii U
- Release: Windows, OS X, Linux: WW: September 2, 2016; Wii U: WW: August 11, 2016; Nintendo Switch: WW: January 21, 2021
- Genres: Action, adventure, rhythm game
- Mode: Single-player

Tadpole Treble is a rhythm game developed by BitFinity. The game was funded through a Kickstarter campaign and was released on Steam for Linux, Microsoft Windows and OS X on September 2, 2016 and for the Wii U on August 11, 2016. A port of the game was released for the Nintendo Switch as Tadpole Treble Encore on January 21, 2021, which features slight changes and new content.

The player controls a newly hatched tadpole and must navigate throughout levels resembling sheet music staves. The art and music of the game was created by Matthew Taranto, the writer and artist of webcomic Brawl in the Family.

== Gameplay ==
Each stage of Tadpole Treble takes place on a sheet music staff, where the player can alternate between the horizontal lines to avoid obstacles and score points. The player moves at a constant pace throughout the level and has the ability to interact with stage elements using a "kick" which can increase the total score when timed well. Players can also use a level editor to make their own levels which can be shared with other players using QR codes. This feature was removed from the Switch version of the game.

== Reception ==
Reception

Aggregate score
Aggregator	Score
Metacritic	NS: 82/100; PC: 90/100; WIIU: 85/100

Review scores
Publication	Score
Destructoid	8/10
Nintendo Life	9/10

Tadpole Treble received mostly positive reviews from critics. On review aggregator Metacritic, Tadpole Treble received a score of 82/100 for the Nintendo Switch release, 90/100 for the PC release, and 85/100 for the Wii U release. Critics praised the game's art style, simplicity and soundtrack.

Kevin McClusky of Destructoid rated the game 8/10, writing that, despite some bugs, "[Tadpole Treble] a simple game, but it does exactly what it sets out to do and it has a cute, clean aesthetic that serves it well." Writing for Nintendo Life following the release of Tadpole Treble Encore, Mitch Vogel criticized the relatively short length of the game and the removal of the level sharing feature, but praised the "cosy and friendly atmosphere" of the game.
