= Waluigi =

Video game character

- Mario character
- Promotional art by Shigehisa Nakaue (2017)
- First game: Mario Tennis (2000)
- Created by: Fumihide Aoki
- Voiced by: Charles Martinet (2000–2022); Kevin Afghani (2024–present)

Waluigi (English: /ˌwɑːluˈiːdʒi, ˌwɒl-/ WAH-loo-EE-jee, WOL-oo-; Japanese: ワルイージ, romanized: Waruīji) is a character in the Mario franchise. He plays the role of Luigi's arch-rival and accompanies Wario in spin-offs from the main Mario series, often for the sake of causing mischief. He was created by Camelot employee Fumihide Aoki and was voiced from 2000 to 2022 by Charles Martinet, who described Waluigi as someone with a lot of self-pity. Waluigi's design is characterised by his tall stature, thin and lanky frame, and his purple and blue outfit with a purple hat, which displays an inverted yellow "L".

He was designed as Wario's tennis partner and sidekick, debuting in the 2000 Nintendo 64 game Mario Tennis. He has featured in over 50 video games, appearing in at least one game every year since his debut until 2022. He is a playable character in Mario sports games, most Mario Party games, and also in the Mario Kart series. He has also made cameo appearances in other video games, such as the Super Smash Bros. series.

Since his debut, Waluigi has received a polarised reception from the media, often being accused of having few defining characteristics and minimal backstory. He has attained a cult following, especially helped through his use as an Internet meme. Although he has never appeared in his own video game or any mainline Mario game, critics have described him as one of Nintendo's mascots and a cult hero.

== Concept and creation ==
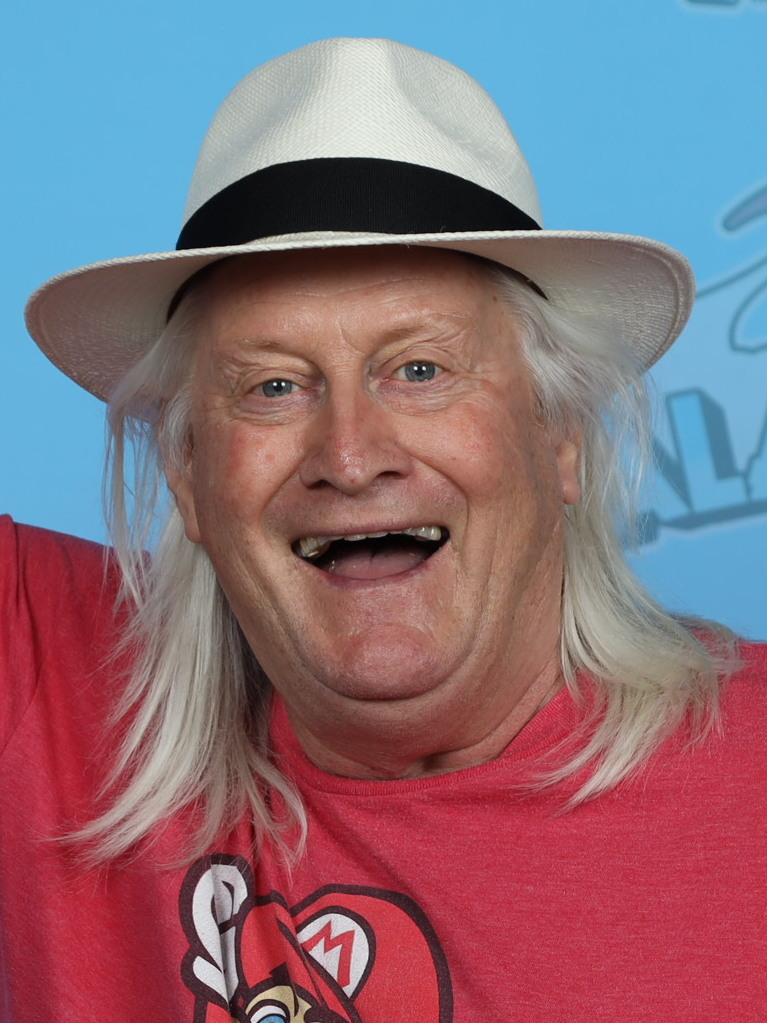
Charles Martinet voiced Waluigi from his debut in 2000 to 2022.

Waluigi was created during the development of the game Mario Tennis to serve as the bitter rival to Luigi. He was originally introduced as Wario's younger brother in the American version of the game. His character design was created by Fumihide Aoki. His name is a portmanteau of Luigi's name and the Japanese adjective warui (悪い), meaning "bad"; hence, a "bad Luigi".

Waluigi was conceived as a sidekick for Wario to team up with in the doubles matches of Mario Tennis. In an interview with Nintendo Dream, Shugo Takahashi said that he initially asked Nintendo to create a new character but was told to develop a character at Camelot. The character's name was agreed upon from the beginning before his design was finalised. Initially, the idea was to change one letter to make him similar to Wario, but Takahashi said that as a bad version of Luigi, he was named Waluigi. An early idea for the symbol on Waluigi's hat was a W, but as this was the same as Wario, it was changed to the letters W and L. Yōichi Kotabe, who supervised the character at Nintendo, decided that this should be an upside-down L as an inversion of Luigi, just as the W in Wario is an upside-down M for Mario. Waluigi's appearance was designed to be lean to create a balanced team combination with the stoutness of Wario. Camelot took inspiration from Boyacky and Tonzura from the Doronbo Gang in the Yatterman series. His purple colouring was chosen to create a balance of colours alongside those of the other characters in the game, and his moustache was created in the shape of the letter L. Takahashi said that Waluigi was characterised as the rival of Luigi, with them having a similar relationship to Mario and Wario.

Upon his debut in Mario Tennis, Waluigi was voiced by Charles Martinet, who continued to voice the character until stepping back from recording character voices in 2023 to take on a new role as Mario Ambassador at Nintendo.

Waluigi's appearance in Super Mario Strikers gained attention for a celebratory taunt that became known as the "crotch chop". The taunt involves the character thrusting his hips forward while gesturing towards his crotch. Despite looking like the letter V, Waluigi's chop using both hands was supposed to represent the W in his name. The game's director, Mike Inglehart, said that the development team at Next Level Games wanted to make Waluigi "a bit edgier than Wario" and explore his character. He thought that Waluigi's character was about blaming others, whereas Wario was about self-loathing. Inglehart said that when it was presented to Nintendo, "nobody batted an eye", so he was surprised that the taunt was allowed to remain in the game without question.

== Characteristics ==
The Greek symbol "Γ" (upside-down L) on Waluigi's hat and gloves is used to represent him in many games.

Waluigi is portrayed as a mischievous villain and an exaggerated mirror version of Luigi. He bears a large pink nose and crooked moustache. His stature is tall, and his frame is thin and lanky. He is the rival of Luigi and is the same age. His Super Smash Bros. Melee trophy describes him as hardworking by stating that he spends his time training and perfecting his skills in order to antagonise the Mario brothers. Although he has a scrawny physique, Waluigi is technically skilled and athletic but sometimes cheats in-game. His design comprises black overalls, a purple long-sleeved shirt, and a purple hat with a yellow "Γ" symbol (an inverted L, paralleling Wario's W as an upside-down M).

Martinet stated that the cornerstone of Waluigi's personality is one of self-pity, a character who feels that everything goes right for everyone but himself. Waluigi was created to be the tennis partner of Wario in Mario Tennis, and early material from Nintendo of Europe portrayed them as brothers, but their relationship has since been ambiguous. When asked whether Waluigi was a brother to Wario in 2008, Martinet stated that while he did not know, he felt that they were just "two nice, evil guys who found each other".

Despite having appeared in more than 50 video games, Waluigi has been provided with little backstory and has few defining traits other than the need to be liked, an appreciation of Princess Daisy, and his habit of screaming out his signature catchphrase, "Waaah!" In various Mario sports games, Waluigi can perform exaggerated athletic moves. In Mario Power Tennis, when making an offensive power shot, he demonstrates his spinning ability and poses in the shape of his "Γ" symbol. In Mario Party 8, his preferred victory stance involves producing a rose as a recurring accessory. As displayed in Mario Power Tennis and Mario Hoops 3-on-3, Waluigi has the ability to summon a body of water and swim towards the ball, which IGN editor Rob Burman described as "baffling".

== Appearances ==
=== Mario spin-off games ===
From his debut in 2000, Waluigi appeared in at least one game every year until 2022. This 22-year streak ended in 2023, which was the first year that Waluigi did not appear in any game. He is the only regular character in the Mario franchise to never appear in his own game or be given a role in the mainline Mario series. His first appearance was in the Nintendo 64 and Game Boy Color versions of Mario Tennis, establishing himself as Wario's doubles partner. He remained partners with Wario for future installments, the one exception being Mario Tennis: Power Tour, where he appeared in-game without Wario. Mario Power Tennis begins with Wario and Waluigi losing a tennis tournament and plotting their revenge on Mario and Luigi by teaming up with Bowser, who helps them to train up for the doubles final. In Mario Tennis Aces, Waluigi is a defensive character that can cover a wide area. He and Wario initiate the story events by offering Mario a racket called Lucien that possesses Luigi and threatens to destroy the kingdom. During gameplay, he can perform a trick shot in which he moonwalks. He also performs a special shot that involves spinning around while flaunting a rose.

Alongside Princess Daisy, Waluigi joined the Mario Party series starting with Mario Party 3. The game features his own board filled with traps named Waluigi's Island. After Mario Party 3, he returned as a playable character in every subsequent game in the Mario Party series except Mario Party Advance. He next appeared as one of the playable characters in Mario Party 4. In Mario Party-e, one of the multiplayer duels is named Waluigi's Reign.

In the Mario Golf series, Waluigi features as a playable character alongside other main Mario characters in Mario Golf: Toadstool Tour, where he has his own unique play style. Waluigi and Wario are presented as the villains in the game's introduction until they get into trouble by angering Bowser. In 2014, he returned as a playable character in Mario Golf: World Tour. In the 2021 golf game Mario Golf: Super Rush, his Special Shot is his Slim Stinger, which blasts balls out of its path. He also performs a Dance-off Dash, in which he pirouettes and leaps.

Waluigi appears in the Mario Strikers series beginning with Super Mario Strikers. He is one of nine Mario characters that can be chosen as team captains. He returns in Mario Strikers Charged and is introduced in the game's introduction, where Mario, Bowser, and other major characters battle for the ball on a soccer field. He appears as a playable character in Mario Strikers: Battle League, where he is a defensive character and can perform a powerful kick that sends the ball towards the goal, leaving a trail of thorns.

Waluigi is a playable driver in the Mario Kart series, first appearing in Mario Kart: Double Dash!!, where his course is known as Waluigi Stadium. He features in all subsequent console installments with the exception of Mario Kart 7. In Mario Kart DS, Waluigi has his own course named Waluigi Pinball, which later returned as a DLC booster course in Mario Kart 8 Deluxe. He is a recurring character in Mario Kart Tour, where he also appears as a bus driver. In October 2021, for a Halloween event, Mario Kart Tour introduced another variant of Waluigi dressed as a vampire wearing a top hat and cape and riding a Vampire Flyer kart.

Waluigi appears in Mario Superstar Baseball (2005) as one of the cast of characters featuring Mario and friends. He reprises his role as a playable character in Mario Super Sluggers. Waluigi plays a significant role as the main antagonist of Dance Dance Revolution: Mario Mix, in which he wreaks havoc in the Mushroom Kingdom by stealing the Music Keys to hypnotise the world with his dancing, requiring Mario and Luigi to retrieve them. He also appears as one of the player characters shooting hoops alongside Mario in Mario Hoops 3-on-3 (titled Mario Slam Basketball in Europe), where he performs a swimming ability. Waluigi is one of several playable characters appearing in the Mario & Sonic series, starting with the crossover sports game Mario & Sonic at the Olympic Games, which features Mario and Sonic the Hedgehog. He appears alongside other Mario characters in Mario Sports Mix, a sports game featuring hockey, volleyball, dodgeball, and basketball. He and other Mario characters appear in Mario Sports Superstars. A variant of Waluigi named Dr. Waluigi appeared as one of 45 doctor characters in the mobile game Dr. Mario World before the game was shut down. Waluigi appeared again in the 2026 game Mario Tennis Fever. Mario Tennis Fever also debuted Waluigi's baby form, Baby Waluigi.

=== Other video games ===
The logo of Waluigi's Foot Fault, a 2000 Nintendo browser game

Waluigi is the main character in an official Nintendo Adobe Flash browser video game titled Waluigi's Toenail Clipping Party a.k.a. Waluigi's Foot Fault. The game was released online in 2000 to promote the then-upcoming Mario Tennis game. The game tasks players with trimming Waluigi's toenails and catching the clippings in a jar. The game is no longer available and is considered to be lost. The video game was originally hosted at www.waluigi.com, which now redirects to the official Nintendo website. Fans and archivists have been unable to retrieve or restore the game, although a directory of files related to the game has been found.

In the Super Smash Bros. series, starting with Brawl, Waluigi appears as a non-playable Assist Trophy item. When Waluigi was revealed as an Assist Trophy but not a playable character for Super Smash Bros. for Nintendo 3DS and Wii U, game director Masahiro Sakurai jokingly stated that "just because you try hard doesn't mean you'll make it into the battle". He was again excluded as a playable character but instead used as an example for destroying Assist Trophies during the gameplay reveal of Super Smash Bros. Ultimate.

Waluigi makes minor appearances in other video games. In Game & Watch Gallery 4, he is an opponent of Luigi in the Boxing game. He appears in Super Mario Maker as an unlockable Mystery Mushroom costume for Mario to wear in the Super Mario Bros. style. Although he does not make an appearance in Paper Mario: The Thousand-Year Door, Mario can be dressed in the colours of Waluigi. In 2016, he was introduced alongside other core Mario characters to the Minecraft: Wii U Edition as a skin in the Super Mario Mash-Up Pack. In Super Mario Odyssey, an outfit modelled after Waluigi's own can be purchased in-game and worn by Mario after the player has collected enough Power Moons. A Rabbid version of Waluigi named Bwaluigi appears as a boss alongside Wario's Rabbid counterpart Bwario in Mario + Rabbids Kingdom Battle.

== Promotion and reception ==
Waluigi has appeared in official branded merchandise, such as plush dolls, clothing, and food packaging. His purple colour scheme and design have been used on official Nintendo Switch controllers. In April 2016, Nintendo released an amiibo of Waluigi as part of a set of seven Super Mario amiibo figures.

Since his appearance in Mario Tennis, Waluigi has received a mixed reception. Ben Bertoli of Kotaku said that the game introduced "one of gaming's greatest anti-heroes" and that Waluigi had since gained a cult following. IGN editor Matt Casamassina described him as a recognisable mascot to many, but also as a beloved one to Nintendo fans. Hiroyuki Takahashi, a developer for Mario Power Tennis, chose him and Wario as his favourite characters in Power Tennis, adding that he prefers characters with more personality. Ian Walker of Kotaku expressed a pure love for Waluigi on the character's 20th anniversary and highlighted that while Mario, Luigi, and Wario are all sympathetic characters, "Waluigi stands apart as the one truly irredeemable scoundrel" and considered that an aspect of his character is present in everyone. Ryan Craddock of Nintendo Life also celebrated the 20-year anniversary of his debut, stating that he could not imagine a Nintendo sports game without him. Writing for Game Informer, Dan Ryckert felt that Waluigi should be the star of his own game because he considered him to be funnier than Wario and highlighted that his legs look hilarious when running. Despite this, he opined that Nintendo did not care about the character because his relationship to Wario had never been clarified. While describing Waluigi as a "hollow absence of a character" and "a rejected Frankenstein monster, cobbled together from half-assed, bad, or otherwise meaningless ideas", Dom Nero of Esquire praised the character for his tennis skills and the fluidity of his movements. He opined that playing as Waluigi in Mario Tennis Aces epitomises the joy of playing video games and highlighted his moonwalking backswing, spins, and tossing of roses as "devilishly entertaining". VG247 writer Kelsey Raynor thought that the Waluigi Pinball track was the best in the Mario Kart series, stating that it was "Waluigi's time to shine" and was the perfect opportunity for a character associated with chaos to force drivers into a "sadistic death-trap of a race".

Pedro Hernandez, writing for Nintendo World Report, commented that Waluigi is a "very structurally basic character", as he is simply Wario transformed into Luigi with a purple and black colour scheme. He said that while Wario was given a personality and story, Waluigi was just an accessory to Wario whose purpose was to pad out the supporting characters. He also noted that gamers had developed a love/hate relationship with the character, as he had generated universal hatred while also gaining a cult following. Chris Buffa of GameDaily included him as one of the characters they wanted to kill, describing him as "one of the most unimportant characters in video game history". Brett Elston of GamesRadar+ described Waluigi as a "lame-o villain" in an otherwise great game, referencing Mario Tennis. Matthew Gault of Vice criticised Waluigi for having no defining characteristics other than hating Luigi and described him as a "corporate trash character that's lazy, dumb, and uninteresting". He noted that due to his lack of characterisation, fans had spent years creating their own backstories for him. Destructoid wrote that Waluigi's name and design amounted to "creative bankruptcy" and thought that the Internet had created him as a meme that was outside of the character that Nintendo depicted and then mistakenly treated it as canon. In Icons of Horror and the Supernatural: An Encyclopedia of Our Worst Nightmares, Volume 1, S. T. Joshi cites Waluigi and Wario as archetypal examples of alter egos.

Waluigi's reveal in Super Smash Bros. Ultimate as an assist trophy caused a lot of negative reactions.

His exclusion as a playable character in Super Smash Bros. Ultimate (confirmed when the character was announced as a non-playable Assist Trophy during E3 2018) was met with negative reception from the gaming press and social media, including a comedic Twitter post by Netflix. The response resulted in numerous Internet memes and a Change.org petition calling for the character to be added to the game. IGN's Joe Skrebels described his non-playable status within the game as "a slap in the face for those who want a playable Waluigi". Fan reaction to the omission intensified and resulted in series director Masahiro Sakurai being subjected to a harassment campaign on social media. Former Nintendo of America president Reggie Fils-Aimé acknowledged the popularity of Waluigi and dismissed the idea that Nintendo had purposefully excluded him due to disliking the character. Claire McNear of The Ringer described Waluigi as Nintendo's cult hero, but commented that his place in the Mario hierarchy of characters is tenuous and that, despite being a "pan-internet obsession", he is yet to appear in a mainline Mario game outside of spinoffs. Ian Walker of Kotaku highlighted that official artwork of the character promoting a blue-purple Switch colourway had gained considerable Internet attention due to his seductive pose and use of a rose as a romantic gesture. Briana Lawrence of The Mary Sue described Waluigi as "Nintendo's ultimate sex symbol" in reference to his official render and found him to be interesting due to the mysterious nature of his character. This positive reaction to Waluigi's animations was echoed by Zack Zwiezen for Kotaku, who upon reviewing a demo for Mario Strikers: Battle League noted that Waluigi's characteristic swagger and "rose pose" featured prominently in his scoring animation. Henry Stockdale, writing for TechRadar, praised the game's visuals, particularly describing Waluigi's Hyper Strike involving placing a rose in his mouth as "the stuff of many Nintendo fans' dreams". Zack Zwiezen also expressed disappointment over Waluigi not appearing in a single game in 2023 and thought the character had been forgotten by Nintendo and deserved his own game, particularly because Princess Peach appears in her own game.

Due to his popularity, Waluigi has been featured in popular culture in the form of memes, songs, and poems. Elijah Watson of The Daily Dot chronicled his influence as an internet meme from 2008, describing him as "beloved by a part of the web". In April 2009, he appeared in the webcomic Brawl in the Family, which was renamed "Waluigi in the Family" for April Fools' Day. He became a recurring character, resulting in the webcomic introducing the catchphrase "Too bad. Waluigi time." In a May 2021 episode of Saturday Night Live, host Elon Musk starred as Wario in a sketch in which he was put on trial for murdering Mario in a kart race, with Kate McKinnon dressed as Waluigi.
