= Mario Kart Wii =

2008 video game

- Box art depicting Luigi (left) and Mario (right) using the Wii Wheel peripheral
- Developer: Nintendo EAD Software Development Group No. 1
- Publisher: Nintendo
- Director: Yasuyuki Oyagi
- Producer: Hideki Konno
- Designers: Hirotake Ohtsubo; Yoshihisa Morimoto
- Programmers: Katsuhisa Sato; Yusuke Shiraiwa; Yukihiko Ito; Keiichiro Kato; Ichiro Suzuki
- Artist: Daisuke Kageyama
- Composers: Asuka Hayazaki; Ryō Nagamatsu
- Series: Mario Kart
- Platform: Wii
- Release: JP: April 10, 2008; EU: April 11, 2008; AU: April 24, 2008; NA: April 27, 2008
- Genre: Kart racing
- Modes: Single-player, multiplayer

Mario Kart Wii (Note: Japanese: マリオカートWii, Hepburn: Mario Kāto Wī) is a 2008 kart racing game developed and published by Nintendo for the Wii. It is the sixth installment in the Mario Kart series, and was released worldwide in April 2008. In Mario Kart Wii, the player takes control of one of 24 Mario series characters, who participate in races on 32 race tracks based on locations from the series while using specialized items to hinder their opponents or to gain advantages.

Mario Kart Wii features multiple single-player and multiplayer game modes including two- to four-person split screen. Online multiplayer was supported until the discontinuation of Nintendo Wi-Fi Connection in May 2014. Mario Kart Wii features a returning multiplayer mode: Battle Mode. The aim is to defeat the other players by attacking them with power-ups, destroying balloons that surround each kart. Mario Kart Wii uses the Wii Remote's motion-controls to provide intuitive and conventional steering controls. Each copy of the game was bundled with the Wii Wheel accessory to augment this feature and mimic a steering wheel.

Development of Mario Kart Wii began shortly after the release of 2005's Mario Kart DS. Hideki Konno, who originally served as producer of the previous two games of the Mario Kart series, returned to produce the title. In his Nintendo composer debut, Ryō Nagamatsu joined Asuka Hayazaki as Mario Kart Wii's main composers. Both used new interpretations of the familiar melodies from earlier games alongside original material to create Mario Kart Wii's soundtrack.

Mario Kart Wii was received positively by critics and general audiences. Praise focused on the online mode, characters, innovative gameplay, tracks, and karts, whereas criticism was directed at its item balancing and rubberband AI. It was a commercial success, selling more than 8.9 million copies in 2008 to become the best-selling game of the year. In total, Mario Kart Wii sold over 37 million copies, making it the second best-selling Mario Kart game after Mario Kart 8 Deluxe and one of the best-selling video games of all time.

== Gameplay ==
Yoshi, the player character, is seen drifting on a bike, a new vehicle type for the series, during a race on Mario Circuit. The heads up display indicates race information in the four corners of the screen (clockwise from top right): race time, laps, mini-map, race position, and collected power-up.

Mario Kart Wii is a kart and bike racing game featuring single-player and multiplayer modes. The players control one of many selectable Mario franchise characters and participate in races or battles using go-karts or motorbikes on courses thematically based on locations from the Mario franchise. During gameplay, the player views the action from a third-person perspective that tracks the player from behind their vehicle. Mario Kart Wii supports four different control schemes; the primary control scheme is the Wii Remote, optionally used in conjunction with the plastic Wii Wheel accessory, which uses the controller's motion-controls to simulate operating a steering wheel. The other supported control schemes are the Wii Remote with the Nunchuk attachment; the Classic Controller; and the GameCube controller, all of which allow the player to instead steer using the respective controllers' analog stick. While driving, the player collects power-ups from item boxes placed in various points on the track—these power-ups allow the player to attack opponents, causing them to slow down or spin out of control; defend against such attacks; or gain boosts in speed.

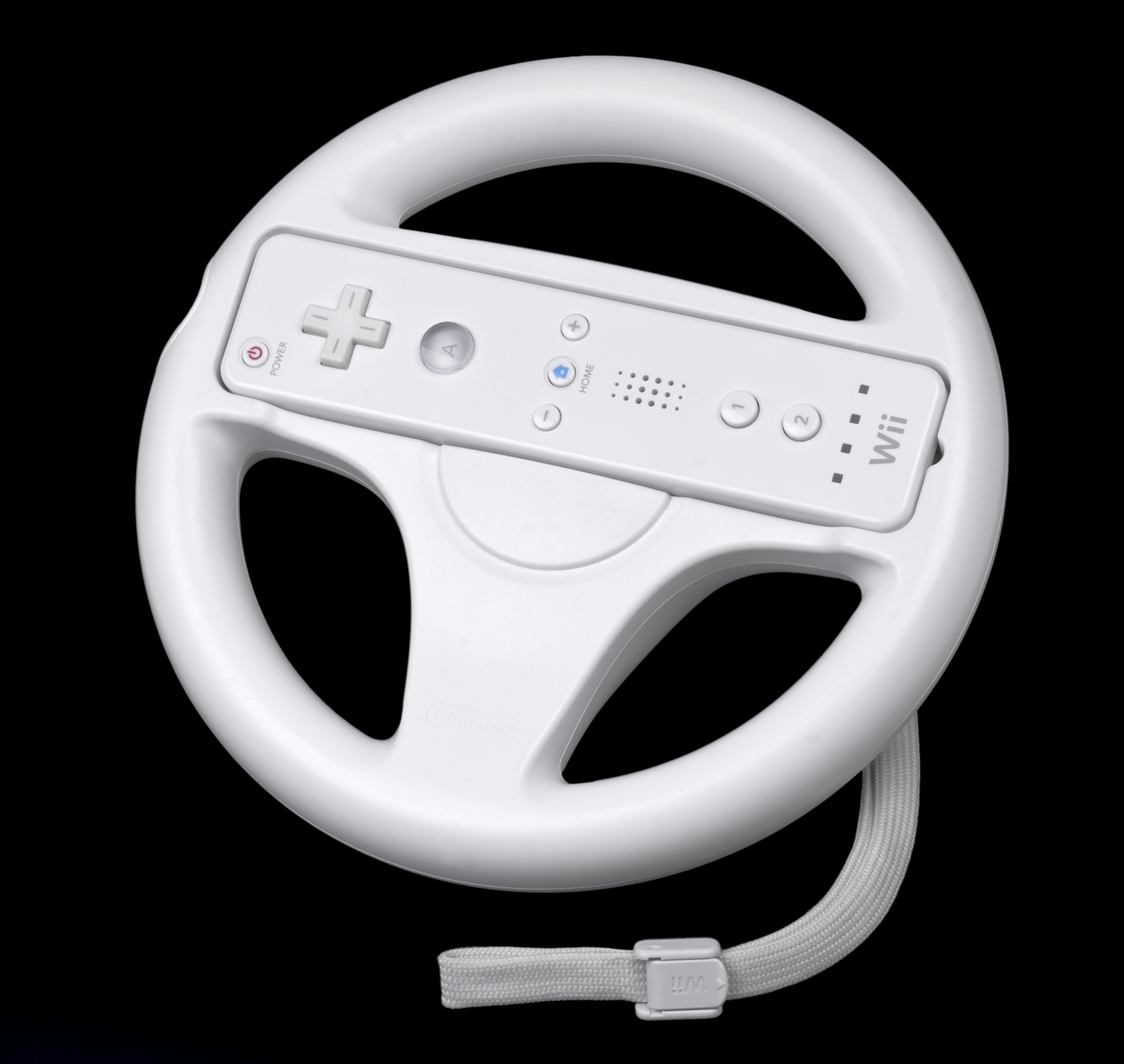
Mario Kart Wii is bundled with the Wii Wheel accessory.

Mario Kart Wii features 24 playable characters from the Mario series, the largest roster of any Mario Kart game until the release of Mario Kart 8 in 2014. Wii introduces Baby Peach, Baby Daisy, Rosalina, Funky Kong, and Dry Bowser as playable drivers for the first time in the Mario Kart series. Unlike Mario Kart DS, where characters can drive a kart exclusive to that character and the standard go-kart, each character is assigned to one of three different weight classes, which affects the selection of vehicles the character can drive. Mario Kart Wii uses two different classes of vehicles, Karts and Bikes, with the latter being a new addition to the series. Bikes were also subdivided further into two categories: regular and sports bikes, with sports bikes featuring an alternate drift type known as inside drifting. Mii characters saved in the console's Mii Channel are also playable. Thirty-six vehicles are available in Mario Kart Wii, each of which has different properties that affect how the vehicle handles while driving. Half the characters, vehicles, and courses are initially unavailable to the player; certain objectives must be completed to unlock each one.

The game features eight cups—sets of four different tracks—for a total of 32 unique tracks. Like its predecessor Mario Kart DS, Mario Kart Wii has 16 new courses and 16 courses from prior Mario Kart games.

Mario Kart Wii features multiple game modes: Grand Prix, Time Trials, Versus, and Battle. All modes support single-player gameplay; Versus and Battle support local multiplayer for up to four players, with or without computer-controlled players. In Grand Prix, the player participates in four three-lap races from one of eight cups against eleven opponents. The player is awarded points at the end of each race based on their ranking. The total number of points collected, among other factors, determines the player's overall rank. Versus mode is similar to Grand Prix, but the presented courses and items are configurable. In Time Trials, the player must quickly complete the race in the fastest time possible—there are no opponents or items except for three Mushrooms given at the start of each race. The player can compete against a ghost character, which mimics a player's movements from an earlier race.

Battle mode is similar to that seen in previous installments in which players drive around an enclosed arena and attack each other using items. The players are divided into two teams, red and blue, and teammates cannot harm each other with their items. There are two variants of Battle mode available: Balloon Battle and Coin Runners. In Balloon Battle, each player's kart has three attached balloons. A player gains a point each time they pop or steal a balloon belonging to an opposing team player but loses a point each time they lose all balloons. In Coin Runners, the players collect coins scattered throughout the arena and attack opposing team members to make them drop coins. The team that has accumulated the most points or coins total when the three-minute time limit expires wins. There are ten arena courses available for Battle mode, which include five original courses and five retro courses.

Online play via Nintendo Wi-Fi Connection was available until its discontinuation on May 20, 2014. Versus and Battle modes were available and supported up to 12 participants, and up to two players could connect and play from the same Wii console. Players could compete against random players from within the same region or from any continent, or could compete only against players registered as friends. At the end of each race or match, each player's VR (versus rating) or BR (battle rating) would change based on their final ranking. The Mario Kart Channel also offered additional online information, including regional or worldwide rankings for Time Trials, and monthly Nintendo-sponsored tournaments with special objectives.

== Development ==
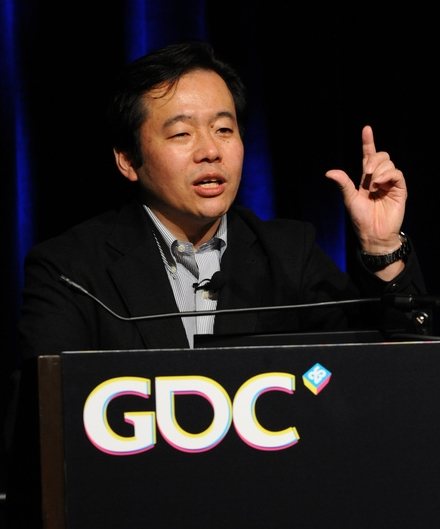
Hideki Konno (shown in 2011), who produced the previous two games of the series, returned as a producer.

Mario Kart Wii is the sixth game in the Mario Kart series, following Mario Kart DS. Hideki Konno, who worked with the Software Development Department of Nintendo's Entertainment Analysis & Development (EAD) division and had previously worked on the first two Mario Kart games as well as Mario Kart DS, served as the game's producer. Shigeru Miyamoto acted as "General Producer" and gave miscellaneous advice on various aspects of the game.

Features cut from Mario Kart DS due to time constraints were implemented in Mario Kart Wii alongside various improvements to online play. The developers also wanted to avoid online races becoming more deserted as they progressed, thus altering the online matchmaking to allow players to join a race once it is finished for participation in the next one. The game was the first in the series to feature motocross bikes as drivable vehicles, an idea which Konno had proposed since Double Dash out of his passion for extreme sports but was rejected due to the seemingly bizarre image of Mario riding a bike. The game was briefly known internally under the name "Mario Kart X" before its final name was decided upon, referring to the "X" in the word "extreme".

Mario Kart Wii was officially announced at E3 2007; the online features and the first footage of the game were shown at the Expo. During Nintendo of America CEO Reggie Fils-Aimé's presentation, he unveiled the game via a trailer that showed some of the new characters and tracks. The trailer also displayed that the game would include up to 12 simultaneous racers. Additional details of the game were later released in conjunction with the Nintendo Fall 2007 Conference held in October 2007, where it was revealed that it would include bikes and the Wii Wheel. New gameplay footage from the game was also shown, and the release date was revealed to be set for spring 2008. Mario Kart Wii was released on 10 April 2008 in Japan, 11 April in Europe, 24 April in Australia, and 27 April in North America.

To complement Mario Kart Wii's unique motion controls, a plastic, wheel-shaped casing for the Wii Remote was included with some versions of the game. The designers tested roughly 30 different prototypes of the wheel with different shapes, colors, and weights based on real-life go-karts. The final design for the wheel was made to be as lightweight as possible for it to suit long-term periods of gameplay, and it was made entirely white despite experimentation with two-colored designs for it to fit with the color scheme of previous peripherals such as the Wii Zapper and the Wii Balance Board. A blue ring with the Wii logo inside of it was also placed on the backside of the wheel to give spectating players something interesting to look at; as a result, this blue ring ended up being featured in the game's logo.

The game's music was composed by Asuka Hayazaki and Ryō Nagamatsu, who both used new interpretations of the familiar melodies from earlier games alongside original material. The speaker on the Wii Remote is frequently used during gameplay, with sound effects being emitted from it. During the extensive testing of the different Wii Wheel prototypes, the developers decided to have the voice actors play the game during recording sessions.

== Reception ==
Reception

Aggregate score
Aggregator	Score
Metacritic	82/100

Review scores
Publication	Score
Edge	6/10
Electronic Gaming Monthly	B+/C+/C
Eurogamer	8/10
Famitsu	37/40
Game Informer	8.5/10
GamePro	4.75/5
GameSpot	8.5/10
GameSpy	4.5/5
GameTrailers	8.4/10
GameZone	8.8/10
Giant Bomb	3/5
IGN	8.5/10
Nintendo Life	9/10
Nintendo World Report	7.5/10
Official Nintendo Magazine	94%

Mario Kart Wii received "generally favorable" reviews according to review aggregator website Metacritic. Reviewers deemed the gameplay to be familiar and more safe and predictable than that of Mario Kart: Double Dash. Tae K. Kim of GamePro admired the variety of the character roster, though Bryn Williams of GameSpy felt that some of the unlockable characters were bland. Although Shane Bettenhausen of Electronic Gaming Monthly and Ryan Davis of Giant Bomb acknowledged that some of the new tracks were inventive, they and Williams determined the track roster to be weaker and less creative than in previous entries. Lark Anderson of GameSpot praised the game for being easy to jump into for players of any skill level and stated that motorcycles provide a great alternative to go-karts. The additions of motorcycles and an online multiplayer mode were welcomed. The unbalanced items and rubberband AI, which were said to result in chance-influenced gameplay, were a common point of criticism, as was the truncation of the battle mode from previous titles.

Kim was unimpressed by the graphics, and observed that their quality lowered in the split-screen multiplayer mode. Williams described the game as a "480p widescreen treat, delivering crisp, colorful graphics". Greg Nicksarlian of GameZone complimented the visuals as sharp and vibrant, but acknowledged their simplicity. Mark Bozon of IGN summarized the visuals as basic but charming and polished. The music was generally considered to be unremarkable, and the voice acting was derided as repetitive and annoying.

In 2010, Mario Kart Wii was included in the book 1001 Video Games You Must Play Before You Die. Anthony John Agnello and David Roberts of GamesRadar+ ranked Mario Kart Wii #11 in their 2017 list of best Mario Kart games, the second-lowest ranking behind the cancelled Virtual Boy Mario Kart. They described the game as "a bloated, populist mess attempting to please everyone" that "feels like the most Mario Kart rather than the best Mario Kart, and as a result, it's as if it's missing the series' soul". The staff of IGN ranked the game #18 in their 2019 list of "Top 25 Favourite Kart Racers", deeming it "yet another solid entry in the series" and saying that its expanded track roster and inclusion of both online and splitscreen multiplayer gameplay made it "one of the system’s go-to party games". Luke Plunkett of Kotaku ranked the game at #7 out of the nine best Mario Kart games; he felt that there was little reason to play the game after the improvements made by Mario Kart 7 and 8, and that the motion controls were "straight garbage". The tracks Maple Treeway and Coconut Mall have been ranked among the series' best, while Matthew Wilkinson of Screen Rant respectively ranked Rainbow Road, Wario's Gold Mine, and Moonview Highway as the first, eighth and ninth most difficult tracks in the series.

=== Sales ===
Mario Kart Wii had a successful launch and sold 300,000 copies on the launch day in Japan alone, compared to Mario Kart DS which sold 160,000 copies on its first day and Mario Kart: Double Dash which sold 180,000 on its first day. In the week ending May 4, 2008, Mario Kart Wii had sold over a million copies in Japan alone, less than a month since its release in the region. In the UK, Mario Kart Wii was the best-selling video game in the week ending April 12, 2008, having "the eighth biggest opening sales week in UK software history," according to GfK Chart-Track/ELSPA. The game dwarfed all other five Mario Wii games released up until then for the Wii combined when comparing first-week sales. In the United States, Mario Kart Wii was the second-best-selling video game in April 2008, selling 1.12 million copies, according to the NPD Group; putting it behind the Xbox 360 version of Grand Theft Auto IV and ahead of the PlayStation 3 version, both released in the same week. It ranked the fourth-best-selling game of December 2008 in the United States, selling more than 979,000 copies. According to the NPD Group, GfK Chart-Track, and Enterbrain, the game has sold 2.409 million copies in the United States, 687,000 in the United Kingdom, and 1.601 million in Japan, respectively, for a total of 4.697 million copies sold by August 1, 2008. As of March 2009, Nintendo has sold 15.4 million copies of Mario Kart Wii worldwide. As of January 4, 2009, it has sold 2,133,000 copies in Japan. It is also the fourth-best-selling game of Japan in 2008. According to the NPD Group, GfK Chart-Track, and Enterbrain, the game has sold 856,000 copies in the United States, 394,000 in the United Kingdom, and 218,000 in Japan, respectively, for a total of 1.468 million copies sold in the third quarter of 2008 (July–September). It was the second-best-selling game of 2008 in the United States, selling more than five million copies. Overall, the game sold 8.94 million units worldwide in 2008, making it the best-selling game of the year. In France, it sold 4.8 million units, which is more than it sold in Japan (3.7 million). With 37.38 million copies sold worldwide as of March 31, 2021, the game is the best-selling Mario game for the Wii, the second-best-selling racing game, and the second-best-selling game for the Wii behind Wii Sports.

=== Awards ===
The game won multiple Wii-specific awards from IGN in its 2008 video game awards, including Best Racing Game and Best Online Multiplayer Game. IGN also nominated it for Best Family Game for the Wii. During the 12th Annual Interactive Achievement Awards, the Academy of Interactive Arts & Sciences nominated Mario Kart Wii for "Racing Game of the Year". Guinness World Records has awarded Mario Kart Wii with a record for being the best-selling racing video game of all time, though Mario Kart 8 Deluxe has since outsold it.

== Legacy ==
While official online play support ended in 2014, unofficial video game mods created by fans have re-established online play. CTGP Revolution is a ROM hack which adds additional courses and new features, such as 24-player races, an implementation of the 200cc engine class from Mario Kart 8 (2014), and additional modes. In 2026, Mario Kart Wiicompiled, a static recompilation of the game by Patchzy, was released in beta. It contains several features, such as higher framerates, higher resolution support, and integration with the ROM hack Retro Rewind.
