= Nefarious (video game) =

2017 video game

- Developer: StarBlade
- Publishers: Starblade (Windows, OS X, Linux); Digerati (PlayStation 4, Switch, Xbox One)
- Director: Josh Hano
- Programmer: Phillip Spear
- Artists: Josh Hano; Andrew Dickman
- Composers: Matthew Taranto; Double Cleff; David Levy
- Engine: Unity
- Platforms: PlayStation 4, Microsoft Windows, OS X, Linux, Nintendo Switch, Xbox One
- Release: Microsoft Windows, OS X, Linux: WW: January 23, 2017; PlayStation 4: WW: September 11, 2018; Xbox One: WW: September 13, 2018; Nintendo Switch: WW: October 4, 2018
- Genres: Action, platformer

Nefarious is an action platform game developed by StarBlade. Players control Crow, a supervillain who captures princesses to power his doomsday device. The game subverts typical video game boss fights by allowing the player to take the role of the boss against archetypical hero characters.

The game was funded through a Kickstarter campaign, raising over $50,000, and was released on Steam for Linux, Microsoft Windows and OS X on January 23, 2017. Ports for Nintendo Switch, PlayStation 4 and Xbox One were released in 2018. The game received mixed reviews from critics and has spawned a sequel webcomic series.

== Gameplay ==
Gameplay in Nefarious takes place on a two-dimensional plane; players are able to move from left to right and jump to progress through levels. Crow is able to perform a close-range melee attack and a grenade throw to attack distant enemies; these attacks can be manually aimed independently of Crow's movement. Grenades can also be used to "grenade jump", using their blast to propel Crow higher or across longer distances. Each level contains in-game currency known as Lucre for players to obtain, along with three collectible crowns and a vinyl record, which will unlock music at the in-game jukebox. If Crow's health is depleted, the player will lose some of their accrued Lucre and be forced to restart from the last checkpoint; this Lucre can be regained from a small flying robot that appears around the area where the player died.

Unlike most other platformers, the player controls the boss and must defeat the heroes in boss fights, many of which take inspiration from classic video game series like Sonic the Hedgehog and Super Mario. The game also features unique gameplay segments, such as a role-playing game boss battle inspired by the Final Fantasy series and a dating sim level. At the end of each level, players receive a letter grade based on their performance. After each level, players will return to Crow's airship, the Sovereign, which acts as a central hub. From there, players can select a level to play from the world map, interact with non-player characters aboard the ship, listen to music at the jukebox, and spend their accrued Lucre to buy upgrades for Crow; these include health meter extensions, additional grenade ammunition, and equippable modifications that add special properties to Crow's attacks. Some levels are hidden and can only be unlocked by achieving specific requirements. Players must complete these levels to get the game's true ending.

== Plot ==
Crow is a supervillain who frequently kidnaps Princess Mayapple of Macro City, developing an unusual friendship with her as a result, only to be constantly foiled by his archnemesis and Mayapple's boyfriend, Mack. During Crow's latest kidnapping attempt, Mack breaks up with Mayapple, tired of her spending more time with Crow than with him due to the kidnappings, and leaves. Taking advantage of the opportunity, Crow imprisons Mayapple on his airship, the Sovereign. He makes plans with his majordomo Becky to travel to the neighboring kingdoms and kidnap four more princesses, as they emit a powerful energy which he needs to power his doomsday weapon, the Doom Howitzer.

Crow travels to the insect kingdom of Insektia and kidnaps Princess Apoidea. Next, he abducts Princess Ariella of the dwarf kingdom of Winterdown, which is at war with the ogre kingdom of Sukechi. Crow also attempts to kidnap Princess Tephra of Sukechi, but as she is too strong, he takes her brother Prince Malachite instead. During his travels, Crow runs afoul of not only the kingdoms' local heroes, but also their villains, who feel he is encroaching on their territory. As he spends time with each of them, Crow and the princesses start to become friends, teaming up on missions to achieve each of the princesses' personal goals.

Infiltrating an Adept Co. laboratory in Macro City, Crow learns that Mayapple commissioned the villain Dr. Cackle to create an artificial princess made of energy to be her successor. After several failed attempts, she experienced a crisis of conscience and ordered the project shut down, though Cackle continued development in secret. Crow retrieves the project's final result, Princess Farrah Day, along with the earlier imperfect specimens. Mayapple, still feeling guilty, asks Crow to help her infiltrate Cackle's lab and stop him from creating more Farrah Days for global conquest. Mayapple defeats Cackle, threatening to kill him, and Crow can choose whether or not to stop her.

As Crow returns to his home base in Bramble Flats to finish his plan, the Sovereign is attacked and destroyed by Tephra, who seeks the Doom Howitzer for herself and has united the other kingdoms' armies under her rule. Crow escapes and fights his way through the heroes to reach the Doom Howitzer, with Becky having already placed the princesses inside. The princesses attempt to dissuade Crow, but he activates the machine, using it to kill Mack when he arrives to stop him. In the aftermath, the other kingdoms all fall to the Doom Howitzer and Crow's empire spreads across the world. The princesses curse Crow for his betrayal, though Mayapple escapes confinement and makes plans to rescue the others on her own.

In the game's true ending, if Mayapple did not kill Cackle, Crow can choose to abandon the plan at the last moment out of friendship with the princesses. Disgusted by his lack of ambition, Becky takes control of the Doom Howitzer, forcing Mayapple to stop her with help from Crow and the princesses. The Doom Howitzer is destroyed, and Crow and Becky are assumed lost in the explosion. In the aftermath, the princesses return to their kingdoms; Malachite and Ariella dethrone Tephra and end their people's war; and Mayapple rejects Mack's attempts to get back together. Crow and Becky are shown to have survived, and the two reconcile, promising to come up with a new plan to rule the world.

== Reception ==
Reception

Aggregate score
| Aggregator | Score |
|---|---|
| Metacritic | NS: 65/100; PC: 67/100 |

Review scores
| Publication | Score |
|---|---|
| Destructoid | 5.5/10 |
| Hardcore Gamer | 4/5 |
| Nintendo World Report | 8/10 |

Nefarious received mixed reviews from critics. On review aggregator Metacritic, Nefarious received a score of 65/100 for the Nintendo Switch release and 67/100 for the PC release.

Kyle LeClair of Hardcore Gamer praised the game's characters, graphics, and sense of humor. Xander Morningstar of Nintendo World Report similarly felt the game's style and presentation were its best aspects, believing the gameplay was too simple at times and wishing certain mechanics were further fleshed out. While Nic Rowen of Destructoid also lauded the narrative and environments, he felt that the gameplay did not live up to its premise, calling it "a sloppy game that feels in many respects half-done".

== Legacy ==
In January 2018, game director Josh Hano began releasing a continuation of the Nefarious story in the form of an ongoing webcomic. The series is funded via Patreon and distributed via an official website and Webtoon, with the first six issues also available as a graphic novel. Set after the game's true ending, the comic sees Crow reconnect with his siblings and contend with other villains, including his father Buzzard, while Mack and Mayapple must navigate the complex political landscape of heroics and villainy. Crow also appears as the final boss of the 2018 crossover fighting game Indie Pogo, along with a stage based on the Sovereign.
