= Hideki Konno =

Japanese video game director, designer, and producer

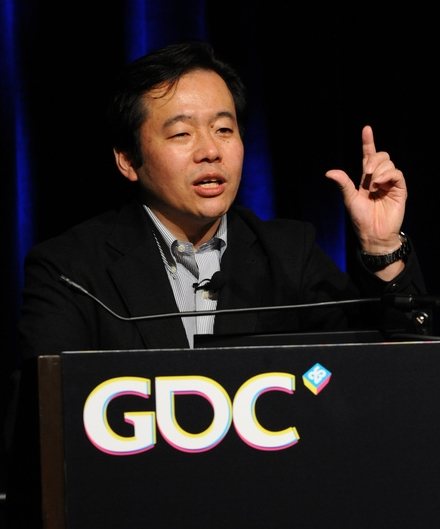
- Konno at the GDC 2011
- Born: May 13, 1965 (age 61); Chiba, Chiba, Japan
- Education: Japan Electronics College
- Occupations: video game designer, director and producer
- Employer: Nintendo (1986–2025)
- Known for: Super Mario series Mario Kart series Luigi's Mansion; Nintendogs; Yoshi's Island
- Title: Manager at Nintendo EAD Group No. 1. (2003–2015); Manager at Nintendo EPD Smart Device Group (2015–2025)

Hideki Konno (紺野 秀樹, Konno Hideki) (Note: He has sometimes been mistakenly credited as Hidequi Konno.) (born May 13, 1965) is a video game director, game designer and producer who worked for Nintendo for nearly 40 years.

== Biography ==
Konno joined Nintendo in 1986, where he worked on positions such as assistant director in the beginning of his career, along with being the director for games such as Super Mario Kart and Super Mario World 2: Yoshi's Island.

Around the beginning of the 2000s, he became the group manager of his own department at Nintendo EAD, where he produced games such as Nintendogs, Mario Kart DS and Mario Kart Wii. Konno also went on to become the producer for the Nintendo DS's successor, the Nintendo 3DS. After this, he produced the games Nintendogs + Cats, Mario Kart 7 and Mario Kart 8 for Nintendo EAD.

In 2015, Konno began managing Nintendo's mobile projects on his own production group at Nintendo Entertainment Planning & Development, the division resulting from the merger of Nintendo's main development and production divisions.

In July 2025, Konno officially left Nintendo after working in the company for nearly 40 years.

== Works ==
Year	Game title	Role
1987	Yume Kōjō: Doki Doki Panic	Assistant director, level design
1988	Super Mario Bros. 2	Assistant director, level design
1988	Ice Hockey	Director
1988	Super Mario Bros. 3	Assistant director, level design
1990	Super Mario World	Map director, level design
1991	SimCity	Director
1992	Super Mario Kart	Director
1995	Yoshi's Island	Director
1996	Mario Kart 64	Director
1997	Yoshi's Story	System director
1998	F-Zero X	Sequence support
2001	Mario Kart: Super Circuit	Supervisor
2001	Luigi's Mansion	Director
2002	The Legend of Zelda: The Wind Waker	Supervisor
2005	Geist	Producer
2005	Nintendogs	Producer
2005	Mario Kart DS	Producer
2008	Mario Kart Wii	Producer
2011	Nintendogs + Cats	Producer
2011	Nintendo 3DS	Producer
2011	Mario Kart 7	Producer
2013	Luigi's Mansion: Dark Moon	Special advisor
2014	Mario Kart 8	Producer
2016	Super Mario Run	Producer
2017	Fire Emblem Heroes	Producer
2017	Mario Kart 8 Deluxe	Producer
2017	Animal Crossing: Pocket Camp	Producer
2018	Dragalia Lost	Producer
2019	Dr. Mario World	Producer
2019	Mario Kart Tour	Producer
2023	Mario Kart 8 Deluxe - Booster Course Pass	Producer

== Interviews ==
- Iwata Asks: Mario Kart Wii - Development Staff Interview..
