= Nintendogs + Cats =

2011 video game

- North American box art for Toy Poodle & New Friends
- Developer: Nintendo EAD
- Publisher: Nintendo
- Director: Yasuyuki Oyagi
- Producer: Hideki Konno
- Designer: Daisuke Kageyama
- Composer: Asuka Hayazaki
- Platform: Nintendo 3DS
- Release: JP: February 26, 2011; EU: March 25, 2011; NA: March 27, 2011
- Genre: Pet-raising simulation
- Mode: Single-player

Nintendogs + Cats (Note: Japanese: ニンテンドッグス＋キャッツ, Hepburn: Nintendoggusu + Kyattsu) is a 2011 pet simulation video game developed and published by Nintendo for the Nintendo 3DS. It is a sequel to the Nintendogs games for the Nintendo DS. It was released as a launch title for the system on February 26, 2011, in Japan, March 25, 2011, in Europe and March 27, 2011, in North America.

It is one of the first online-enabled games to use the Nintendo Network and is the first such Nintendo-published game, although the Nintendo Network brand itself was not revealed until early 2012. All three editions of the game were re-released on the Nintendo eShop on January 30, 2013, in Japan, December 19, 2013, in Europe and November 6, 2014, in North America.

== Gameplay ==
Much of the gameplay is common to the original Nintendogs, including various breeds of dogs and cats, and training exercises. There is now a tutorial for each trick as the game progresses, and the player is no longer required to say the exact name of the trick. Touchscreen, microphone, and camera input uses facial recognition technology to interact with the player. For example, after a while, the pet will facially recognize and greet the player, and may react negatively to a new player. If the face is close to the camera, then the puppy will come up to lick it; they will also mimic a head tilt.

Competitions have five cups each: Junior, Amateur, Pro, Master, and Nintendogs. In addition to Disc Competition and Obedience Trial, there a new competition, Lure Coursing.

The screen is in stereoscopic 3D. Augmented reality projects the player's dog or cat onto one of the "?" AR Games cards. If one of the Nintendo character cards (such as Mario, Link, Samus, or Kirby) is used, the dogs will appear wearing hats, fitting the theme of their respective games. These hats are also in the 3DS built-in app, StreetPass Mii Plaza by unlocking them when a dog or cat hero defeats an enemy depending on the room they are in during the game "Find Mii". The game uses SpotPass and often a Presidential Victor will appear, which is a President with the pet dog.

== Versions ==
The game comes in three different versions: Nintendogs + Cats: French Bulldog & New Friends, Nintendogs + Cats: Golden Retriever & New Friends, and Nintendogs + Cats: Toy Poodle & New Friends. Each version features many breeds. In Japan, the Golden Retriever version is called Shiba Inu & New Friends.

Each version begins with nine dog breeds, but all twenty seven are unlockable in each game. All the breeds from the original Nintendogs games return plus eight new breeds including: French Bulldog, Basset Hound, Great Dane, and Pomeranian. Three cat varieties appear in each version of the game, however there are no distinct breeds.

== Development ==
Designer Shigeru Miyamoto stated that the idea of dogs and cats getting along came from his own pets. This made him think of the Disney movie The Incredible Journey and its 1993 remake, Homeward Bound: The Incredible Journey. He stated that "Making a game called Nintencats just didn't seem right for Nintendo", so he brought cats into Nintendogs. The game was announced alongside the 3DS during Nintendo's E3 press conference.

== Reception ==
Reception

Aggregate scores
Aggregator	Score
GameRankings	74.14%
Metacritic	71/100

Review scores
Publication	Score
Eurogamer	7/10
Famitsu	38/40
Game Informer	6.5/10
GameSpot	7.5/10
GamesRadar+	3.5/5
IGN	7/10
Official Nintendo Magazine	84%

Nintendogs + Cats received mixed reviews by critics, having an aggregate score of 74.14% on GameRankings and 71/100 on Metacritic. Japanese magazine Famitsu gave the game a 38/40, the highest score of all Nintendo 3DS launch titles.

Two months after the first launch, Nintendo announced sales of 1.71 million units, making it officially the first platinum game for the 3DS. As of December 31, 2015, the game has worldwide sales of 3.99 million.
