= Waluigi Pinball =

Fictional race track in Mario Kart

- Mario Kart location
- Waluigi Pinball as shown in Mario Kart DS
- First appearance: Mario Kart DS (2005)
- Last appearance: Mario Kart 8 Deluxe – Booster Course Pass (2022)
- Created by: Nintendo EAD
- Genre: Kart racing

In-universe information
- Type: Kart circuit / pinball machine
- Location: Mushroom Kingdom

Waluigi Pinball (Note: Japanese: ワルイージピンボール, Hepburn: Waruīji Pinbōru) is a race track that made its first appearance in the 2005 video game Mario Kart DS, an entry in the Mario Kart series of kart racing games. The course takes place inside a giant pinball machine themed after the character Waluigi. It has reappeared, without much change, in later iterations of the series.

The track has received praise from critics, ranking high in all-time rankings of courses in the series. It has also been noted for its characterization of Waluigi and the execution of its concept.

== Description ==
The mini-map of the course as shown in Mario Kart DS

Waluigi Pinball is a race track that is set entirely inside of a large pinball machine decorated with neon lights. A psychedelic backdrop similar to that of Rainbow Road is featured outside of the machine. The start of the course has the player launched out of a chute on the side of the machine, landing at the top of the board. They then zigzag down the track until reaching the main surface of the pinball table, which includes large bumpers. Other obstacles throughout include large paddles and metal balls, which roll down the middle of the track from the top and also crisscross in the player's path in the lower part of the course. The bumpers and paddles have a chance to either give the player a speed boost or temporarily stun them.

== Appearances ==
Waluigi Pinball made its debut in the 2005 installment Mario Kart DS as a part of the Flower Cup, which contained three other tracks. A court based off the track appeared in the 2010 game Mario Sports Mix. It subsequently appeared in 2011's Mario Kart 7, in the Banana Cup.

In October 2019, the track was added to Mario Kart Tour in the "Halloween Tour" event. It accompanied the addition of Waluigi as a playable character. After being absent in the base game of Mario Kart 8 Deluxe, the course was added to the game in August 2022 through the second wave of the Booster Course Pass DLC. Its appearance in Mario Kart Tour and Mario Kart 8 was kept very similar to that of its original appearance in Mario Kart DS, with its main updates between games being polished visuals. In 2024, the course made an appearance as a minigame in Super Mario Party Jamboree, in which players try to reach the highest score playing pinball against NPCs.

== Reception ==
Waluigi Pinball was praised by critics. On the track's release in the Mario Kart 8 DLC, Tom Philips of Eurogamer called it "one of the most adored Mario Kart tracks of all time" and Engadget's Kris Holt dubbed it a "fan-favorite". Kelsey Raynor of VG247 praised the course for its characterization of Waluigi, with its sharp turns, neon lights, and obnoxious noises. Writing for Destructoid, Peter Glagowski called it the best track in the series, noting its high-quality design and how "catchy" the track was.

The course has ranked high in all-time rankings of Mario Kart courses. It was placed third on the 2017 "The 50 Greatest Mario Kart Courses, Ranked" list by Thrillist's Joshua Khan. Waluigi Pinball made Digital Spy's and Prima Games' top ten list of tracks in 2014, with its concept of players making their way down a pinball machine being praised for the former and the latter commenting on the course's appearance and tight turns. It was placed fourth out of fifteen by The A.V. Club in 2017 and in 2021, GamingBolt placed it third on their "15 Best Tracks of All Time" ranking, noting its creativity and sound design. It was also placed on Pocket Tactics' 2025 unranked list of the "The 14 best Mario Kart tracks of all time", where it was praised for how it well conveyed Waluigi's personality.

== Speedrunning ==
In April 2024, a large shortcut in the DS version of the course was found, in which the player can save time in the middle of the course by jumping onto a guardrail from a ramp. The strategy was already known by tool-assisted speedrun users, but it was only in 2024 when it was discovered that the shortcut was humanly possible. The discovery led to an increase in attention in speedrunning and time trials in the game and the world record being broken by six seconds within five days.
