= Brawl in the Family (webcomic) =

Gag-a-day webcomic by Matthew Taranto

- Author: Matthew Taranto
- Website: bitf.matthewtaranto.com
- Launch date: May 1, 2008
- End date: October 2, 2014
- Genre: Comedy

Brawl in the Family is a gag-a-day webcomic written and drawn by Matthew Taranto that ran for 600 comics released between May 1, 2008 and October 3, 2014. The webcomic was inspired by the Super Smash Bros. series and features characters from various video game franchises, predominantly those seen on Nintendo video game consoles such as Kirby, Super Mario, Pokémon, F-Zero, and Metroid.

== Setting and cast ==
Brawl in the Family is a play on words - a portmanteau of All in the Family and the Nintendo game Super Smash Bros. Brawl. The comic featured a variety of playable characters from the Super Smash Bros. series, with Kirby as its protagonist. Other characters playing a large role include King Dedede, Meta Knight, Captain Falcon and Jigglypuff, along with fellow Kirby characters Adeleine and Waddle Dee. Brawl in the Family primarily consisted of short visual jokes and wordplay, but also featured longer storylines and music videos, often to mark special occasions. Later in the series, the webcomic began to feature characters that were announced to be playable in Super Smash Bros. for Nintendo 3DS and Wii U.

The webcomic later introduced a few original characters, such as Eario, the unseen janitor of Mushroom Kingdom, tasked with cleaning up in Mario's wake. Brawl in the Family expanded upon existing Super Smash Bros. characters by creating romances between Kirby and Jigglypuff, as well as Samus Aran and Captain Falcon, and by turning originally minor characters into recurring characters, such as Waluigi and a Bug Catcher from the Pokémon series.

== Notable comics ==
A small portion of one of the "Kirby eats something" strips

Brawl in the Family started under the title of Kirby Comics and was only uploaded on websites such as GameFAQs and IGN forums, until Taranto decided to expand the webcomic's cast and publish it on his own website, which was designed by Chris Seward. The first strip on the website is "The Showdown", published on June 13, 2008, showing a visual gag of Kirby transforming into his nemesis/best friend King Dedede. The character Waluigi was introduced in the April Fool's Day 2009 strip as a joke character, becoming a recurring and popular character with readers.

Musical comics were introduced with the 115th comic, How the King Stole Christmas Part 2, featuring the song "You're a Mean King", which parodied "You're a Mean One, Mr. Grinch". The 400th Brawl in the Family strip is a music video titled "The History of Nintendo", which covers the US releases of many Nintendo games throughout the company's history. Nintendo Life stated that the video "crams some good detail into its 3:42 running time" and described it as "catchy." Taranto himself called it his personal favorite Brawl in the Family video. "The History of Nintendo" was released shortly after Taranto underwent major surgery and was temporarily unable to work on more strips.

In response to Mega Man being revealed as a playable character in Super Smash Bros. for Nintendo 3DS and Wii U and as the webcomic's 500th strip, Taranto uploaded a short video titled "Prodigal Robot" as a tribute to the iconic game character, while poking fun at the "popularity curve" of the Mega Man franchise.

=== Nintendo Force ===
Lucas Thomas of IGN contacted Taranto to be one of the comic artists of Nintendo Force, a fan magazine. After Brawl in the Family ended, Taranto continued working on Nintendo-themed comics for the magazine.

=== Ending ===
Taranto announced the end of the webcomic on July 25, 2014, in his 580th strip titled "World Eight-Four". Taranto later confirmed his final strip to be released on 3 October, precisely on the date Super Smash Bros. for Nintendo 3DS was going to be released. Though this was purely coincidental, Taranto described it as "very fitting", as the webcomic started around the time Super Smash Bros. Brawl was released. In an interview with WiiU Daily, Taranto detailed his reasons to stop with his webcomic: "[I] feel like I've pushed it about as far as it can go by this point. It's gotten more difficult to come up with unique concepts for strips that I haven't already covered at some point, and I'm ready to dive into projects that involve non-existing IPs."

The final comic, "One Final Song", was described as "a very nostalgic musical number, drawing together tracks from [the webcomic's] long and musical history" and was dedicated to "all of the individuals that have enjoyed his work over the years." Armed Gamer stated that the song "really hits in the feels" and praised the five "Meet Me at Final Destination" comics that led up to it.

=== BitMusical ===
In 2023, Taranto announced BitMusical, a spinoff of the comic focusing on original animated songs about video games, similar to the musical comics featured in Brawl in the Family. The series premiered on the same day, with the videos "Ode to Minions" (an animated remake of comic #200) and "One-Note Song".

On October 25, 2024, Taranto announced on his Patreon page that BitMusical would be ending in December of that year, citing the large amount of work required to make the videos, and that he wanted to "[...] disengage a bit with the internet in a broader sense". He also announced his intention to release a new Kickstarter campaign, as well as "at least two other projects currently in the planning stages for me to tackle in 2025". The final entry in the series is a revised version of "The History of Nintendo" including new material that Nintendo had released in the 12 years following the original version.

== Kickstarter campaigns ==
Taranto's first Kickstarter campaign was to fund Brawl in the Family: Volume 1, a comic book treasury containing the webcomic's first 200 strips, as well as bonus content. The campaign reached its initial goal of $10,000 within the first 24 hours and raised more than $56,000 in total.

Around the time of the webcomic's end, Taranto started a Kickstarter campaign to fund the release of two more hardcover and paperback comic book treasuries containing the remaining 400 comics, as well as a large amount of bonuses. Each book contains a total of 200 strips, covering 244 pages. Available Kickstarter rewards included, but were not limited to, paperback and hardcover versions of all 3 books, a slipcase and signatures. Though the campaign hit its goal, the two new books were almost exclusively given to Kickstarter backers.

Taranto also composed the soundtrack and contributed to the Kickstarter campaign for Nefarious. Josh Hano, the creator of Nefarious, drew a crossover comic for Brawl in the Family which featured the game's protagonist, Crow. Hano also worked on the art and animations of Tadpole Treble.

=== Tadpole Treble ===
In November 2013, Matthew Taranto and his brother Michael started a Kickstarter campaign for Tadpole Treble, a music video game featuring a tadpole named Baton. In this game, the music determines the layout of the level. There was a demo of Tadpole Treble available during the Kickstarter campaign. The game was successfully funded on December 7, 2013, and was released for Steam on May 6, 2016 and for Wii U on August 11 of the same year. An enhanced version of the game titled Tadpole Treble Encore was announced for Nintendo Switch, and was released on January 21, 2021.

=== Too Bad. Waluigi Time ===
On March 31, 2018, Taranto launched a Kickstarter for Too Bad. Waluigi Time, a comic book treasury featuring all of Waluigi's previous appearances in the webcomic, along with 200 new strips focusing on the character and 30 additional Brawl in the Family comics, called Back in the Family. The book reached its $25,000 goal in three days, ultimately raising over $90,000 by the time of the campaign's conclusion. The book was released physically and digitally on April 1, 2020.

=== Gamemaster Classified ===
On February 9, 2021, Taranto launched another Kickstarter for a hardcover book co-written by Howard Phillips, which is about lawsuits, reviews, comics and more relating to Nintendo and Phillips. It achieved its $23,000 goal within the first seven hours of being posted to Kickstarter.

=== Mega Man: Bot in the Family ===
On June 19, 2026, Taranto announced a Kickstarter campaign for Mega Man: Bot in the Family, a hardcover collection of comic strips based on the Mega Man franchise. Unlike the Brawl in the Family comic, which is a fan work, Mega Man: Bot in the Family is officially licensed by Capcom. The project's $19,870 goal was reached within 30 minutes of its launch.

== Podcast ==
Taranto and website designer Chris Seward launched the Brawl in the Family Podcast in February 2013. The podcast is mainly based around the discussion of video games, and continued even following the end of the comic. No new podcasts have been released since 2018.

== Reception ==
On the day of the final comic's release, gaming website Retro praised the comic, saying, "There are lots of comics out there joking about classic games, but a few things set Brawl in the Family apart. While a lot of comedic webcomics tend to veer into cynical territory, Brawl in the Family is almost aggressively lighthearted. It feels like it's simply inviting audiences to marvel at the absurdity of these assorted game worlds and their nuances. There were a few instances where Taranto actually apologized or warned readers for content that most wouldn't find objectionable at all. Given the source material, a warm, family-friendly tone feels appropriate. This isn't to say that there's anything inherently wrong with edgier content or black comedy, but it's refreshing to have a cheerful comic out there that still manages to be clever and funny."
