= Nintendogs =

2005 video game

- Dalmatian and Friends European box art
- Developer: Nintendo EAD
- Publisher: Nintendo
- Director: Kiyoshi Mizuki
- Producer: Hideki Konno
- Designer: Junji Morii
- Writer: Kunio Watanabe
- Composer: Hajime Wakai
- Platform: Nintendo DS
- Release: April 21, 2005: Original version; JP: April 21, 2005; NA: August 22, 2005; AU: September 22, 2005; EU: October 7, 2005 Best Friends; NA: October 24, 2005 Dalmatian & Friends; EU: June 16, 2006; NA: October 16, 2006; AU: November 2, 2006
- Genre: Pet-raising simulation
- Modes: Single-player, multiplayer

Nintendogs (Note: Japanese: ニンテンドッグス, Hepburn: Nintendoggusu) (stylized in all lowercase) is a 2005 pet simulation video game developed and published by Nintendo for the Nintendo DS handheld video game console. It was released in Japan, and was later released in: North America, Australia, New Zealand, Europe and other regions. It was originally released in three different versions: Dachshund & Friends, Lab & Friends (Shiba & Friends in Japan) and Chihuahua & Friends. It has been re-released twice, first as a bundled release with a special edition Nintendo DS with a new version called Nintendogs: Best Friends which was released only in US and later Australia and subsequently with Nintendogs: Dalmatian & Friends.

Nintendogs uses the DS's touchscreen and built-in microphone. The touch screen allows the player to pet a dog, as well as to use various items that can be found or purchased. These range from balls and frisbees, to toys, to grooming supplies to keep the dogs happy. The microphone is used to call to the player's dog by speaking the name given to the dog in the beginning of the game as well as to teach the dog tricks such as "sit" or "roll over". Players can bring their dogs on walks and to the park if they so choose. They may interact with other players in multi-player by using the DS's wireless linkup. It also uses the DS's internal clock and calendar to allow the dog to grow hungrier or dirtier based on the elapsed time.

Nintendogs received positive reviews from critics and won many awards, including the 2006 Innovation Award from PC World and Best Handheld Game from the Associated Press. All versions of Nintendogs have sold a combined 23.96 million copies worldwide as of March 31, 2016, making it the second highest-selling game on the Nintendo DS, behind New Super Mario Bros. Because of Nintendogs' success, Nintendo has made several related products, including Nintendogs toys and a series of Nintendogs trading cards. A sequel, titled Nintendogs + Cats, was released for the Nintendo 3DS in 2011.

== Gameplay ==
In Nintendogs, players assume ownership of and interact with virtual dogs. Actions such as petting, playing, walking, and grooming are performed using the DS touchscreen. The game also utilizes the DS microphone which allows players to call or teach their dog tricks. Dogs remain as puppies and cannot age, die, or reproduce. Money can be earned by placing in competitions or selling items at the secondhand shop and can be used to purchase supplies, puppies and home decor. Dogs can be walked and can be taken to the park where they can practice disc catching skills for disc competitions and to the gymnasium to practice dog agility for agility trials. While walking, question mark icons on the map point out areas that may contain neighborhood dogs or presents, though presents can be found unmarked as well.

Only three dogs may be kept at the player's house at one time and up to five dogs can stay at the dog hotel, where dogs can be swapped, dropped off and picked up at any time. The player can also choose to part ways with a dog by donating a dog to the hotel.

As time passes without the dog being cared for, its condition will slowly deteriorate as it becomes more hungry and dirty. The condition of the player's dogs can be found by clicking its name. Hunger is listed as: "Full", "Normal", "Hungry", and "Famished". Thirst is listed as "Quenched", "Normal", "Thirsty", or "Parched". The condition of the dog's coat is listed as "Beautiful", "Clean", "Normal", "Dirty", or "Filthy".

Nintendogs features a variety of contests, which are the player's main method of earning money and trainer points. There are three contests; Disc Competition, Agility Trial, and Obedience Trial. In each of them, there are five classes: Beginner, Open, Expert, Master and Championship. Each contest is commented on by two men, named Ted Rumsworth and Archie Hubbs. If the player's dog places 3rd or higher in its class, the dog will proceed to the next class, where the contest increases in difficulty level. Prize money earned differs depending on which contest has been entered, what place is finished and the class the dog is in. If the player does not place in the top three, they will be dropped to the previous difficulty level.

Nintendogs allows users to communicate wirelessly to other Nintendogs users through Bark Mode. Before activating Wireless Mode, the player can choose to give the other user a present. When another user with Bark Mode activated is nearby, the player will have an opportunity to play with the other trainer's dog and if the user has recorded a voice message on their White Record, the other user will hear the voice message.

== Development ==
First publicly mentioned in 1997, Shigesato Itoi (designer of EarthBound), Tsunekazu Ishihara (designer of Pokémon) and Shigeru Miyamoto codeveloped a Nintendo 64 prototype of a pet creature breeding game called Cabbage. Its four-year development was fundamentally enabled by the real-time clock and mass writability introduced in the requisite 64DD peripheral "such that even if the power is cut, [the game] can still raise the creature" and with optionally purchasable enhancement data. A subset of creature maintenance functionality would be made portable on the Game Boy and could be synchronized back to the 64DD disk, via the Transfer Pak. It was expected for release in 1998 and then, in 2000, but all further development was distracted. In 2006, Miyamoto concluded: "It disappeared, didn't it ... However, the conversations and design techniques that popped up when we were making Cabbage are, of course, connected to Nintendogs and other things that we're doing now."

The project which ultimately became Nintendogs began as a technical demo on the GameCube long before it was considered for the DS. It was migrated to the DS when the handheld was still in development. Shigeru Miyamoto originally came up with the idea for the game when he and his family bought a dog, which inspired him to create the project. The game's producer, Hideki Konno, looking for a game to take full advantage of all of the Nintendo DS's features, decided on a dog simulation game. Nintendogs, originally known as Puppy Times, was designed to have fifteen different versions, one for each breed of dog. Satoru Iwata suggested this to convey the feel that the player was choosing a dog from a kennel. However, the debugging process for each version was deemed too time-consuming to be feasible. After going back and forth between several versions, they eventually settled on three, with six dogs each and the rest available after completing in-game goals.

== Merchandise ==
In late 2005, Nintendo of America released the first series of Nintendogs "6-Card Fun Paks". Three different pack designs (each based on the US-released designs of the DS game) contains an assortment of "Collectible cards, stickers & more!". Each pack randomly contains two of 18 different Breed cards, one of nine different Dog in Training tip cards, one of six different Miscellaneous cards, one of 18 different Pop-Up Cards, one of six sundry sheets of stickers, one of four temporary tattoos and one Sweepstakes card. Another series of these cards were released in early 2007 by Enterplay, LLC. These cards, officially licensed by Nintendo, were created by the same individuals who worked on the first series. As such, the cards greatly resemble the first series. Keeping the "6-Card Fun Pak" name, each package contains two of 20 different At the Kennel cards (which feature all eighteen breeds from the games, including the Dalmatian and Jack Russell Terrier), one of nine Dog in Training tip cards, one of four Miscellaneous cards, one of 20 Pop-Up Cards, one of six sheets of stickers, one of four temporary tattoos and one Sweepstakes card. The next series also features three sundry packages, this time with a Dalmatian, Beagle and Pug on the front of the package.

A line of Nintendogs plush toys were released in Japan, featuring the most popular breeds in each game. They are also available at the Nintendo World Store. Various Nintendogs T-shirts were also made available at the Nintendo World Store. In Europe and Australia, a series of plush toys with an electronic sensor were released, and when the owner shook the bone, the dog would walk and bark. Nintendo has also released a set of plushes through Earthwood Toys.

Nintendo also commissioned several specially designed Nintendo DS systems to tie in with the game's release, with one of them being a diamond-studded pink Nintendo DS designed by Peach NYC. This particular DS went up for auction in 2024, with bids easily exceeding $18,000.

== Reception ==
Nintendogs: Chihuahua & Friends

Aggregate scores
Aggregator	Score
GameRankings	85.27%
Metacritic	83/100

Review score
Publication	Score
Game Informer	8/10

The game was well received by critics, with an average score of 85% at Game Rankings. In the May 2005 edition of the Famitsu, Japan's most popular gaming magazine, Nintendogs received a perfect 40/40 score. Only four other games had attained this score at the time. It also received an 8.5 out of 10 in Nintendo Power. Game Informer gave Nintendogs an 8 out of 10, reflecting on the game's lack of an ending. Game Oracle gave it 85% and a recommendation saying that unlike most sims, it has a lot of depth.

=== Sales ===
In the first week of its release in Japan (April 18, 2005, to April 24, 2005), the three versions, Shiba & Friends, Miniature Dachshund & Friends and Chihuahua & Friends, sold 75,000, 49,000 and 44,000, respectively, totalling 168,000 units. This title game also boosted the Nintendo DS system sales by over 4.2 times the previous week to 95,000 units, up from 22,000. It was the 91st best-selling game in Japan in 2008, selling 142,591 copies combined, with cumulative Japanese sales of 1,850,984 combined by 2008.

In Europe, it was the top-selling Nintendo game of 2005 with 1.6 million copies sold that year. The game went on to sell 23.96 million copies worldwide, making it the second best-selling Nintendo DS game of all time. According to Nintendo, the majority of Nintendogs owners were female.

Nintendogs also had very successful launches in North America and Europe, with first week sales of over 250,000 and 160,000 respectively. Lab & Friends received a "Double Platinum" sales award from the Entertainment and Leisure Software Publishers Association (ELSPA), indicating sales of at least 600,000 copies in the United Kingdom. ELSPA also gave Dalmatian & Friends a "Platinum" award, for at least 300,000 sales in the United Kingdom. By August 2006, in the United States, Chihuahua & Friends had sold 570,000 copies and earned $17 million; Labrador & Friends had sold 620,000 copies and earned $19 million; and Dachshund & Friends had sold 730,000 copies and earned $22 million. During the period between January 2000 and August 2006, the games were respectively the 50th, 44th and 32nd highest-selling games launched for the Game Boy Advance, Nintendo DS or PlayStation Portable in the United States.

On March 23, 2006, at GDC 2006, Nintendo's president Satoru Iwata announced that international sales of Nintendogs sales had reached 6 million. By March 31, 2008, the game was the best-selling Nintendo DS game published by Nintendo. As of March 31, 2015, the combined sales of all versions has reached 23.96 million and it is now second on the Nintendo DS best-sellers list behind New Super Mario Bros.

=== Awards ===
In addition to recognitions from publications such as Entertainment Weekly, BusinessWeek and the Chicago Sun Times, Nintendogs also won a wide variety of awards.

- E3 2005 Game Critics Awards: Best Handheld Game.
- TheG33ks Bronze Award for best Nintendo DS game.
- Associated Press: "Best Game of 2005"
- 2005 Japan Media Arts Festival: Excellence Prize
- PC World: "2006 Innovation Award"
- D&AD: Yellow Pencils Award 2006
- PETA: Best Animal-Friendly Video Game 2006
- IGN: Editors' Choice Award
- IGN: Best use of touch screen for Nintendo DS
- GameSpot: Editors' Choice award
- AIAS 9th Annual Interactive Achievement Awards: Handheld Game of the Year, Outstanding Achievement in Gameplay Engineering (tied with Guitar Hero).

=== Legacy ===
In 2010, 1UP.com included Nintendogs in their list of five "Essential Newcomers" of the decade, describing it as one of "five revolutionary new games" of the past 10 years, for its impact on drawing "non-gamers to console and portable systems" and establishing the "new" Nintendo. Despite derision from many hardcore gamers, Nintendogs sold tens of millions, mostly among casual gamers and paved the way for the Nintendo DS's worldwide success. This gave rise to a non-game trend, previously limited to PCs, on consoles and portables. Nintendo followed it up with more casual games such as Brain Age, Wii Sports and Wii Fit, establishing Nintendo as the most successful developer and publisher of the decade.

== Sequel and later references ==
It was announced during Nintendo's 2010 E3 presentation that Shigeru Miyamoto was working on a new Nintendogs project, involving some new innovations. The game, titled Nintendogs + Cats was finished in 2011 for the Nintendo 3DS and was released as a launch title in all regions.

A microgame based on Nintendogs appears in the game WarioWare: Smooth Moves. A Nintendogs Labrador Retriever puppy also appears in Super Smash Bros. Brawl as an assist trophy; owing to the nonviolent nature of the Nintendogs game, rather than fighting actively, the dog "plays" in front of the screen, blocking view. A French bulldog appears in Super Smash Bros. for Nintendo 3DS and Wii U, taking the role of the Labrador Retriever, and the Nintendo 3DS version features a Nintendogs + Cats stage. Both the assist trophy, now represented by a Toy Poodle, and the stage reappear in Super Smash Bros. Ultimate. Multiple Nintendogs themed items are available as downloadable content in Animal Crossing: City Folk as well as its sequel, Animal Crossing: New Leaf, where they can be purchased with in-game currency.
